= Florin (New Zealand coin) =

Coin of the New Zealand pound from 1933 to 1965

- New Zealand
- Value: 2s (£NZ)
- Mass: 11.31 g
- Diameter: 28.60 mm
- Edge: Milled
- Composition: 1933–1946: 50% silver, 50% quaternary alloy 1947–1965: cupronickel (75% copper, 25% nickel)
- Years of minting: 1933-1965

Obverse
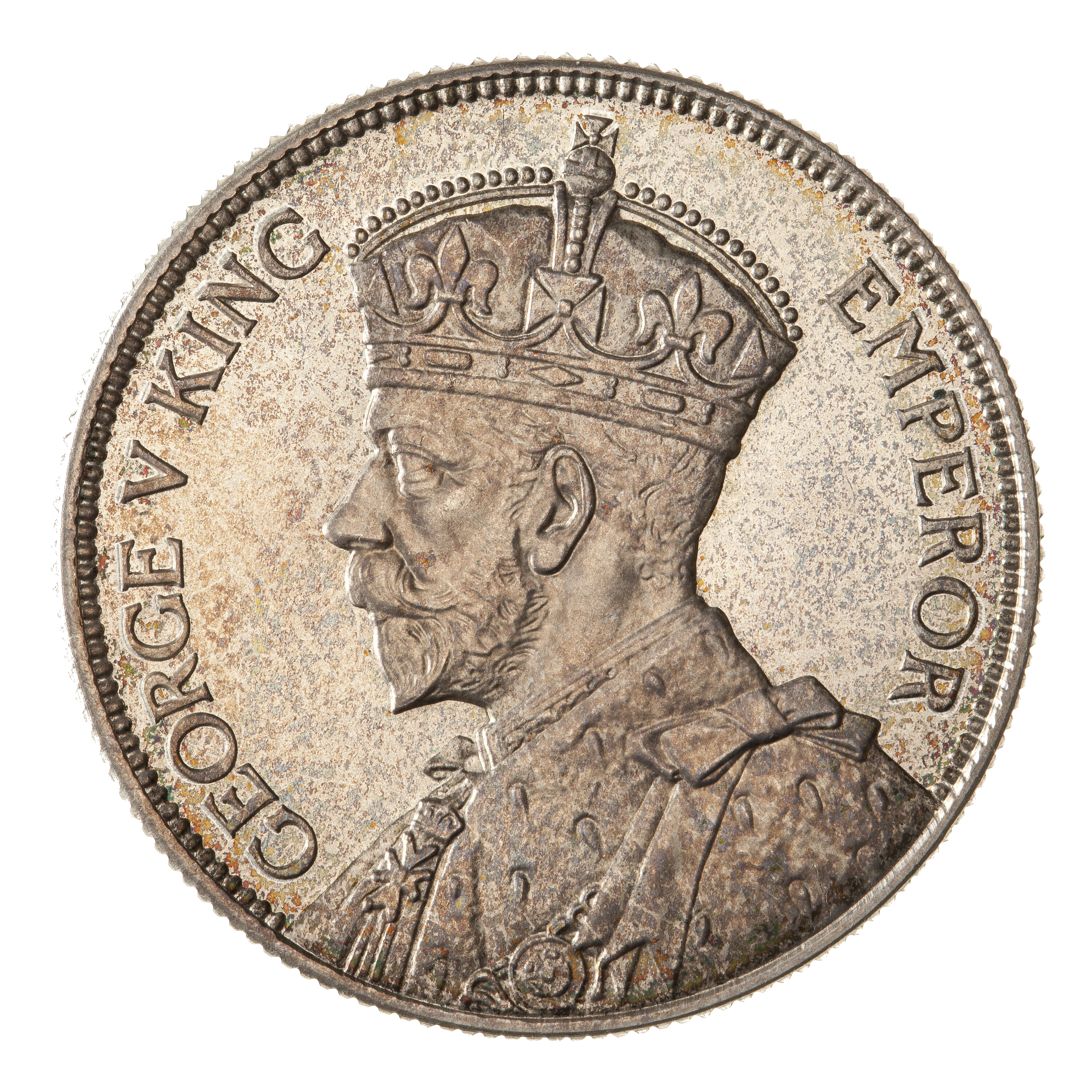
- Design: Crowned bust of George V
- Designer: Percy Metcalfe

Reverse
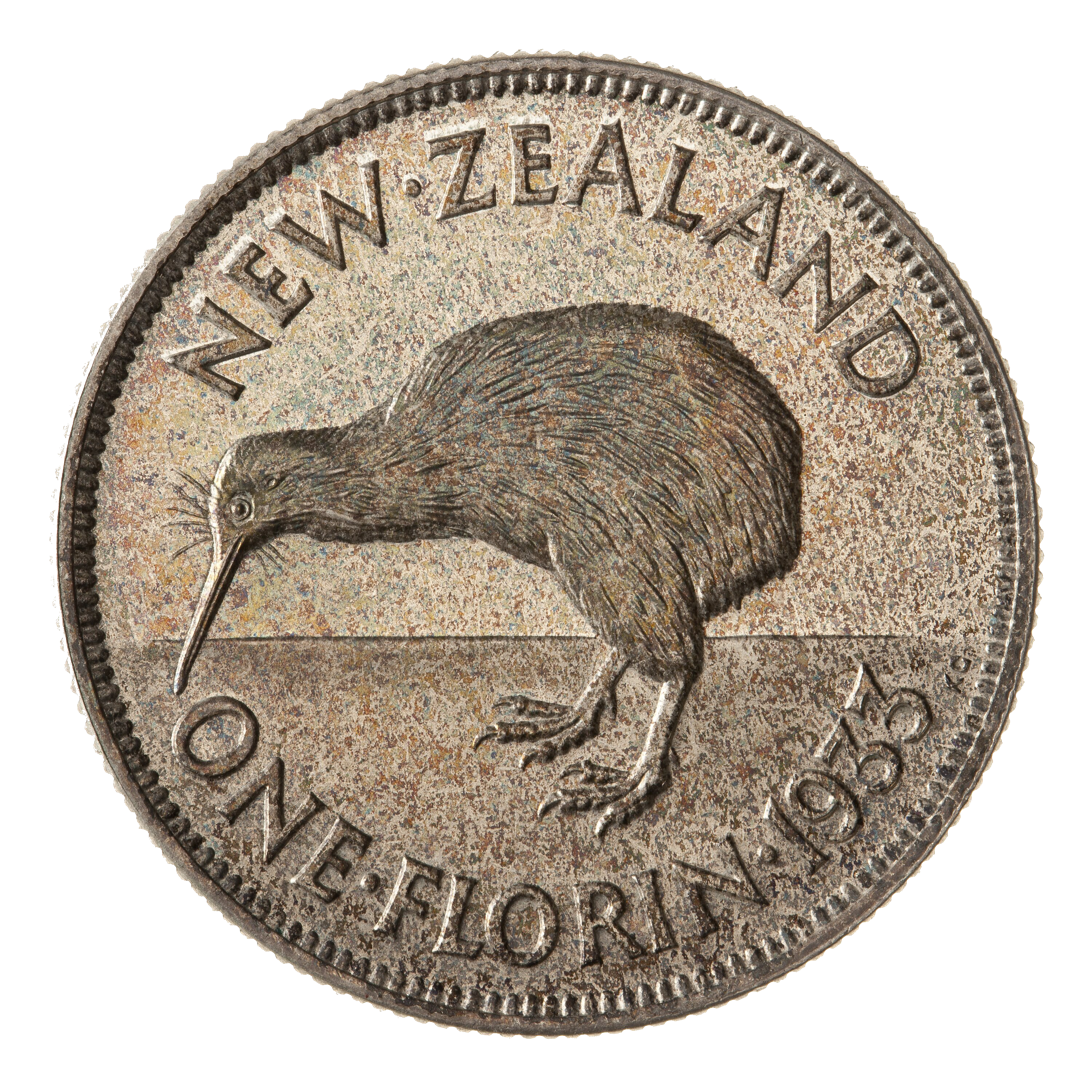
- Design: A kiwi
- Designer: George Kruger Gray

The florin is a coin issued for the New Zealand pound from 1933 to 1965, equal to two shillings or twenty-four pence. The coin features a kiwi on the reverse and the reigning monarch on the obverse. It was introduced in 1933 as part of the first issue of New Zealand pound coinage, due to shortages of British silver coins resulting from the devaluation of local currency relative to the pound sterling. A lengthy design process was further protracted due to differing proposed design motifs between the Royal Mint, supporting a reverse design featuring heraldic ships, and the Gordon Coates–appointed Coinage Committee's proposed kiwi design. This disagreement led to almost a dozen proposed designs and revisions before the finalised issue entered circulation in February 1934. Initially struck in silver by the Royal Mint to replace the previous imperial florin, it was struck in cupronickel from 1947 due to rising precious metal prices. While proposed as the base of a decimalised New Zealand coinage since the 1930s, the florin was ultimately replaced in 1967 by the coinage of the New Zealand dollar. Florins remained legal tender with a value of 20 cents until 31 October 2006.

== Background ==
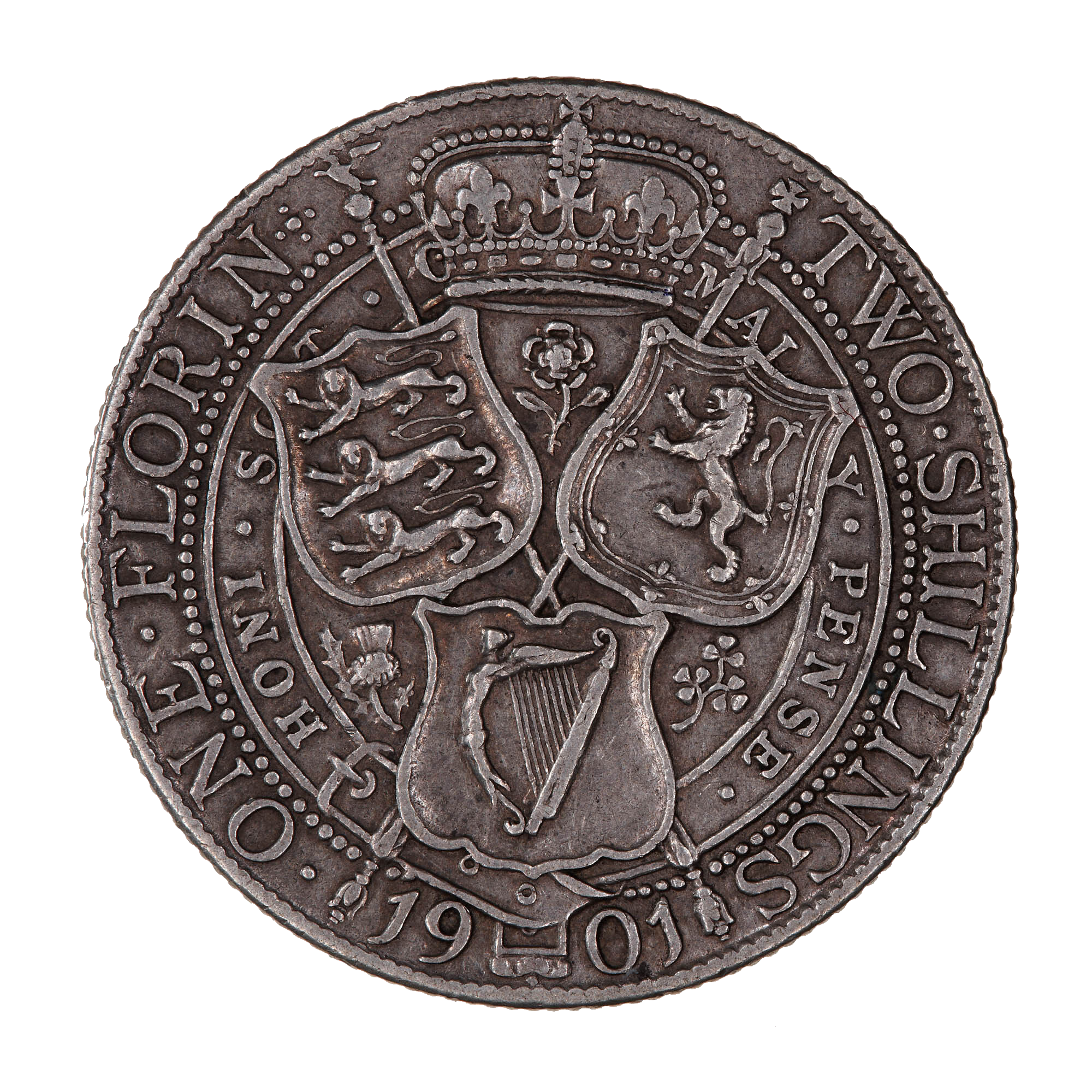
British florins circulated in New Zealand prior to 1933.

The British florin (or two-shilling piece) was a large silver coin, first entering circulation under Victoria in 1849. It began to circulate in New Zealand during the mid-19th century alongside various other silver coinage, including American, Spanish, French, and Dutch issues and with other British silver denominations. The share of British silver greatly increased following the confirmation of the pound sterling as the sole legal tender in 1858. Australia began issuing its own coinage in 1910, including the Australian florin. Widespread circulation of Australian silver coinage in New Zealand began in 1930, when Australia devalued the Australian pound relative to the pound sterling. Large amounts of the devalued Australian currency began to flood into New Zealand, eventually making up 30-40% of all coinage in circulation by early 1933. Counterfeited silver coins, especially British and Australian florins (as the largest silver coinage in common circulation), became common throughout the country.

New Zealand followed in devaluing the New Zealand pound in 1933, triggering mass smuggling of silver coinage to Britain and its other colonial possessions. After several decades of proposals, the New Zealand government pursued the creation of a domestic coinage the same year. The Coinage Act 1933, defined the florin as a silver coin of 11.31 grams, minted in silver of .500 fineness. Unlike in Australian coinage, the florin was not the largest common denomination, as a half-crown with a value of 2½ shillings was produced. Although domestic firms offered to produce the coinage, the New Zealand government deemed that domestic facilities were not sufficient for mass production, and contracted with the Royal Mint for minting.

== Design ==
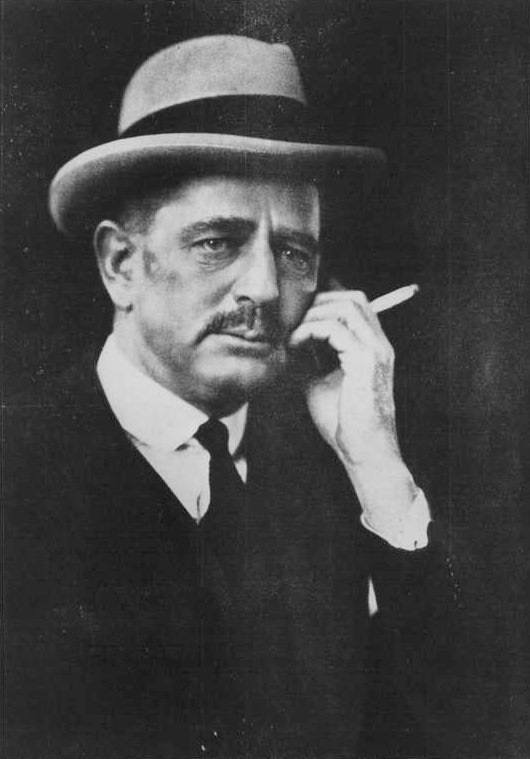
Gordon Coates was heavily involved with the design of the florin.

All coinage obverses from the initial 1933 issue featured a crowned bust of George V designed by Percy Metcalfe, initially for use on the Southern Rhodesian pound. This was based on an older crowned bust by Australian sculptor Bertram Mackennal, used on the coinage of other British colonies and dominions. Reverse designs were a matter of collaboration between the Royal Mint and the New Zealand government. Deputy Master of the Royal Mint Robert Johnson, inspired by Percy Metcalfe's 1928 designs for coinage of the Irish Free State, suggested the use of local birds as design motifs, alongside elements of the coat of arms of New Zealand for larger denominations. Local artists and members of the New Zealand Numismatic Society were consulted throughout the design process, but British designers were tasked with creating an initial series of designs, despite requests from local art societies for domestic artistry of the coins. Metcalfe and George Kruger Gray were experienced artists who had each previously designed coinage for several other British dominions and colonies. The two were tasked to submit designs for each of the five initial silver denominations of coinage.

Initially holding to Johnson's suggestion of heraldic motifs, both designers submitted designs for the florin to the Royal Mint Advisory Committee, composed of various British artists and heraldists, as well as several New Zealand ministers. Kruger Gray's initial design featured a heraldic lion holding a Union Jack – used at the time as the royal crest of New Zealand – surrounded by a wavelike design inspired by Māori whakairo. Metcalfe submitted two designs: the first featured the fleece of the New Zealand arms overlaid by the stars of the Southern Cross; the latter, preferred by the committee, used the three lymphads (heraldic galleys) featured on the national arms arranged in a triangle, beneath the abbreviation "N·Z". After deliberations by the Advisory Committee, Kruger Gray was tasked to make a new pattern inspired by Metcalfe's lymphad design. Gray's model featured more elaborate renderings of the ships, alongside a fully spelled "New Zealand". Kruger Gray's initials, a small "KG" acronym, were made smaller, as Royal Mint advisors feared the name Kruger would draw uncomfortable local connotations with South African politician Paul Kruger.

=== Competing design committees ===
We cannot serve two masters in NZ and I think the [High Commissioner] will agree with me, that at our last meeting with the Premier and the other Ministers present, the Premier definitely decided that the Committee was going beyond its province in laying down the law about designs at all, and that in any case his decision was final.

— Robert Johnson, 23 August 1933

New Zealand's prime minister George Forbes held a very weak premiership, and finance minister Gordon Coates served de facto as acting prime minister, especially during Forbes' extended stays in Britain. In July 1933, Coates appointed a Coinage Design Committee, composed of various local artists alongside members of the New Zealand Numismatic Society. This new committee took significant issue with the approved coinage designs, describing the ships on Metcalfe's and Kruger Gray's florin as unrepresentative of those used in New Zealand history. The Design Committee instead requested a naturalistic rendering of the kiwi, previously featured in an abstract fashion on a pattern shilling, to be used as the central motif of the florin reverse. The committee considered it important for the florin to feature New Zealand's national bird, as it was proposed as the base coin of a future decimalised coinage system. Kruger Gray disliked the requested modifications to the kiwi design, but was heartened to hear from Robert Johnson, explaining that Prime Minister Forbes still wished to use the Advisory Committee's original design suggestions.

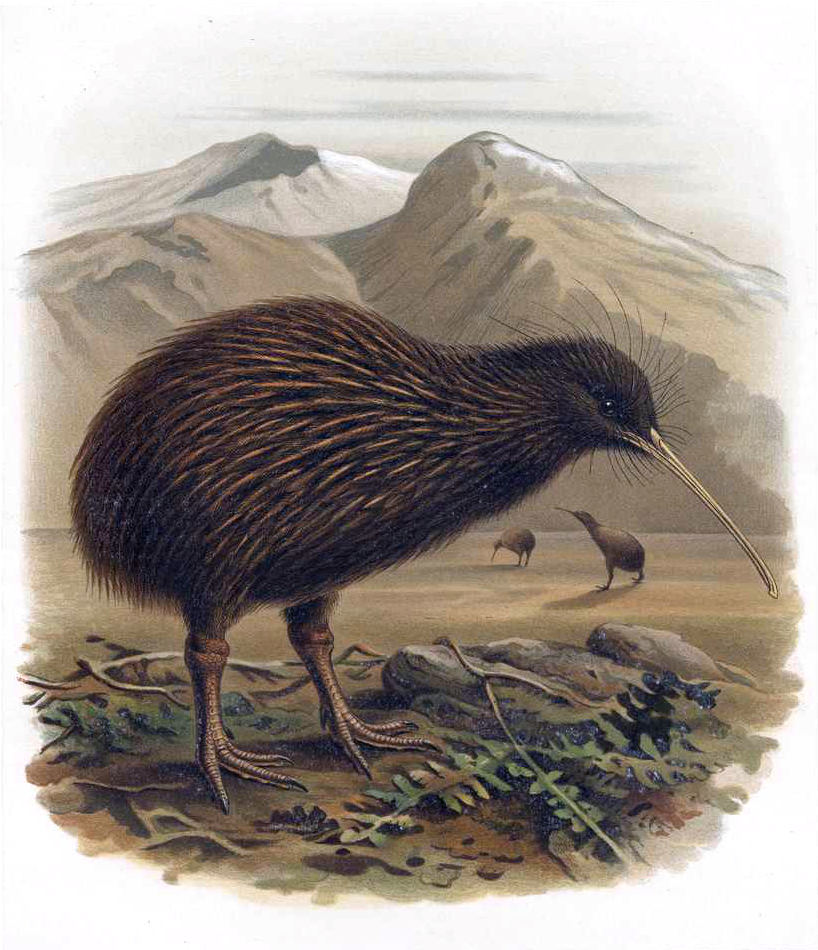
A North Island brown kiwi (Apteryx mantelli), the kiwi species featured on the florin

Kruger Gray continued work on the Advisory Committee's approved design, rendering the ships smaller and writing "TWO SHILLINGS" in lieu of "FLORIN" at the base of the reverse. Coates contacted the Royal Mint, reiterating the request of the Design Committee for new designs, alongside further specifications for various coinage. By August, the Advisory Committee decided to continue onward with the original designs, citing the urgent need for domestic coinage and the delay any such redesign would cause. The possibility of the redesigns' issue being postponed until 1934 was proposed in a draft telegram to Coates. Privately, the Advisory Committee aimed to stall until Forbes' return to New Zealand on 20 September, upon which Coates would lose acting ministerial powers and work could continue on the original designs. However, Forbes ultimately conceded to Coates and the Coinage Design Committee upon his return to New Zealand, alerting the Royal Mint in early October to continue with the redesign. Kruger Gray scrapped his lymphad design and began work on the new kiwi design.

The Royal Mint originally planned to directly transfer the pattern shilling design to the florin, preserving the kowhaiwhai motif for consistency with the half-crown. Coates rejected this proposal, writing "Kiwi design originally suggested by Mint for 1/- [...] not acceptable. Pending the receipt by you of sketchings, please see [...] Oliver's New Zealand Birds [...] Maori ornamentation to be eliminated."

The "pine cone" kiwi was thus replaced with a naturalistic depiction based on a North Island kiwi traced from Walter Oliver's ornithological reference work. This bird faced left with its head bowed, a horizon line was added to the relief, and "FLORIN" returned as the coin's inscribed denomination. Johnson took issue with the placement of Kruger Gray's initials, writing that the design looked as if the kiwi was "suffering from so violent a need to [defecate] that he had propelled the pellet out with considerable violence". He suggested Kruger Gray place a silver fern to the rear of the kiwi to minimise this effect. Instead, Kruger Gray shrunk his initials and shifted them towards the rim of the coin, in line with the date.

Despite significant delays, work on the coinage continued through November 1933. The Royal Mint had become impatient with Coates' continued intervention in the design process. Coates sent a "grotesque" sketch of a kiwi to the Royal Mint, which was ignored in favour of Gray's pattern rendering. The coins entered production in 1934, with the first florins entering the country at Wellington on 17 February. The coins were still dated 1933, despite the delays. The florin's reverse design would be unmodified until decimalisation in 1967, and its obverse shared the renderings of the British monarchs featured on all other New Zealand coinage. Dies were prepared for Edward VIII's reign, but upon his abdication were destroyed before any coins could be struck.

=== Reception ===
The new florin became popular with the New Zealand public. Ethnologist Johannes Andersen, quoted in Dominion, described the florin as particularly well-designed, with the hairy feathers and bristles of the kiwi depicted faithfully; however, he suggested the horizontal ground was not apparent in the design, and should be stippled to produce a more pronounced effect.

== Mintage and production ==
The initial mintage of 2,100,000 florins in 1933 was followed by an additional 2,850,000 in 1934, but mintages sharply declined to only a few hundred thousand in the years following. Following the production of 1,200,000 with the ascension of George VI in 1937, no florins were minted at all in 1938 and 1939. Afterwards, mintages consistently alternated between a hundred thousand and several million, besides a seven-year gap from 1954 to 1960 when no florins were produced. Extremely small proof mintages began alongside the initial release in 1933, although the mintage numbers increased as they were periodically issued over the following decades. Unlike Australia, no commemorative issues of the florin were produced, with New Zealand instead issuing commemorative crowns and half-crowns. Due to high prices of silver in the years following World War II, previously silver denominations (including the florin) were instead made of a cupronickel alloy from 1947, besides a commemorative crown issue in 1949. Much silver coinage was recalled from circulation and melted down by banks. While initially proposed as the base of a decimal coinage, the denomination was abolished in 1967 in favour of the new denominations of the New Zealand dollar.

George V Florin Mintage
Date	1933	1934	1935	1936
Mintage	2,100,000	2,850,000	755,000	150,000

George VI Florin Mintage
Date	1937	1938	1939	1940	1941	1942	1943	1944	1945	1946	1947	1948	1949	1950	1951	1952
Mintage	1,190,000	0	0	500,000	820,000	150,000	1,400,000	140,000	515,000	1,200,000	2,500,000	1,750,000	3,500,000	3,500,000	2,000,000	0

Elizabeth II Florin Mintage
Date	1953	1954	1955	1956	1957	1958	1959	1960	1961	1962	1963	1964	1965
Mintage	250,000	0	0	0	0	0	0	0	1,500,000	1,500,000	100,000	2,000,000	9,450,000

== Bibliography ==
- Cuhaj, George S. (2014). 2014 Standard Catalog of World Coins (41st ed.). p. 1633.
- Familton, Robert John; McLintock, A. H. (1966). "Coinage". An Encyclopaedia of New Zealand. Archived from the original on 4 November 2023.
- Hargreaves, R. P. (1972). "New Zealand Coinage". From Beads to Banknotes. Dunedin: John McIndoe. pp. 141–160.
- Matthews, Ken (March 2003). "The Legal History of Money in New Zealand" (PDF). Reserve Bank of New Zealand Bulletin. 66 (1): 40–49. Archived (PDF) from the original on 1 November 2023.
- Stocker, Mark (2005). "'A Very Satisfactory Series': The 1933 New Zealand Coinage Designs" (PDF). British Numismatic Journal. 75: 142–160. Archived (PDF) from the original on 8 November 2023.
