= Sixpence (New Zealand coin) =

Former denomination of the New Zealand pound

- New Zealand
- Value: 6d (£NZ)
- Mass: 2.83 g
- Diameter: 19.43 mm
- Edge: Milled
- Composition: 1933–1946: 50% silver, 50% quaternary alloy 1947–1965: cupronickel (75% copper, 25% nickel)
- Years of minting: 1933–1965

Obverse
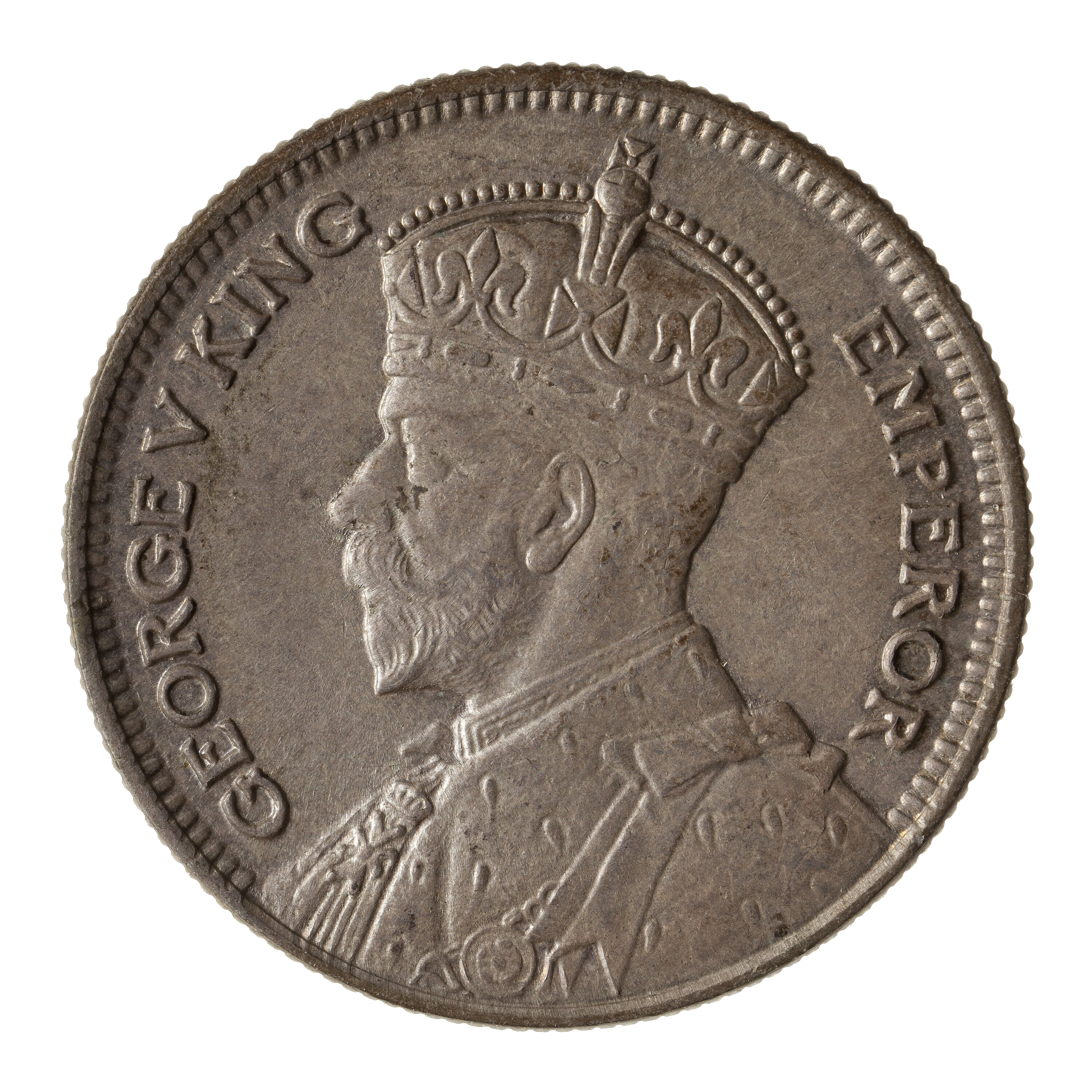
- Design: Crowned bust of George V
- Designer: Percy Metcalfe

Reverse
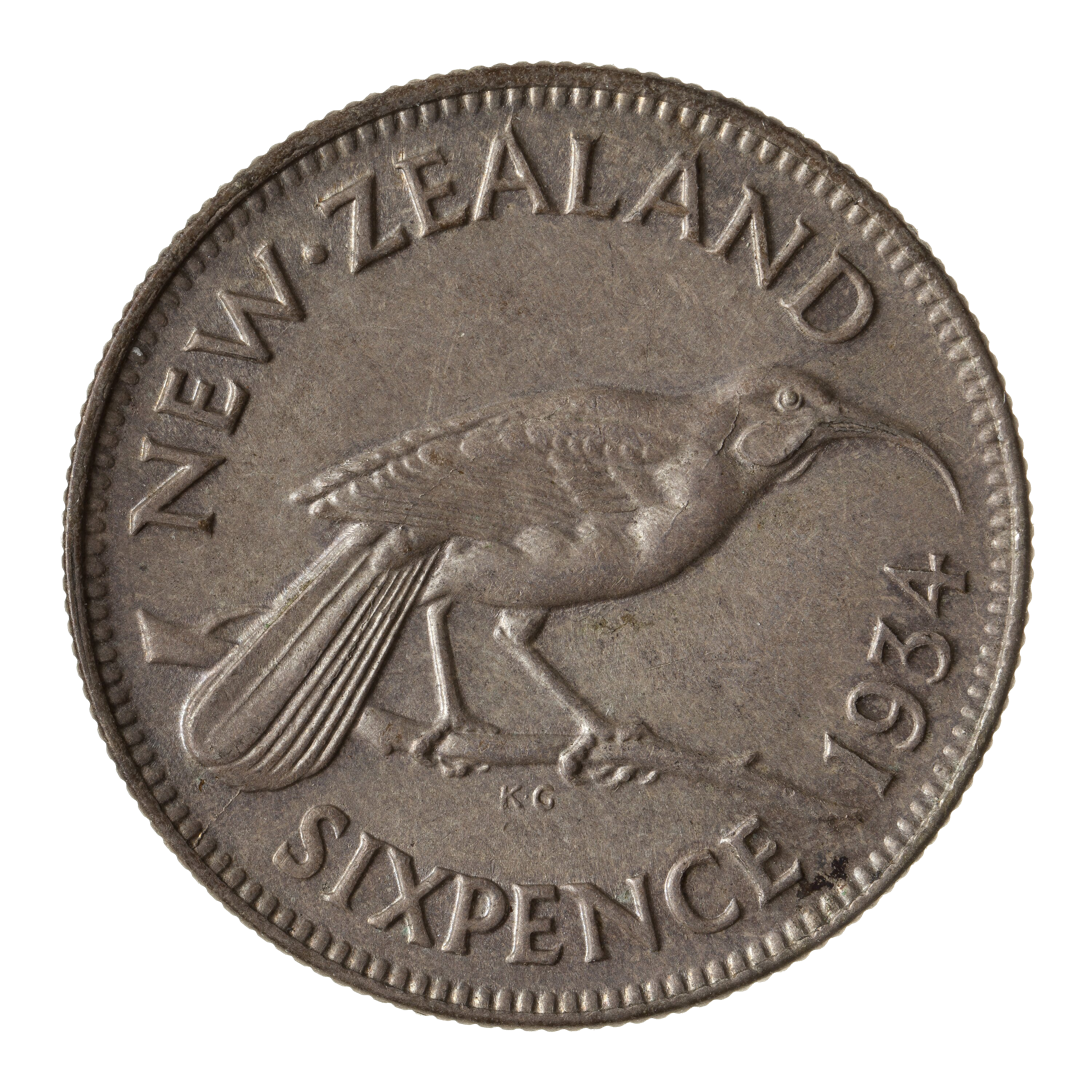
- Design: Huia perched atop a branch.
- Designer: George Kruger Gray

The New Zealand sixpence is a coin of the New Zealand pound issued from 1933 to 1965. Equal to twice a threepence or half a shilling, the sixpence was one of five denominations of silver coins introduced in the initial issue of New Zealand coinage in 1933. Early designs for the coin featuring spears and silver ferns were rejected by design committees in Britain and New Zealand. The coin's final reverse, designed by George Kruger Gray, features a female huia, an extinct New Zealand bird, perched atop a branch. Issued in 50% silver until a postwar rise in silver prices triggered a shift to cupronickel in 1947, the coin was minted with relative consistency until 1965, when it was discontinued following decimalisation and the adoption of the New Zealand dollar.

== Background ==
British silver coinage, including sixpences, first circulated in New Zealand during the early 19th century alongside various other silver coinage, including American, Spanish, French, and Dutch issues. The British pound sterling was confirmed as the sole legal tender in 1858, but had in effect been the sole circulating currency since 1847. Australia began issuing its own coinage in 1910, including the Australian sixpence. Widespread circulation of the Australian silver coinage in New Zealand began in 1930, when Australia devalued the Australian pound relative to the pound sterling. Large amounts of the devalued Australian currency began to flood into New Zealand, eventually making up 30–40% of all coinage in circulation by early 1933. The counterfeiting of silver coins also increased during this period.

New Zealand followed in devaluing the New Zealand pound in 1933, triggering mass smuggling of silver coinage to Britain and its other colonial possessions. After several decades of proposals, the New Zealand government pursued the creation of a domestic coinage the same year. The Coinage Act of 1933 outlined the weights and sizes of the six denominations of New Zealand silver coinage, defining the sixpence as a coin weighing 2.83 grams, with a fineness of 0.500. The sixpence was worth two threepences, or half a shilling. Although domestic firms offered to produce the coinage, the New Zealand government deemed that domestic facilities were not sufficient for mass production, and contracted with the British Royal Mint for minting.

== Design ==
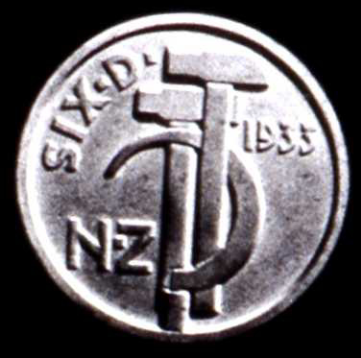
Metcalfe's hammer and sickle pattern was rejected due to potential communist associations.

All coinage obverses from the initial 1933 issue featured a crowned bust of George V designed by Percy Metcalfe, initially for use on the Southern Rhodesian pound. This was based on an older crowned bust by Australian sculptor Bertram Mackennal, used on the coinage of other British colonies and dominions. Reverse designs were a matter of collaboration between the Royal Mint and the New Zealand government. Local artists and members of the New Zealand Numismatic Society were consulted throughout the design process, but British artists were tasked with creating an initial series of designs, despite requests from local art societies for domestic artistry of the coins. This task was given to Metcalfe and George Kruger Gray, another prolific Royal Mint designer. The two were tasked to submit designs for each of the five initial silver denominations of coinage.

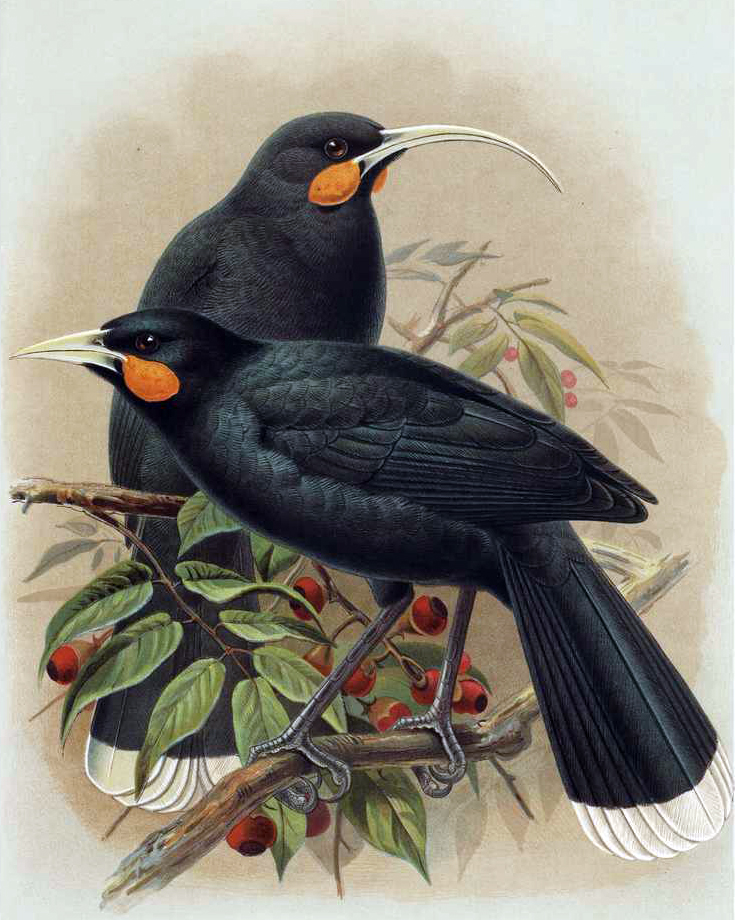
Huia, as depicted in A History of the Birds of New Zealand

Metcalfe submitted a design for the sixpence featuring two hammers superimposed atop a sickle, most likely inspired by the mining hammers featured on the national coat of arms. This design, due to its resemblance to the Soviet Union's hammer and sickle iconography, was strongly rejected by the Royal Mint's Advisory Committee for "undesirable political associations." Two alternate designs for the sixpence from Metcalfe, both featuring a stylised six surrounded by the letters "NZ", were described as banal and austere.

Kruger Gray submitted a design featuring crossed taiaha, similar in design to his earlier Southern Rhodesian threepence. This design was rejected by the Advisory Committee due to the impossibility of showing the majority of the spears' hafts. The committee recommended an alternate design containing a silver fern motif; his updated model showed two crossed ferns.

New Zealand's prime minister George Forbes held a weak premiership, and finance minister Gordon Coates served de facto as acting prime minister, especially during Forbes' extended stays in Britain. In July 1933, Coates appointed a Coinage Design Committee, separate from the Royal Mint, composed of various local artists alongside members of the New Zealand Numismatic Society. This new committee took significant issue with the Advisory Committee's approved coinage designs. A huia was suggested by the Design Committee, as fern designs were considered difficult to replicate on coinage.

Kruger Gray referenced a huia depiction by J.G. Keulemans in A History of the Birds of New Zealand. Choosing a female bird to its curved beak, he rendered the bird on a branch against instructions for a plain field, claiming "I do not see how one can use the Huia without a branch!" Following examination by the New Zealand committee and small modifications to the branch, the coin was approved for production. The first sixpences, dated 1933, entered the country in January 1934.

=== Reception ===
Ethnologist Johannes Andersen, writing for The Dominion, described the huia on the coin's reverse as "attractive", but unsatisfactorily designed, due to poorly-rendered wings and a lack of differentiation on the white feathers at the end of the bird's tail.

== Mintage ==
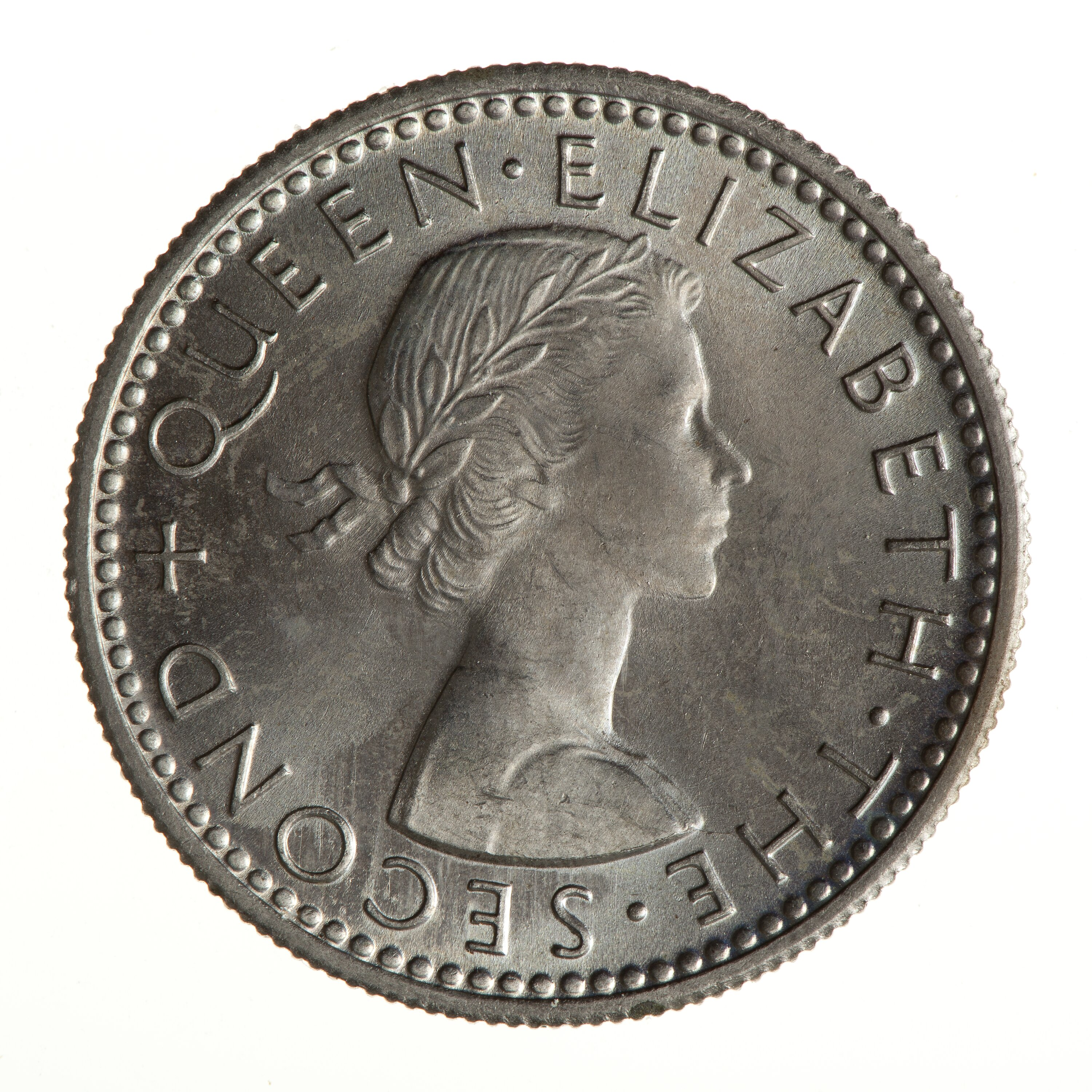
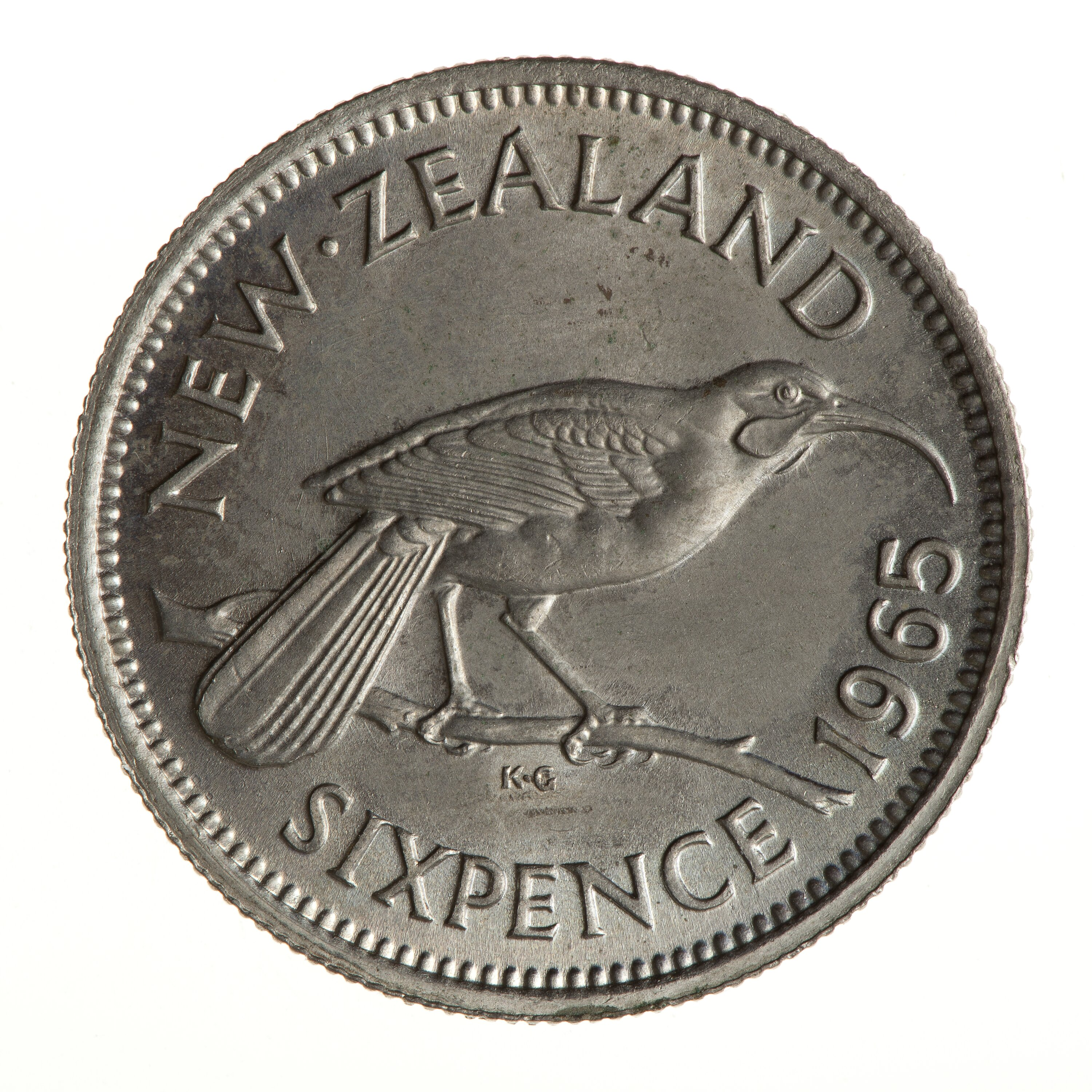
Sixpences were last minted in 1965.

Sixpence mintages were generally consistent throughout their period of circulation, with no key dates. They were issued for every year except 1938 and 1949. Due to high prices of silver in the years following World War II, previously silver denominations (including the threepence) were instead made of a cupronickel alloy from 1947, besides a crown issue in 1949. Much silver coinage was recalled from circulation and melted down by banks. The sixpence was abolished in 1967 in favour of the new denominations of the New Zealand dollar.

Other than proof sets issued in 1935 and 1953, proof sixpences were issued in extremely small numbers during most years of their production. Only twenty proof sixpences were made in 1933 and 1934. 25,000 "prooflike" sixpences were issued as part of a 1965 collector's set, alongside 10 proofs.

George V sixpence mintage
Date	1933	1934	1935	1936
Mintage	3,000,000	3,600,000	560,000	1,480,000

George VI sixpence mintage
Date	1937	1938	1939	1940	1941	1942	1943	1944	1945	1946	1947	1948	1949	1950	1951	1952
Mintage	1,280,000	0	700,000	800,000	440,000	360,000	1,800,000	1,160,000	940,000	2,120,000	3,200,000	2,000,000	0	800,000	1,800,000	3,200,000

Elizabeth II sixpence mintage
Date	1953	1954	1955	1956	1957	1958	1959	1960	1961	1962	1963	1964	1965
Mintage	1,200,000	1,200,000	1,600,000	2,000,000	2,400,000	3,000,000	2,000,000	1,600,000	800,000	1,200,000	800,000	3,800,000	8,600,000
