= Threepence (New Zealand coin) =

New Zealand coin

- New Zealand
- Value: 3d (£NZ)
- Mass: 1.41 g
- Diameter: 16.3 mm
- Edge: Plain
- Composition: 1933–1946: 50% silver, 50% quaternary alloy 1947–1965: cupronickel (75% copper, 25% nickel)
- Years of minting: 1933–1965

Obverse
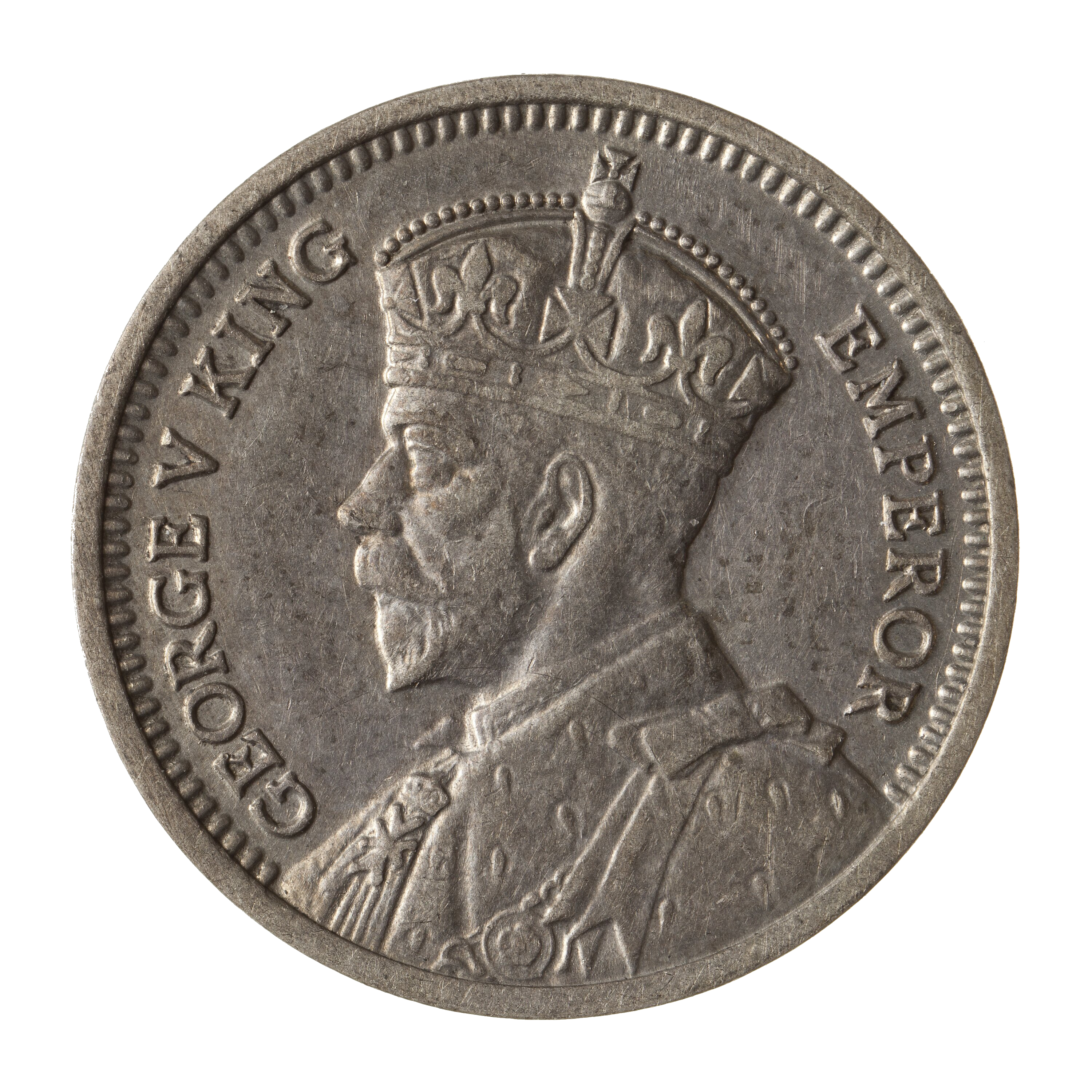
- Design: Crowned bust of George V
- Designer: Percy Metcalfe

Reverse
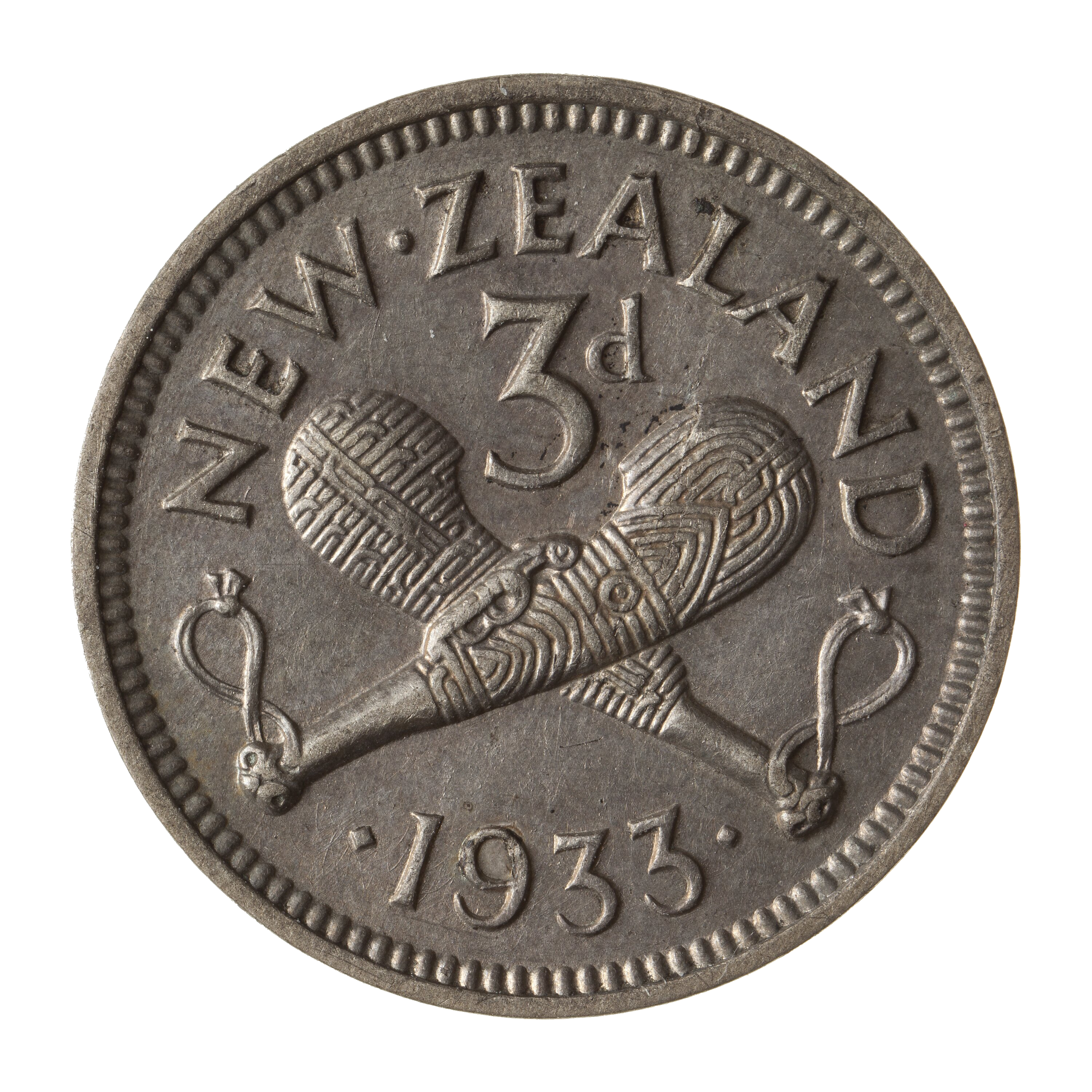
- Design: Crossed patu clubs.
- Designer: George Kruger Gray

The New Zealand threepence is a coin of the New Zealand pound issued from 1933 to 1965. Equal to three pence, the coin was the smallest in size of all New Zealand pound coinage and the smallest in denomination of the initial 1933 issue of New Zealand pound coinage, produced due to shortages of British silver coins resulting from the devaluation of local currency relative to the pound sterling. British artist George Kruger Gray designed the coin's reverse design after an earlier pattern design featuring a hei-tiki was rejected by a coinage design committee organised by Gordon Coates. It features two crossed patu (ornamental Māori clubs) below the label "3d". Initially struck in silver by the Royal Mint, it was struck in cupronickel from 1947 onward due to rising precious metal prices. Following decimalisation in 1967, the threepence was replaced by the coinage of the New Zealand dollar.

== Background ==
British threepence first circulated in New Zealand during the early 19th century alongside various other silver coinage, including American, Spanish, French, and Dutch issues alongside other British silver denominations. The British pound sterling was confirmed as the sole legal tender in 1858 but had in effect been the sole circulating currency since 1847. Australia began issuing its own coinage in 1910, including the Australian threepence. Widespread circulation of the Australian silver coinage in New Zealand began in 1930, when Australia devalued the Australian pound relative to the pound sterling. Large amounts of the devalued Australian currency began to flood into New Zealand, eventually making up 30–40% of all coinage in circulation by early 1933. The counterfeiting of silver coins also increased during this period.

New Zealand followed in devaluing the New Zealand pound in 1933, triggering mass smuggling of silver coinage to Britain and its other colonial possessions. After several decades of proposals, the New Zealand government pursued the creation of a domestic coinage the same year. The Coinage Act 1933 outlined the weights and sizes of the six denominations of New Zealand silver coinage, defining the threepence as a coin weighing 1.41 grams, with a silver fineness of .500. The coin was worth one quarter of a shilling. Although domestic firms offered to produce the coinage, the New Zealand government deemed that domestic facilities were not sufficient for mass production and contracted with the Royal Mint for minting.

== Design ==
All coinage obverses from the initial 1933 issue featured a crowned bust of George V designed by Royal Mint designer Percy Metcalfe, initially for use on the Southern Rhodesian pound. This was based on an older crowned bust by Australian sculptor Bertram Mackennal, used on the coinage of other British colonies and dominions. Reverse designs were a matter of collaboration between the Royal Mint Advisory Committee, headed by Deputy Master Robert Johnson, and the New Zealand government. Local artists and members of the New Zealand Numismatic Society were consulted throughout the design process, but British designers were tasked with creating an initial series of designs, despite requests from local art societies for domestic artistry of the coins. Metcalfe and George Kruger Gray were experienced artists who had each previously designed coinage for several other British dominions and colonies. The two were tasked to submit designs for each of the five initial silver denominations of coinage.

Kruger Gray's threepence pattern featured kotiate (a short Māori hand weapon) above two crossed tewhatewha (long axe-shaped Māori clubs). Numismatic historian and Coinage Design Committee member Allan Sutherland described this design as "very effective", but it was rejected by the Advisory Committee, alongside Kruger Gray's similar sixpence design. Metcalfe submitted two threepence designs. The first was highly minimalist, featuring the Roman numeral III between the letters N and Z, both letters being 90-degree flipped images of the other. This minimalist design, recalling Metcalfe's similar sixpence proposal, was rejected without further comment in favor of his Māori-inspired design, featuring a hei-tiki.

Metcalfe's hei-tiki threepence featured the figure in a central vertical strip between a large "3" and "D". (Note: Pence was frequently abbreviated "d.", stemming from the Roman denarius denomination.) Sir Thomas Wilford, the New Zealand High Commissioner, was particularly fond of this design, believing it would be instantly recognizable to New Zealanders. Kruger Gray was asked to model a new pattern off of Metcalfe's base, in order to standardize the lettering of the coinage.

=== Redesigns ===
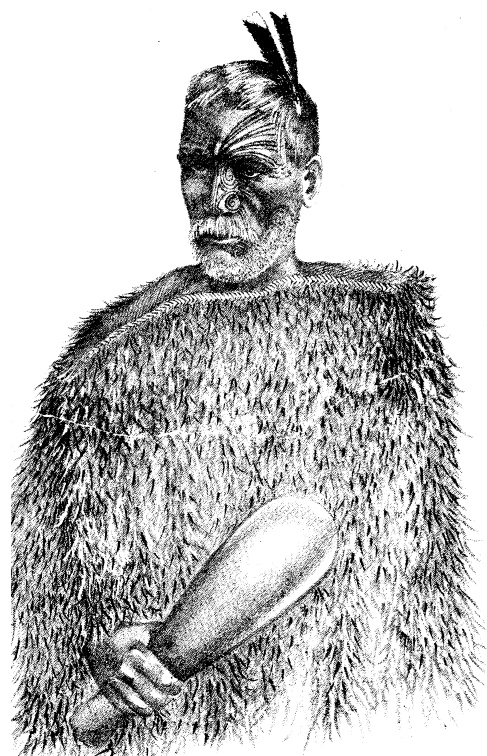
A Māori chief holding a patu.

New Zealand's prime minister George Forbes held a very weak premiership, and finance minister Gordon Coates served as de facto acting prime minister, especially during Forbes' extended stays in Britain. In July 1933, Coates appointed a Coinage Design Committee, composed of various local artists alongside members of the New Zealand Numismatic Society. Sutherland was highly critical of the tiki, describing it as a fertility charm inappropriate for the modern age, incorrectly believing the figure to represent a human foetus. Coates ordered the design to be abandoned; however, in 1940, the hei-tiki motif would be re-used in essentially unmodified form for the halfpenny. Despite initially calling for the "elimination of all native ornament" on the coins, Coates's Coinage Design Committee called for the threepence reverse to comprise "two Māori panels, crossed at right angles with figure 3d in clear space in centre."

This proposal was baffling to Kruger Gray, who was not given any illustrations or instructions on how to design the panels. In August, Coates offered an alternate design suggestion, a stringed mere. Although he experimented with individual meres at Coates's suggestion, he submitted a design crossing two of the clubs, reminiscent of his earlier Southern Rhodesian sixpence. Coates initially protested the modification but conceded after Kruger Gray argued that a single mere would create a design that was lopsided and difficult to strike.

By late 1933, the basic design had been accepted, and Kruger Gray created a final pattern incorporating traditional ornamentation. Referencing Augustus Hamilton's 1901 book, Maori Art, he based the clubs off of two antique patu: one from the Ngāti Tūmatakōkiri, as well as a club from the vicinity of Lake Waikaremoana held at the Otago Museum. The threepence was the last design of the initial series of coinage to be completed. The coins entered production by the following year, with the first 1933-dated threepences reaching New Zealand in mid-March 1934. British threepences, like all other pound sterling coinage, ceased to be legal tender on 1 February 1935.

== Reception ==
The threepence were frequently likened by the public to bottles of ginger beer. Defending the coins, ethnologist Johannes Andersen described the patu design as unfairly criticised by ignorant New Zealanders, and proposed that foreigners encountering the coins would learn about the country's culture from investigating the designs. Andersen, however, raised that the patu were rendered upside-down and suggested that this should be altered in future issues of the coinage.

== Mintage and production ==
Threepence mintages were relatively consistent compared to other New Zealand coins. Only in 1938 and 1949 were none produced, although an extremely low mintage of 40,000 led to a 1935 key date for the coin. Several million threepence were minted most years from 1933 to 1965. Due to high prices of silver in the years following World War II, previously silver denominations (including the threepence) were instead made of a cupronickel alloy from 1947, besides a crown issue in 1949. Much silver coinage was recalled from circulation and melted down by banks. The threepence was abolished in 1967 in favour of the new denominations of the New Zealand dollar.

Proof threepences were included in proof sets produced in 1935 and 1953, as well as a prooflike set produced in 1965.

George V Threepence Mintage (thousands)
Date	1933	1934	1935	1936
Mintage	6,000	6,000	40	2,760

George VI Threepence Mintage (thousands)
Date	1937	1938	1939	1940	1941	1942	1943	1944	1945	1946	1947	1948	1949	1950	1951	1952
Mintage	2,880	0	0	3,000	2,000	1,760	3,120	4,400	2,840	2,520	6,080	6,400	4,000	800	3,600	8,000

Elizabeth II Threepence Mintage (thousands)
Date	1953	1954	1955	1956	1957	1958	1959	1960	1961	1962	1963	1964	1965
Mintage	4,000	4,000	4,000	4,800	8,000	4,000	4,000	4,000	4,800	6,000	4,000	6,400	4,200
