= 1949 New Zealand crown =

Commemorative coin of the New Zealand pound

Crown
- New Zealand
- Value: 5/— (5 shillings, or ¼ £NZ)
- Mass: 28.27 g
- Diameter: 38.61 mm
- Edge: Milled
- Shape: Round
- Composition: 50% Ag
- Years of minting: 1949
- Mintage: 200,020

Obverse
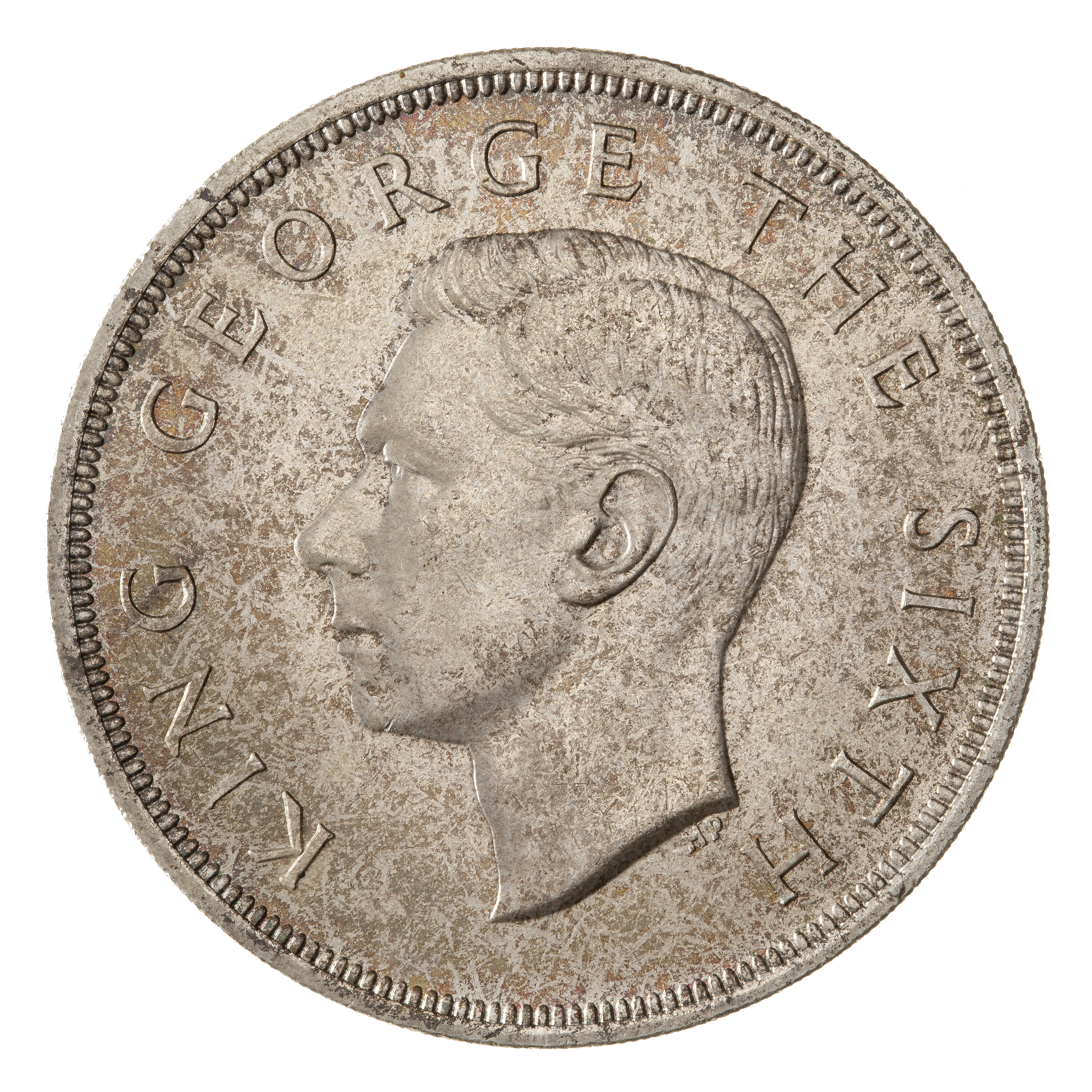
- Design: Bust of George VI
- Designer: Humphrey Paget

Reverse
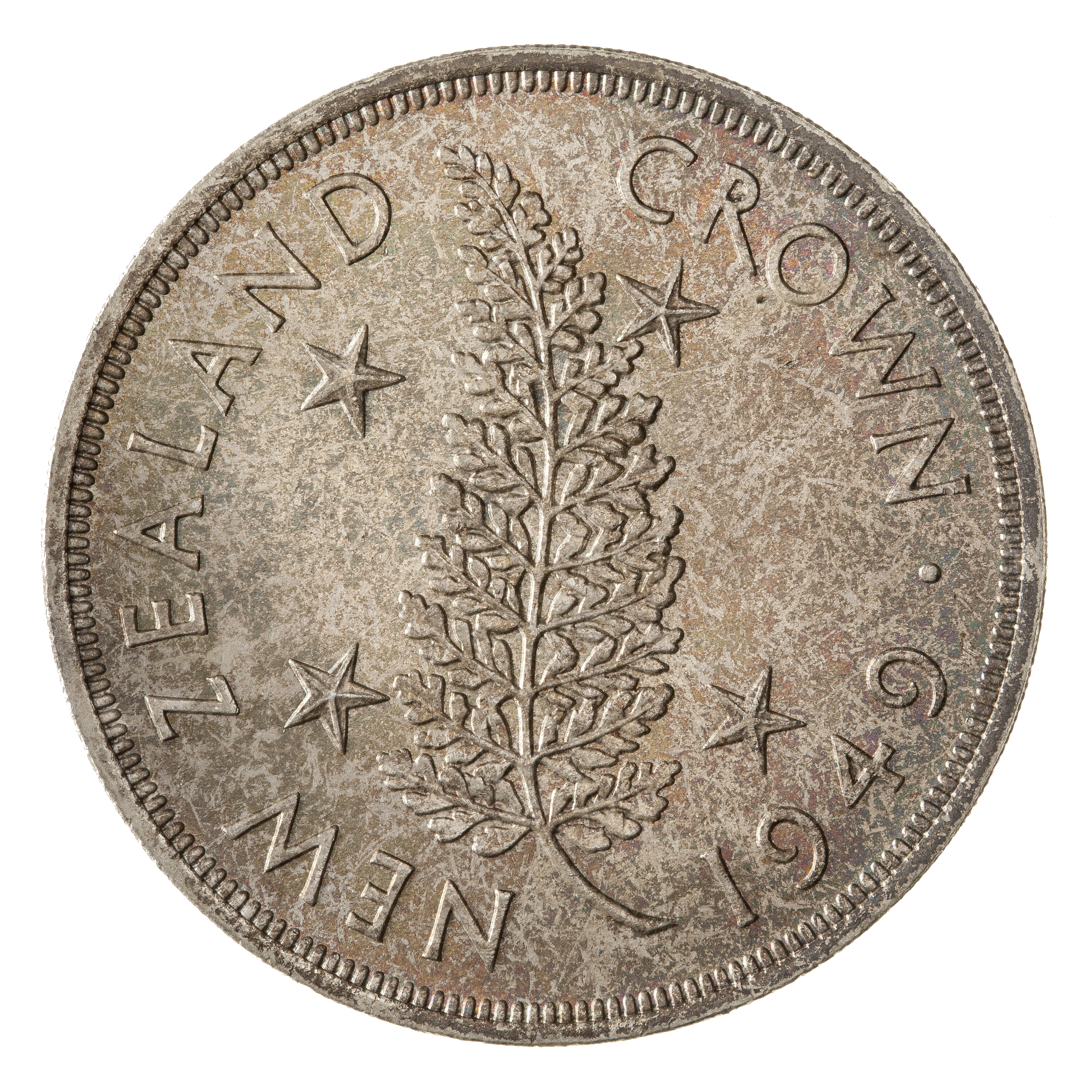
- Design: Silver fern surrounded by four stars of the Southern Cross
- Designer: James Berry

A commemorative crown coin of the New Zealand pound was produced for a planned visit by King George VI in 1949. Having first visited the country in 1927 in his duties as the Duke of York, proposals for a visit by the monarch to New Zealand in 1940 were postponed by the outbreak of World War II. A 1949 tour by the king and queen to Australia and New Zealand was announced in early 1948, the first visit of a reigning monarch to the dominion.

A Royal Numismatic Society of New Zealand proposal to issue a commemorative coin into circulation was supported by Minister of Finance Walter Nash. Sketches by New Zealand artist James Berry were modelled by Royal Mint designer Percy Metcalfe, and the coin entered production in late 1948. Citing declining health, the king indefinitely postponed the tour in November 1948, sparking fears by the Royal Numismatic Society that the coins may be melted down. The New Zealand government responded positively to calls to continue with the issue of the coinage. Made available at face value at local banks throughout New Zealand in November, the coins were additionally distributed to collectors overseas via consulates-general in Australia, Canada, the United States, and the United Kingdom.

== Background ==
In the decades following the introduction of a domestic pound coinage in favour of the previous British pound sterling coinage, New Zealand produced several commemorative coins. In 1935, the Waitangi crown, of a previously nonexistent five-shilling denomination, was produced in extremely limited numbers and sold to collectors, without entering circulation. With the Waitangi crown's release largely regarded as a failure, the 1940 Centennial half-crown was produced in far larger quantities and entered circulation at face value. Due to considerable demand from collectors, the coin quickly fell out of circulation.

=== Proposed royal visit ===
Albert, Duke of York, visited New Zealand in a 1927 royal tour, the fifth visit of a British prince to New Zealand. Following his ascension as George VI, another visit to New Zealand (corresponding to the New Zealand centennial celebrations of 1940) was considered, but disrupted due to the outbreak of World War II. A visit by George VI and Queen Elizabeth to Australia and New Zealand the following year was announced in March 1948, planned as the first visit of a sitting monarch to the dominion. A travel itinerary formed over the following days, with the King and Queen planned to sail to New Zealand in late February after sailing across the Pacific, before departing to Australia 16 days later.

== Production ==
In April 1948, the Royal Numismatic Society of New Zealand moved to suggest the creation of a commemorative crown coin in preparation for the royal visit. Following Australian consideration of a commemorative coin in a four-shilling denomination, Minister of Finance Walter Nash moved in May to support the Royal Numismatic Society's proposal of a circulating commemorative coin.

Following delays due to design conflicts, an obverse design was agreed upon by October 1948, and the coins entered production at the Royal Mint. New Zealand stamp designer James Berry, who had previously submitted unsuccessful designs for the Waitangi crown and the 1940 coinage series, designed a reverse featuring a silver fern (an endemic plant symbolic of New Zealand) surrounded by the four stars of the Southern Cross. Sketches of Berry's design were sent to Royal Mint designer Percy Metcalfe to be modelled. The obverse of the coin, like other New Zealand coinage of the period, shows an uncrowned bust of George VI designed by Humphrey Paget. Struck in .500 fineness, the 1949 crown was the sole circulating silver coin in New Zealand following the abandonment of silver coinage in favour of cupronickel in 1947.

=== Cancellation of royal visit ===
In November 1948, the king indefinitely postponed the planned royal visit to New Zealand and Australia, citing poor health. Due to the possibility of the issue being melted down, the Royal Numismatic Society issued a statement urging the continued distribution of the commemorative coinage despite the cancellation, citing the lack of any iconography specific to the royal visit on the coinage, alongside precedent for periodic circulating crown issues in the United Kingdom and South Africa. Nash responded in early December that no plans were in place to melt the coinage.

== Release ==
By late February 1949, originally planned as the date for the royal tour, the Reserve Bank of New Zealand communicated to the Royal Numismatic Society plans to collaborate with other trading banks in distributing the coins later in that year. By early November the majority of the issue had arrived in New Zealand, and the coins were made available to the public for face value at local banks on 17 November. Smaller amounts were made available to overseas collectors at New Zealand trade commissions and consulates-general at various cities in Australia, Canada, the United Kingdom, and the United States. In Dunedin, large queues formed outside banks in anticipation for the coins on 17 November. The Royal Numismatic Society provided one coin to all members, available at face value plus the cost of postage. A total of 200,020 crowns were produced in 1949, alongside an estimated three proofs. Two of the proof coins, certified by PCGS, reportedly sold in excess of US$15,000 at auction.
