= Shilling (New Zealand coin) =

Silver or cupronickel coin minted 1933–1965

- New Zealand
- Value: 1s (£NZ)
- Mass: 5.66 g
- Diameter: 23.65 mm
- Edge: Milled
- Composition: 1933–1946: 50% silver, 50% quaternary alloy 1947–1965: cupronickel (75% copper, 25% nickel)
- Years of minting: 1933–1965

Obverse
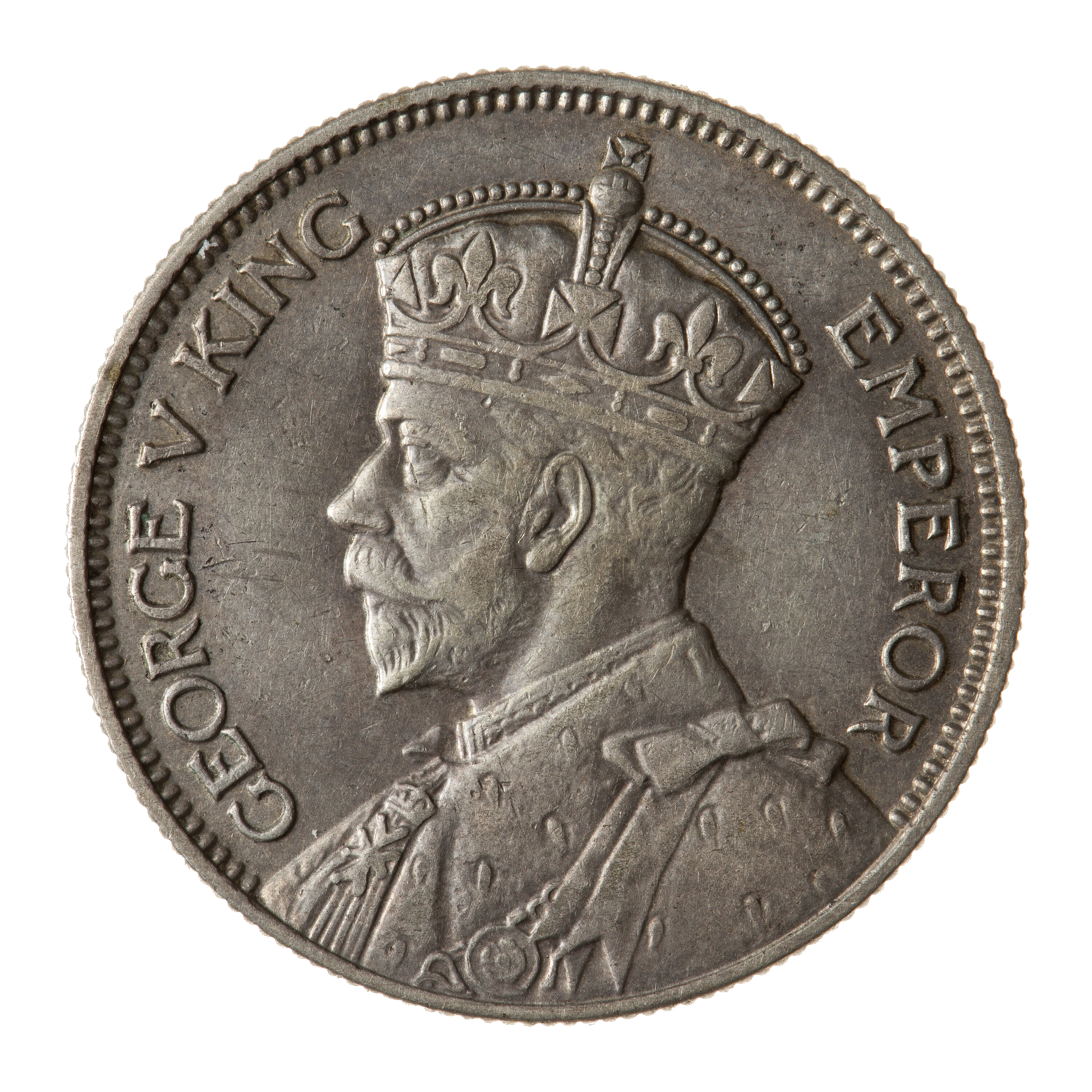
- Design: Crowned bust of George V
- Designer: Percy Metcalfe

Reverse
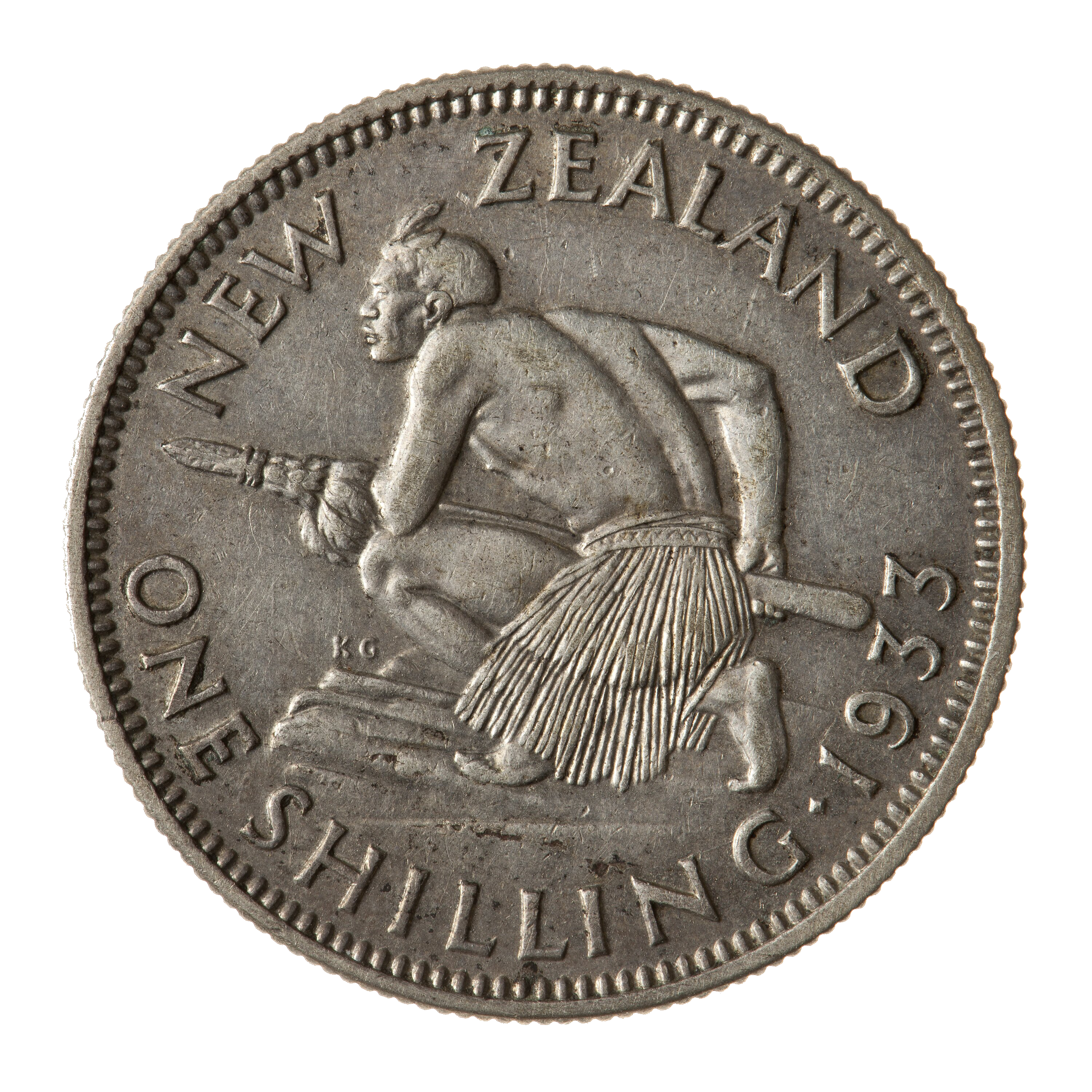
- Design: A Māori warrior in piupiu, crouched, holding a taiaha.
- Designer: George Kruger Gray

The New Zealand shilling was first issued in 1933 alongside four other denominations of New Zealand pound coinage, introduced due to shortages of comparable British silver coinage following the devaluation of the New Zealand pound relative to the pound sterling. Roughly 24 mm in diameter, it is slightly larger than the British coin it replaced. Worth twelve pence, the denomination was equal to half a florin, two sixpence, or two-fifths of a half-crown.

Early designs by Percy Metcalfe depicting a kiwi or crossed Māori tools were rejected by the Royal Mint. Another design featuring a kiwi by George Kruger Gray entered pattern production, but was dismissed by acting prime minister Gordon Coates in favour of a design depicting a Māori man supported by several Māori politicians. Featuring a shirtless Māori warrior crouched on rocks while holding a taiaha, the initially silver coin was released to generally critical public response. Issued in 50% silver until a postwar rise in silver prices triggered a shift to cupronickel in 1947, the coin was minted with relative consistency until 1965, when it was discontinued following decimalisation and the adoption of the New Zealand dollar.

== Background ==
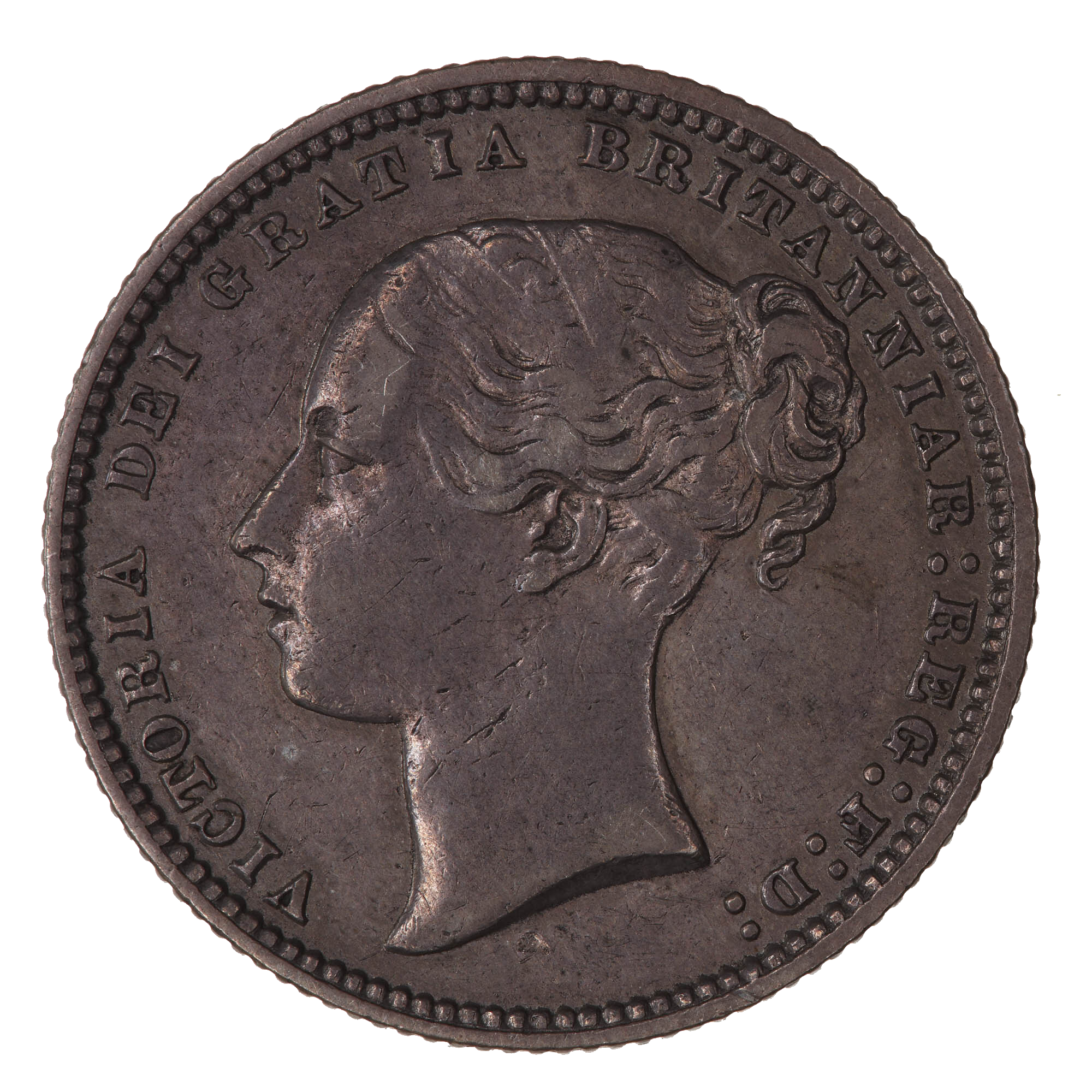
British shillings circulated in New Zealand during the 19th and early 20th centuries.

British shillings first circulated in New Zealand during the early 19th century alongside various other silver coinage, including American, Spanish, French, and Dutch issues alongside other British silver denominations. The British pound sterling was confirmed as legal tender in 1858, but had in effect been the sole circulating currency since 1847. Australia began issuing its own coinage in 1910, including the Australian shilling. Widespread circulation of the Australian silver coinage in New Zealand began in 1930, when Australia devalued the Australian pound relative to the pound sterling. Large amounts of the devalued Australian currency began to flood into New Zealand, eventually making up 30–40% of all coinage in circulation by early 1933. The counterfeiting of silver coins also increased during this period.

New Zealand followed in devaluing the New Zealand pound in 1933, triggering mass smuggling of silver coinage to Britain and its other colonial possessions. After several decades of proposals, the New Zealand government pursued the creation of a domestic coinage the same year. The Coinage Act, 1933, outlined the weights and sizes of the six denominations of New Zealand silver coinage, defining the shilling as a coin with a weight of 5.66 grams. The shilling was worth twelve pence or half a florin. Although domestic firms offered to produce the coinage, the New Zealand government deemed that domestic facilities were not sufficient for mass production, and contracted with the Royal Mint for minting.

== Design ==
All coinage obverses from the initial 1933 issue featured a crowned bust of George V designed by Royal Mint designer Percy Metcalfe, initially for use on the Southern Rhodesian pound. This was based on an older crowned bust by Australian sculptor Bertram Mackennal, used on the coinage of other British colonies and dominions. Reverse designs were a matter of collaboration between the Royal Mint Advisory Committee, headed by Deputy Master Robert Johnson, and the New Zealand government. Local artists and members of the New Zealand Numismatic Society were consulted throughout the design process, but British designers were tasked with creating an initial series of designs, despite requests from local art societies for domestic artistry of the coins. Metcalfe and George Kruger Gray were experienced artists who had each previously designed coinage for several other British dominions and colonies. The two were tasked to submit designs for each of the five initial silver denominations of coinage.

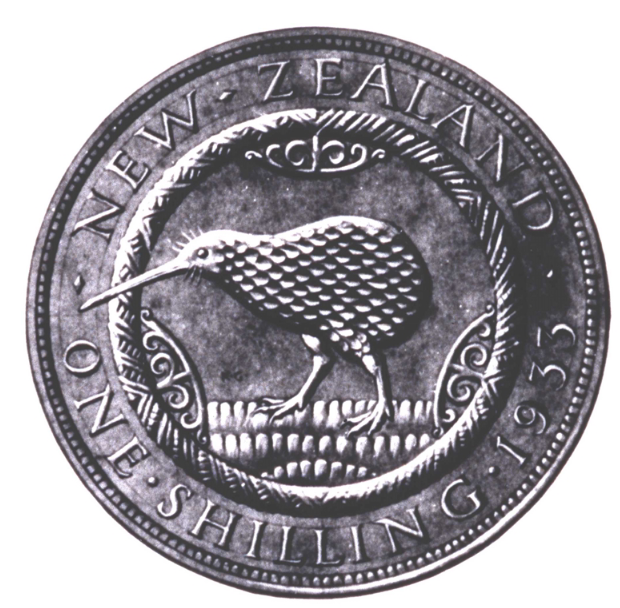
Kruger Gray's initial kiwi shilling design, 1933

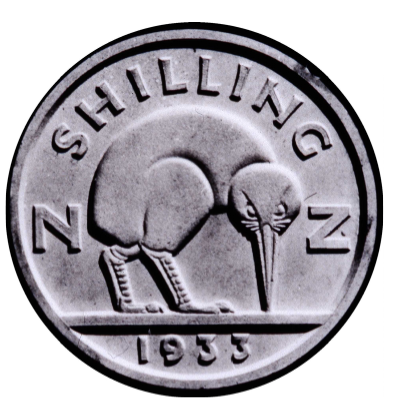
Metcalfe's kiwi shilling design, 1933

Metcalfe submitted two designs. His first featured a toki poutangata (A Māori ceremonial greenstone adze) crossed with a whakapakoko rākau (godstick), bisecting the text "SHILLING" and "NZ". Interrupting the text and juxtaposing two unrelated Māori implements, the design was swiftly rejected by the Mint Advisory Committee. Metcalfe would later submit a variation of this design for use on the penny, but it was also rejected.

Metcalfe's second design showed an abstracted kiwi facing towards the viewer and standing on flat ground, with the label of "SHILLING" above, "N" and "Z" at front and back of the bird, and the date below. The Advisory Committee rejected this design without comment. While this kiwi was described in a 1966 issue of the New Zealand Numismatic Journal as "hardly recognisable", a 2004 supplementary issue described it as an Art Deco design, "timeless, stylish and funky".

Kruger Gray's design, well-liked by the committee, also featured an abstract kiwi, with rippled divots across its body. Kowhaiwhai motifs flank the bird on three sides, along with a textured ground arcing beneath. Coinage Committee member and numismatic historian Allan Sutherland likened the kiwi design to a pine-cone, disapproving of the rendering: "The average New Zealander would not accept this as an accurate representation of the national wingless bird. This shilling was approved by the Royal Mint Advisory Committee, alongside other designs by Kruger Gray for the other initial denominations of the coinage.

=== Coinage Design Committee intervention ===
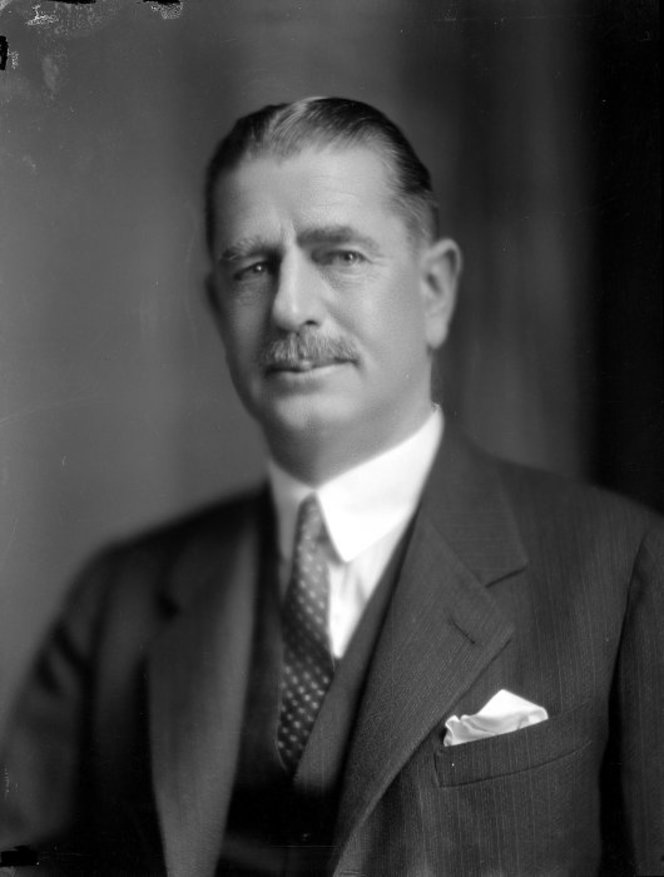
Coates in 1931

New Zealand's prime minister George Forbes held a very weak premiership, and finance minister Gordon Coates served as de facto acting prime minister, especially during Forbes' extended stays in Britain. In July 1933, Coates appointed a Coinage Design Committee, composed of various local artists alongside members of the New Zealand Numismatic Society. This new committee took significant issue with the approved coinage designs, rejecting the abstracted kiwi design in favour of a naturalistic design to be used on the larger florin reverse. With the florin proposed as a base unit of a future decimal coinage, the committee prioritised the kiwi's presence on the coin. The shilling, on advice from Minister of Native Affairs Sir Āpirana Ngata, was prescribed as a "Maori figure crouching alert with taiaha [...] design fairly filling circle, plain field." The Royal Mint was asked to reference Allan Gairdner Wyon's 1911 design for the Hector Memorial Medal, the obverse of which shows a Māori hunter snaring a huia. The request for a Māori figure to be added to the currency was supported by other Māori politicians such as Eruera Tirikatene, MP for the Southern Maori district.

Deputy Master Johnson attempted to contact Wyon to procure a medal for reference on the shilling. The two, business competitors in medal design, disliked each other. Wyon, suspecting that Johnson would attempt to copy his work, refused to loan a copy to the Royal Mint. Kruger Gray, also unable to reference the medal, was disappointed by the elimination of kowhaiwhai, considering it important to preserving a distinct national character for the New Zealand coinage. He considered the shilling as too small a coin for a full-body figure, recommending it instead be put on the florin. Several days after the request was brought to Kruger Gray, Johnson reassured him that the original designs would go forward, and he was asked to proceed with the shilling with slight modifications, including increased definition given to the nostrils of the bird. Johnson cited agreement from Prime Minister Forbes on the use of the kiwi shilling: "New Zealand Premier wishes to abide strictly by the decision [...] and proposes to disregard the observations of the local Committee."Alongside a threepence using a hei-tiki motif, this adjusted shilling was one of only two of the rejected designs to reach the production of pattern coins, with surviving examples held at the Royal Mint Museum, as well as one privately held example certified by PCGS.

The difficulty in adapting a design of this character, which is primarily a medal design, to a coin is that the amount required on the reverse to present the crouching figure adequately is so great that it cannot be taken up successfully with the single blow [...] since the effigy of His Majesty on the obverse side already requires a considerable mass of metal on the other side.

— Deputy Master Robert Johnson, letter to Allan Sutherland, October 13, 1933

While the Advisory Committee continued work on the coinage, citing the urgent need for domestic coinage and the delay any such redesign would cause, Coates continued to cable the Royal Mint with details for the redesign. The Advisory Committee aimed to stall until Forbes' return to New Zealand on 20 September, upon which Coates would lose acting ministerial powers and work could continue on the originally approved designs. Johnson drafted a telegram to be sent to Coates, proposing a redesign for the 1934 issue, while maintaining the Advisory Committee's designs for the 1933 coins, while reiterating objections on the suitability of a full body depiction of the Māori on a shilling-sized coin.

However, Forbes ultimately conceded to the Design Committee upon his return to New Zealand, alerting the Royal Mint in early October to continue with the proposed redesign. Kruger Gray's abstracted kiwi design was initially transferred to the florin directly, but he was ultimately forced to redesign it in a naturalistic fashion.

=== Māori shilling ===
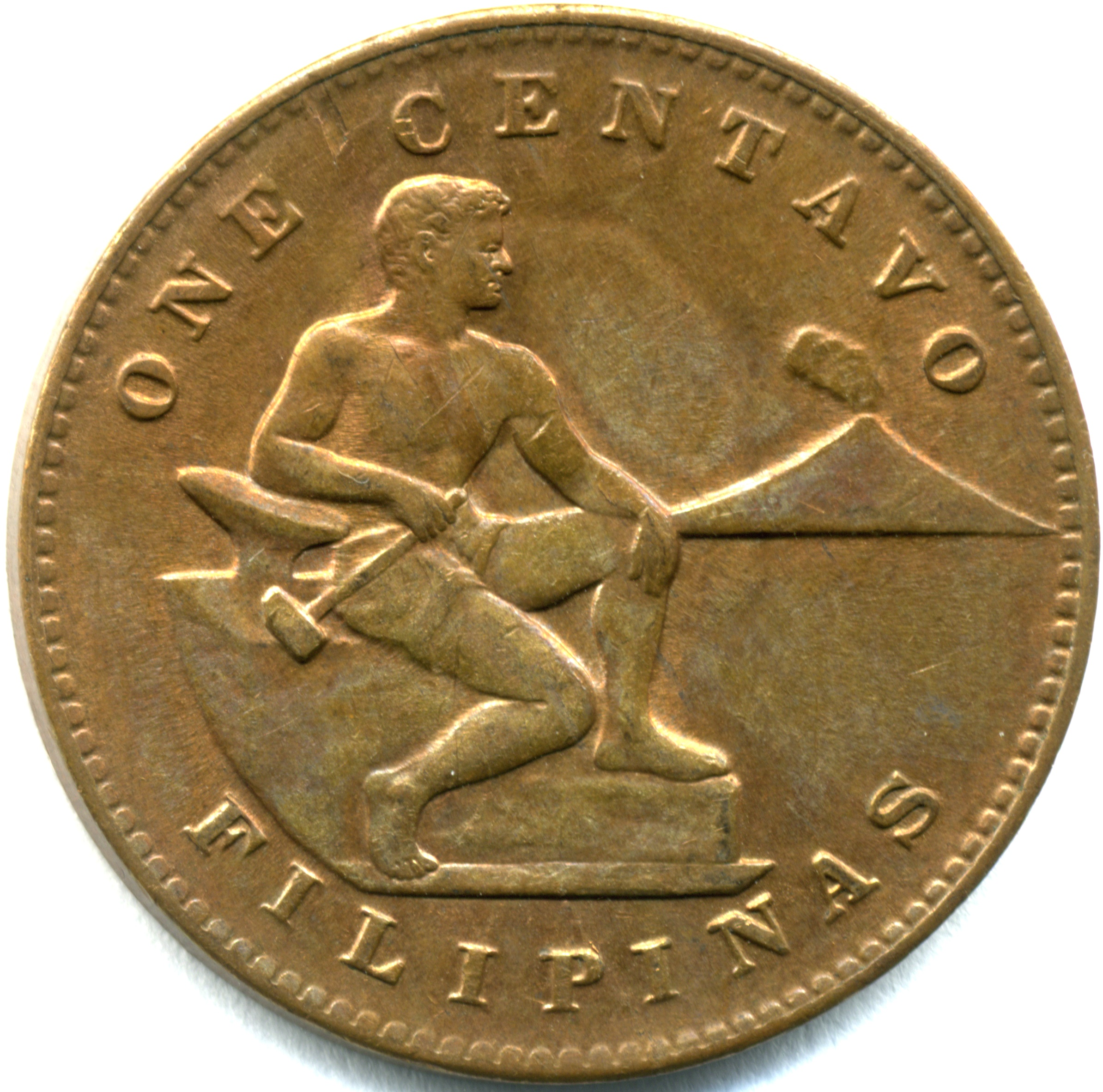
Philippines one centavo, under the American Insular Government

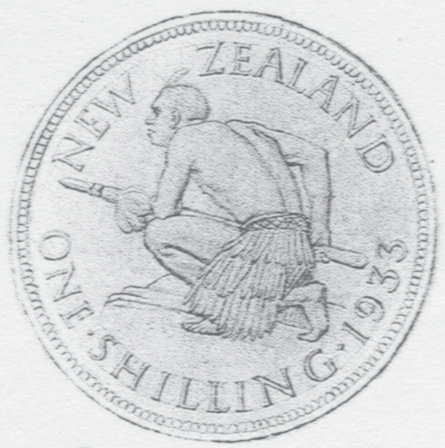
Kruger Gray's initial sketch of the redesigned shilling

Coates specified that the Māori figure on the shilling should be depicted in "proper war dance [Haka] attitude", and advised reference to the contemporary Philippine one centavo; he was "unable to understand" Johnson's objections to the design's scale on the shilling, and sketches were sent to assist. A request by MP Eruera Tirikatene for the figure to be tattooed was dismissed by Coates, who believed it would present New Zealanders as "savage Maoris".

Kruger Gray rapidly progressed with the new design instructions, submitting by mid-October a sketch approximating the final design. Instead of a haka, the warrior is shown in a piupiu, shirtless and turned away from the viewer, crouched atop a rock or escarpment. He holds a taiaha in both his hands, pointing forward. By November, the design had been approved and Kruger Gray was asked to proceed with modelling the shilling for production. They were the last of the 1933 issue to reach New Zealand, entering circulation at Dunedin on 3 April 1934. Johnson's concerns about the force required to depict the high relief figure turned prescient, as harder blows led to much shorter lifespans for the individual dies while minting the shilling.

Is it too late to cancel the issue and have a correctly clad Maori warrior with taiaha in proper position remodelled for the new shilling? One would like to feel if it was only a bob [shilling] he had in his pocket, and that's a lot these hard times, that it was quite "tika".

— Letter to the editor, New Zealand Herald, March 1934

== Reception ==
While the new coinage was welcomed by the New Zealand public, reaction to the shilling was mixed. The ahistorical usage of the piupiu garment (associated with modern Haka dance and ceremony) in a combat scenario was criticised, alongside the awkward pose with which the taiaha was held. Allan Sutherland was pleased with the design, but regretted an "absence of youth, vigour and vitality" in the warrior's depiction. The shilling was criticised in Dominion by ethnologist Johannes Andersen as overly warlike. He suggested that a frontal view, or a design more akin to the hunting scene depicted in the Hector Medal, would be more appropriate.

== Mintage ==
Mintage of the shilling stayed relatively stable across its lifespan, with only five years where no circulating pieces were produced. However, low mintage figures in the early 1940s and 1950s lead to significantly scarcity of uncirculated coins of some dates, with some, such as the 1955 shilling, worth hundreds of dollars at market in mint condition. No commemorative issues were produced.

Two significant error varieties of the shilling exist, commanding significantly higher prices than the standard issues of their dates. Shillings of the "broken back" variety were minted in small quantities in 1942 and 1958. A "no horizon" variety appeared in the 1962 issue. Due to high prices of silver in the years following World War II, previously silver denominations (including the shilling) were instead made of a cupronickel alloy from 1947, besides a crown issue in 1949. Much silver coinage was recalled from circulation and melted down by banks. The shilling was abolished in 1967 in favour of the new denominations of the New Zealand dollar.

George V Mintage
Year	1933	1934	1935	1936
Mintage	2,000,000	3,400,000	1,680,000	0

George VI Mintage
Year	1937	1938	1939	1940	1941	1942	1943	1944	1945	1946	1947	1948	1949	1950	1951	1952
Mintage	890,000	0	0	500,000	360,000	240,000	900,000	480,000	1,030,000	1,060,000	2,800,000	1,000,000	0	600,000	1,200,000	600,000

Elizabeth II Mintage
Year	1953	1954	1955	1956	1957	1958	1959	1960	1961	1962	1963	1964	1965
Mintage	200,000	0	200,000	800,000	800,000	1,000,000	600,000	600,000	400,000	1,000,000	600,000	3,400,000	3,500,000
