= Waitangi crown =

New Zealand commemorative coin

- New Zealand
- Value: 5/— (5 shillings, or ¼ £NZ)
- Mass: 28.27 g
- Diameter: 38.61 mm
- Edge: Milled
- Shape: Round
- Composition: 50% Ag
- Years of minting: 1935
- Mintage: 1,128 (including 468 proofs)

Obverse
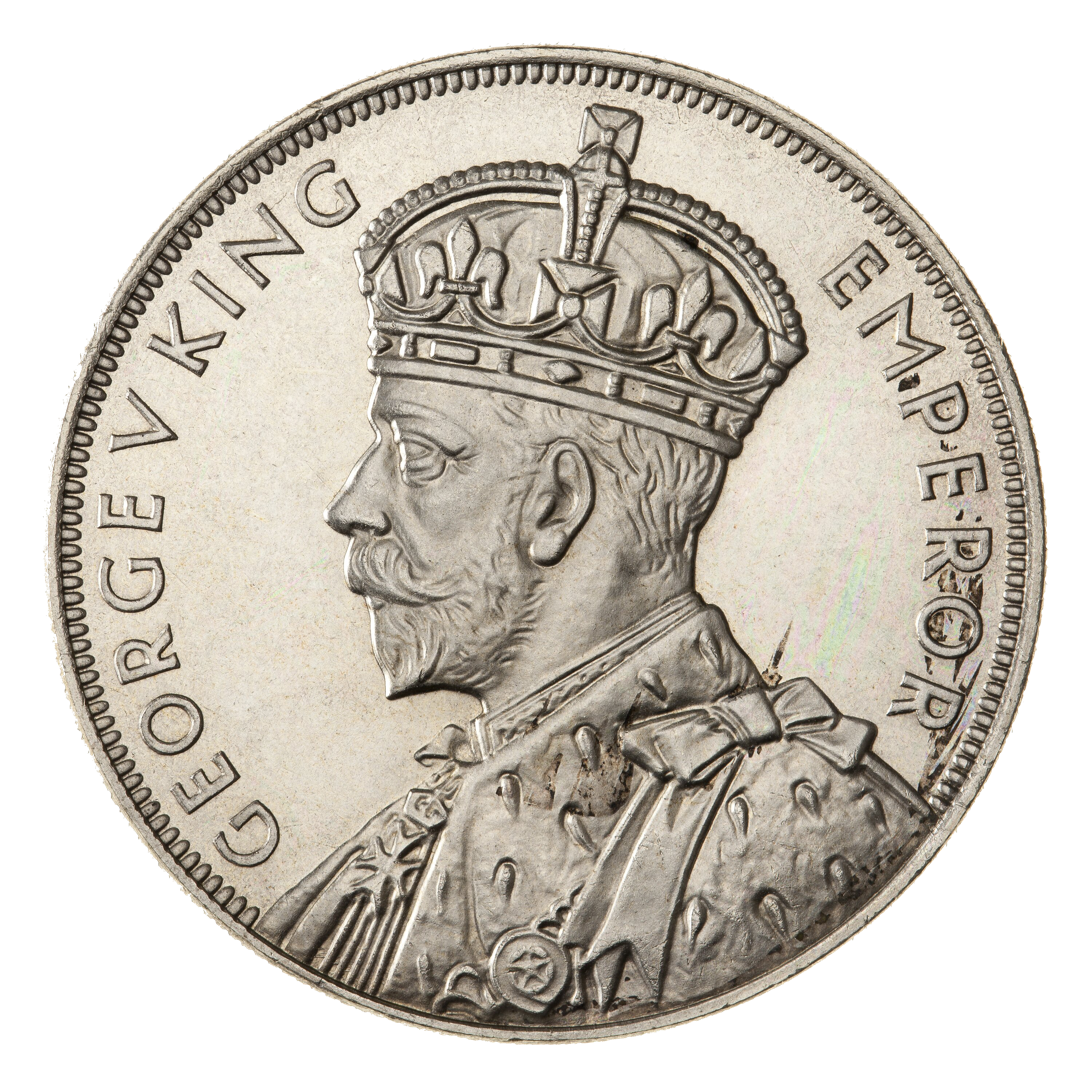
- Design: Crowned bust of George V
- Designer: Percy Metcalfe

Reverse
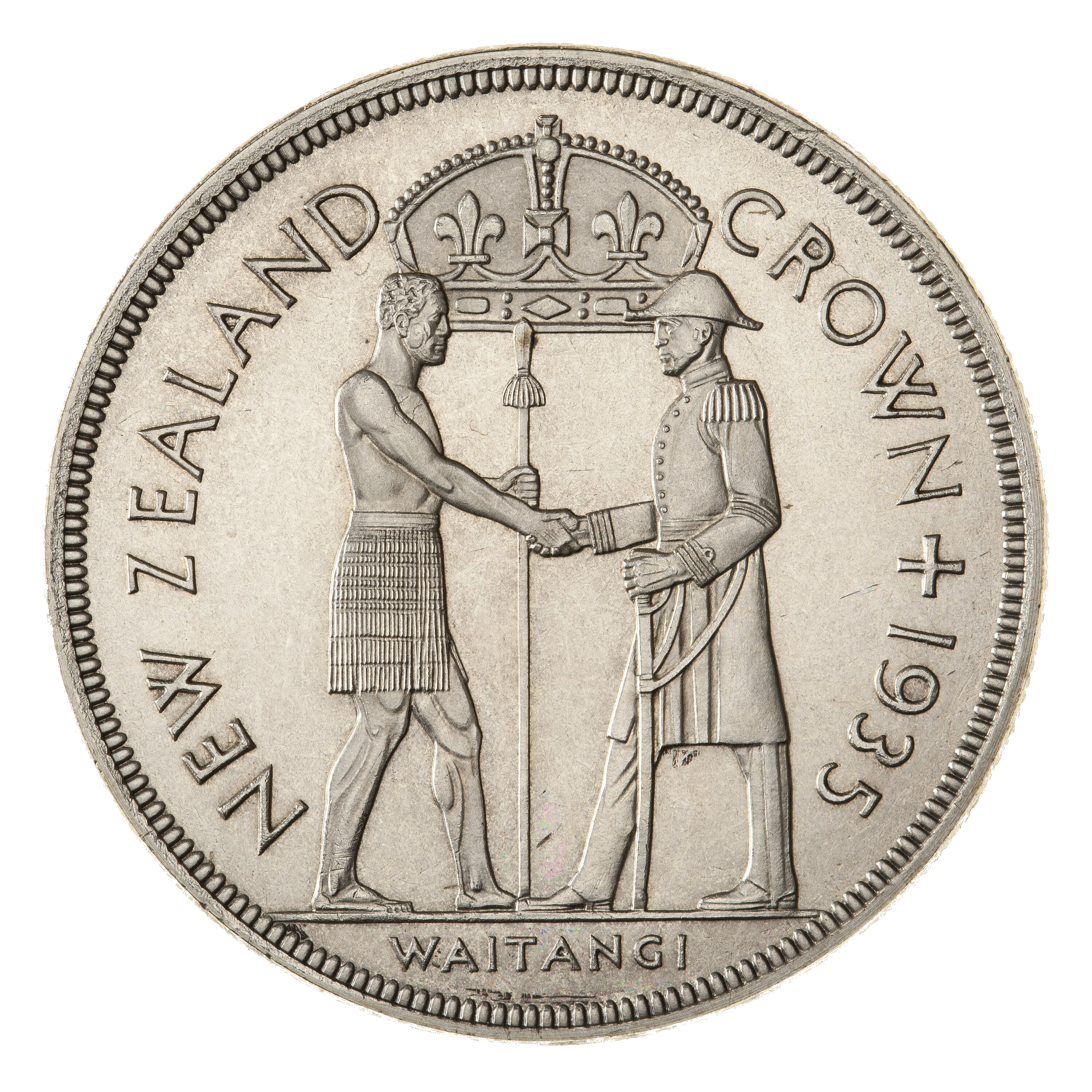
- Design: Handshake between Tāmati Wāka Nene and William Hobson
- Designer: Percy Metcalfe

The Waitangi crown is a commemorative crown coin struck in 1935 by the British Royal Mint for the Dominion of New Zealand to commemorate the 1840 signing of the Treaty of Waitangi, often seen as New Zealand's founding constitutional document. It was the first five-shilling piece minted of the New Zealand pound and the nation's first coin minted primarily for collectors. Following the rejection of designs by James Berry and George Kruger Gray, Royal Mint designer Percy Metcalfe (who had also designed the bust of George V on the coin's obverse) was commissioned to design the reverse. Design disagreements plagued the production of the crown, and only an extremely small mintage of 1,128 (including 468 proofs) was struck and distributed to collectors. Released to muted media coverage and a general lack of interest in coin collecting during the economic aftermath of the Great Depression, the coin has become heavily sought by collectors of New Zealand coinage. Regularly selling for thousands of dollars, one pattern issue of the coin auctioned at over $70,000 USD, becoming the most expensive New Zealand coin ever sold.

== Background ==
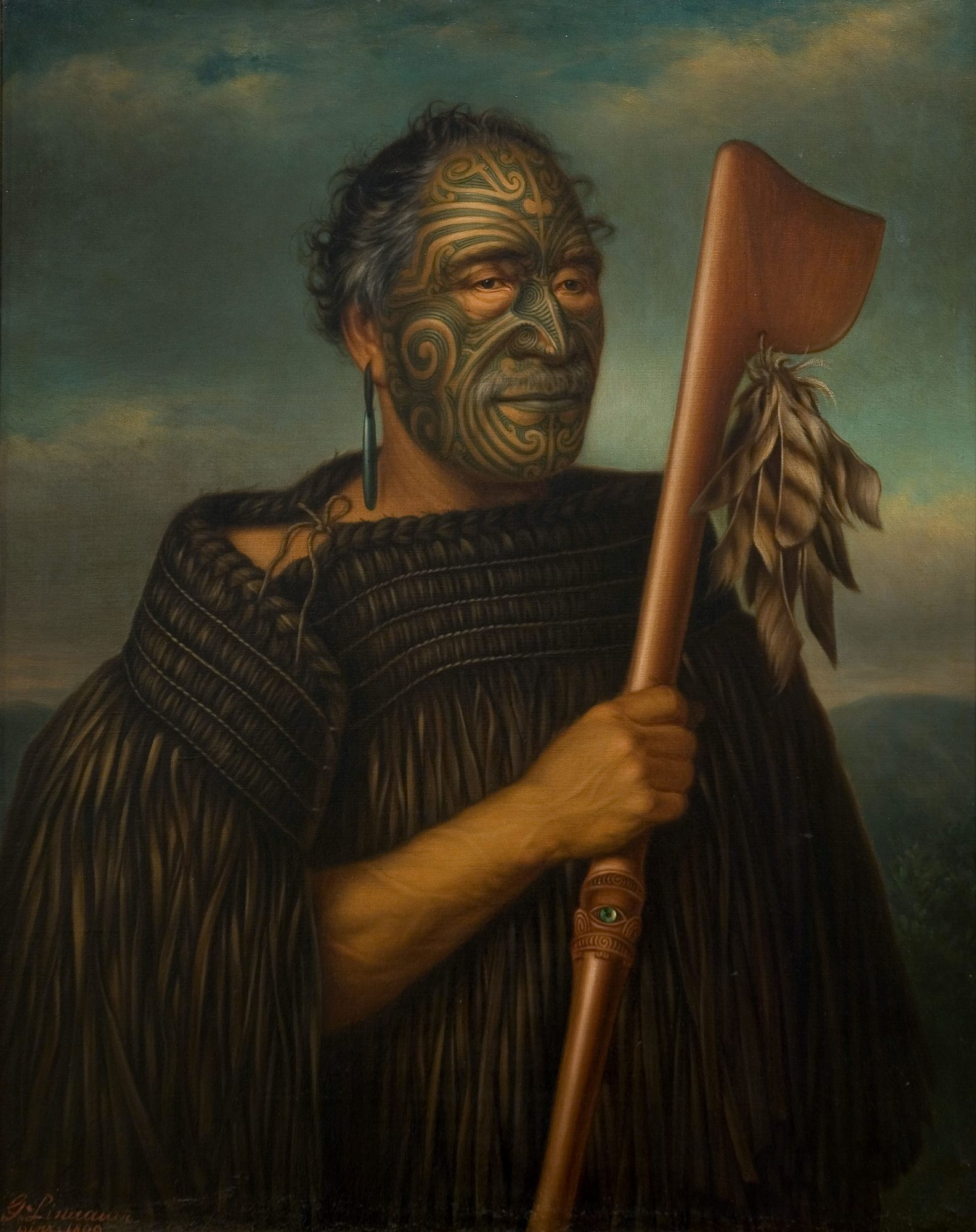
Chief Tāmati Wāka Nene, signatory of the Treaty of Waitangi

The Treaty of Waitangi is an 1840 treaty signed at the Bay of Islands between various Māori chiefs and British representative William Hobson. Succeeding New Zealand's earlier Declaration of Independence, the treaty established the sovereignty of the Crown over New Zealand as a portion of New South Wales alongside the recognition of autonomy and certain land rights for Māori. The treaty, although not directly enforceable, would become a constitutional document for New Zealand and the relationship between Māori and Pākehā.

While various foreign silver coinage was used in its initial period of colonisation, British silver coins became dominant following the confirmation of the pound sterling as the sole legal tender in 1858, alongside various locally issued copper tokens. Although never a legal tender, the introduction of the Australian pound led to the occasional circulation of Australian coinage, accelerated by the Great Depression. By 1931, an estimated 30%-40% of circulating coins in New Zealand were Australian. The devaluation of the New Zealand pound relative to the pound sterling led to mass currency smuggling and coin shortages. The Coinage Act, 1933, allowed the issue of independent coinage of the New Zealand pound. The act set out weight and purity specifications for six denominations of silver coinage, requiring all coinage to be produced at 50% silver by weight. Although the crown was among the denominations listed in the act, the Royal Mint minted only the five smaller denominations for 1933 and 1934. No design was proposed for a crown denomination during the initial selection process. Any future crown issue were defined as a coin with a diameter of 1.525 inches, and a weight of 28.27 grams. Like other New Zealand silver coinage, the rim of the coin was milled.

All obverse designs in the series used a crowned bust portrait of George V initially designed by Percy Metcalfe for use on the Southern Rhodesian pound. This new portrait was adapted from an older portrait designed by Bertram Mackennal, featured on other British colonial coinage.

== Inception ==
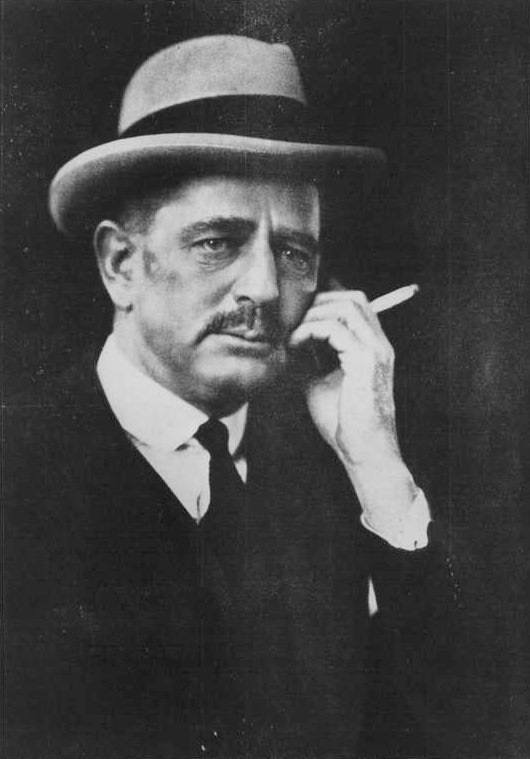
Finance Minister Gordon Coates oversaw New Zealand's coinage design over the 1930s.

The New Zealand Numismatic Society served a significant role in the designs of the 1933 coinage series, with several members of the society placed on the Coinage Committee organised by Gordon Coates, organised to wrestle control over the designs from the Royal Mint Advisory Committee and Deputy Master Robert Johnson. Royal Mint artist George Kruger Gray worked off Coinage Committee proposals during the later stages of the design process. Allan Sutherland, honorary secretary of the Society and its representative to the Coinage Committee, first proposed a commemorative crown issue to Secretary to the Treasury Alexander Dallas Park in October 1933, during the final stages of the production of the initial issue of coinage. Sutherland cited precedence in the commemorative crown issues of the British pound alongside potential government profit. He proposed a mintage of at least 10,000 collectors' sets (through which the coin would be exclusively available), due to increased collector demand for a newly introduced coinage such as the New Zealand pound.

The government was receptive to the proposal, and informed the Numismatic Society in January 1934, of their intention to produce such a coin to commemorate the Treaty of Waitangi. Allan Sutherland and Society president John Rankine Brown disapproved of the choice of subject matter, believing the upcoming 1940 centenary of the treaty more appropriate for such commemoration. Finance Minister Gordon Coates publicly announced the coin in the Auckland Star on February 7, following the first official Waitangi Day celebrations. This announcement described an earlier version of the design, featuring several missionaries (including Reverend Henry Williams) alongside Nene and Hobson. Incorrectly stating it was to be designed by Kruger Gray, local artist James Berry had been commissioned to create the initial design.

== Design ==
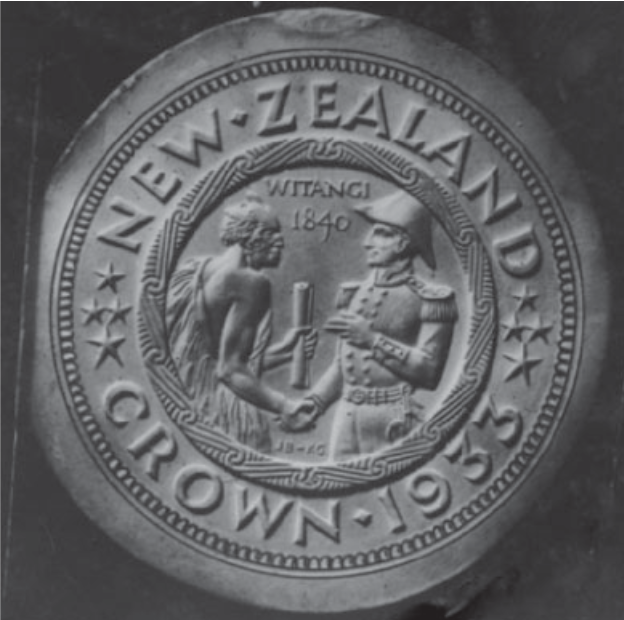
Model by Kruger Gray off a sketch by Berry, featuring the misspelling "Witangi"

Berry's sketches were commissioned as blueprints for designers at the Royal Mint to work upon. A bas-relief on the base of the Wellington Queen Victoria monument, later featured on the reverse of the ten-shilling banknote, was used as inspiration for one of the designs, with Sutherland suggesting this would allow for the display of a number of figures without overcrowding the design. Another design by Berry was later modeled in plaster by Kruger Gray, showing a handshake between Hobson and Wāka Nene, with a misspelled "‘Witangi" above the motif. These designs were disliked by the Royal Mint and dismissed.

On recommendation by Sir Goscombe John, Percy Metcalfe was eventually tasked to model the coin. Metcalfe had previously designed a series of rejected models for the 1933 issue. In July 1934, six weeks after Berry's design was rejected, Metcalfe presented photographs of another model to a receptive Royal Mint. This design was possibly inspired by James Berry's work, who had previously mentioned an alternate design featuring the two figures standing beneath a crown. Another inspiration was a relief by 18th-century British sculptor John Flaxman, Mercury Uniting the Hands of Britain and France. The design featured a cloaked Wāka Nene, wearing and holding a taiaha, shaking hands with William Hobson beneath a royal crown. Unlike later designs, Nene lacks facial tattoos in the initial model. Metcalfe and Robert Johnson were relatively unfamiliar with the source material. Johnson was initially unaware if Captain Hobson should be depicted as bearded or clean-shaven. Despite production timelines stretching into late 1934, the model was dated 1933 in line with the other coins of the initial series.

Some small suggestions, mainly regarding Hobson's uniform, were offered to Metcalfe by the Royal Mint, but work on the design was halted by Gordon Coates in early September 1934. In November, Coates alerted the Royal Mint of issues taken with the modelling of Nene's limbs and clothing. He requested the refinement of the chief's limbs into a less rigid position, regarding them as rigid and poorly-shaped; he additionally suggested that the crown motif be shrunk down and that Nene's cloak be replaced with a topless outfit featuring a piupiu. Coates described the figures' faces as "neither [...] bear any resemblance to personalities intended to be depicted."

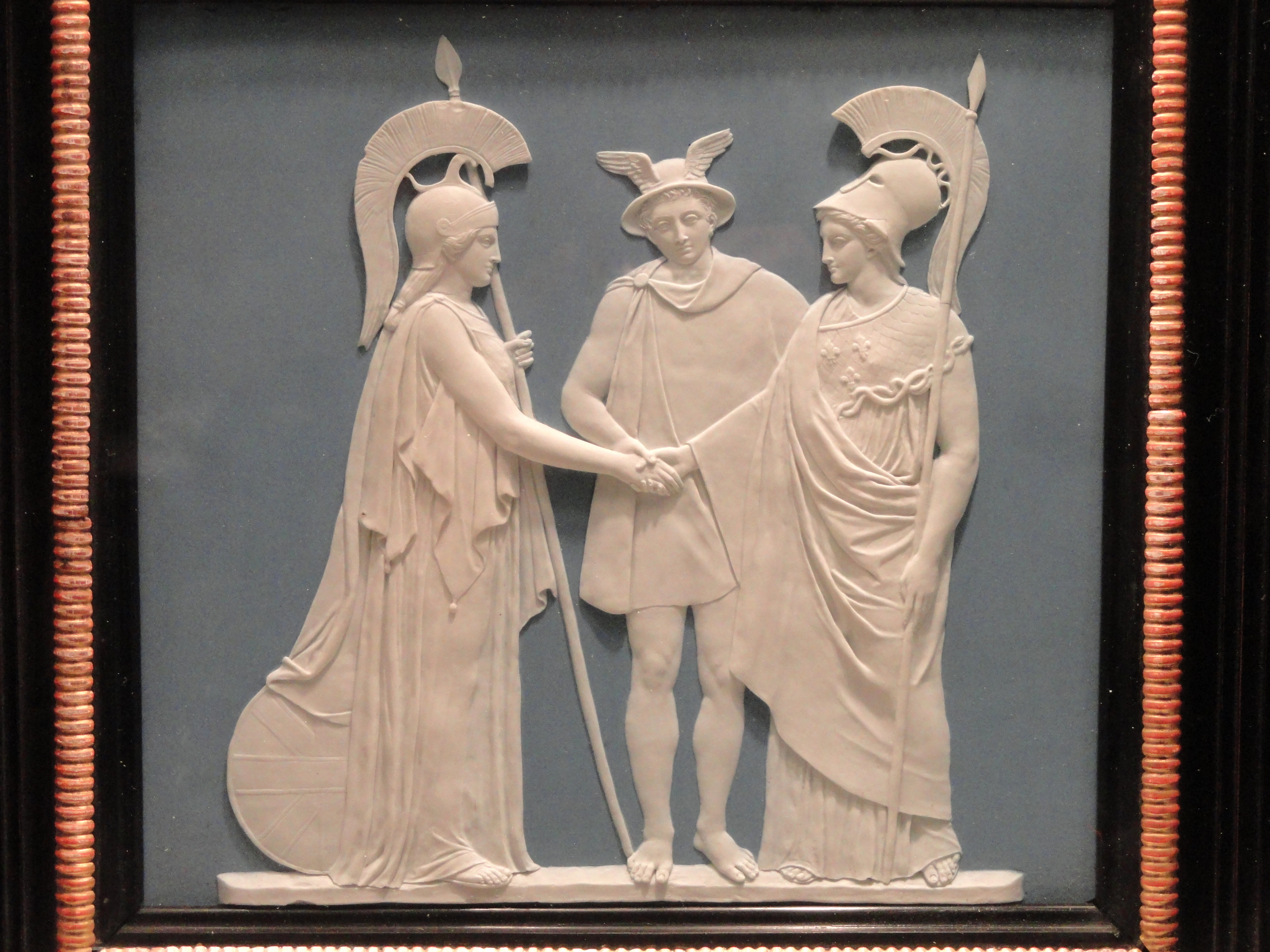
A relief by John Flaxman inspired the posing of the Waitangi crown

Unaware of Coates' issues with the coin, Metcalfe continued work on the design. His second model, dated 1934, resolved several of the issues, replacing Nene's cloak with the piupiu, refining his limbs, and adjusting the rendering of Hobson's trousers. Later alerted of Coates' proposals, Metcalfe was frustrated, stating that he would only decrease the size of the crown if forced to. On November 28, Coates sent a second telegram, describing Nene's limbs and hands as un-Māori. A frustrated Robert Johnson replied to another member of the Coinage Committee "I have no idea […] in what way the limbs and size of Maori hands differ from those of ordinary human beings."

Metcalfe, being scheduled to visit Iraq to model King Ghazi's image for local coinage, hurried over the following few weeks a remodel of the coin. Conceding to Coates' demand for a smaller crown, he further altered Nene's limbs and garb. This redesign was well-received by the New Zealand-based committee, and by May 1935 pattern strikes of the coins were produced. Coates reviewed the coinage but was still disappointed by the figures' legs and requested revisions. In July 1935, Metcalfe completed the final revision of the coin, which was approved by Coates. Chief Nene's piupiu was raised to end at his knees, his legs were remodeled, and the crown was increased in size as a compromise between earlier revisions. Metcalfe, visiting the Mint production line in August 1935, expressed dislike of the final design. The crown, like the later Centennial half-crown, was struck on silver sourced from the Martha Mine in Waihi.

== Release ==
The Waitangi crown was released to collectors in three formats: as an uncirculated coin, as a proof coin, and as part of a proof set of all 1935 coinage. In total, 1,128 crowns were produced, including 468 proofs. While the majority were exported to New Zealand, the New Zealand High Commission sold some to collectors in London. The first order of single crown pieces was shipped to New Zealand within unsecured mint bags, resulting in scratching and bag marks on many of the coins. Complaints by the High Commission were dismissed by the Royal Mint, claiming that they had not been informed the crowns were intended for collectors.

I was astounded to find the Crowns were made up in Parcels of 20 pieces without even a piece of paper in-between each Coin to keep them from rubbing together.. These coins were made especially for collectors’ use and were proofed for that purpose and an extra charge of 50% was made. I have gone carefully through the 200 I have and cannot find one piece an advanced collector would with pleasure put into his cabinet.

— H.G. Williams, proprietor of the New Zealand Coin Exchange, in a letter to Treasury Secretary A.D. Park, February 7th, 1936

The crowns were sold for seven shillings and six pence in New Zealand. Proof sets were sold for eighteen shillings and six pence in cardboard boxes, or for twenty-five shillings in leather cases. Such prices were high during the waning years of the Great Depression, and numismatics remained a relatively niche hobby in New Zealand during the period. Only a single newspaper article mentioned the coin's release. There was a general apathy and lack of public interest towards the coin, contrasting much greater public demand in 1940 during the release of the Centennial half-crown.

== Legacy ==
Demand and pricing for the Waitangi crown slowly rose in the decades following the coin's release. By 1960, an example was estimated to be worth only NZ£30, although this was predicted to rise in the future. The coins regularly sell for thousands of dollars, greatly increasing in uncirculated condition. A Waitangi pattern featuring the smaller crown design, graded MS64 by NGC, sold for US$72,000 in a 2021 Heritage auction, becoming the most expensive New Zealand coin. The other known example of this pattern design is held by the Reserve Bank of New Zealand.
