= Crown (New Zealand coin) =

New Zealand pre-decimal commemorative coin

One crown
- New Zealand (1935–1967)
- Value: 5/- (5 shillings)
- Mass: 28.28 g (1 oz)
- Diameter: 38.74 mm (1.525 in)
- Thickness: 2 mm
- Edge: Milled
- Composition: (1935, 1949) 50% Ag; (1953) Cupronickel
- Years of minting: 1935, 1949, 1953

Obverse
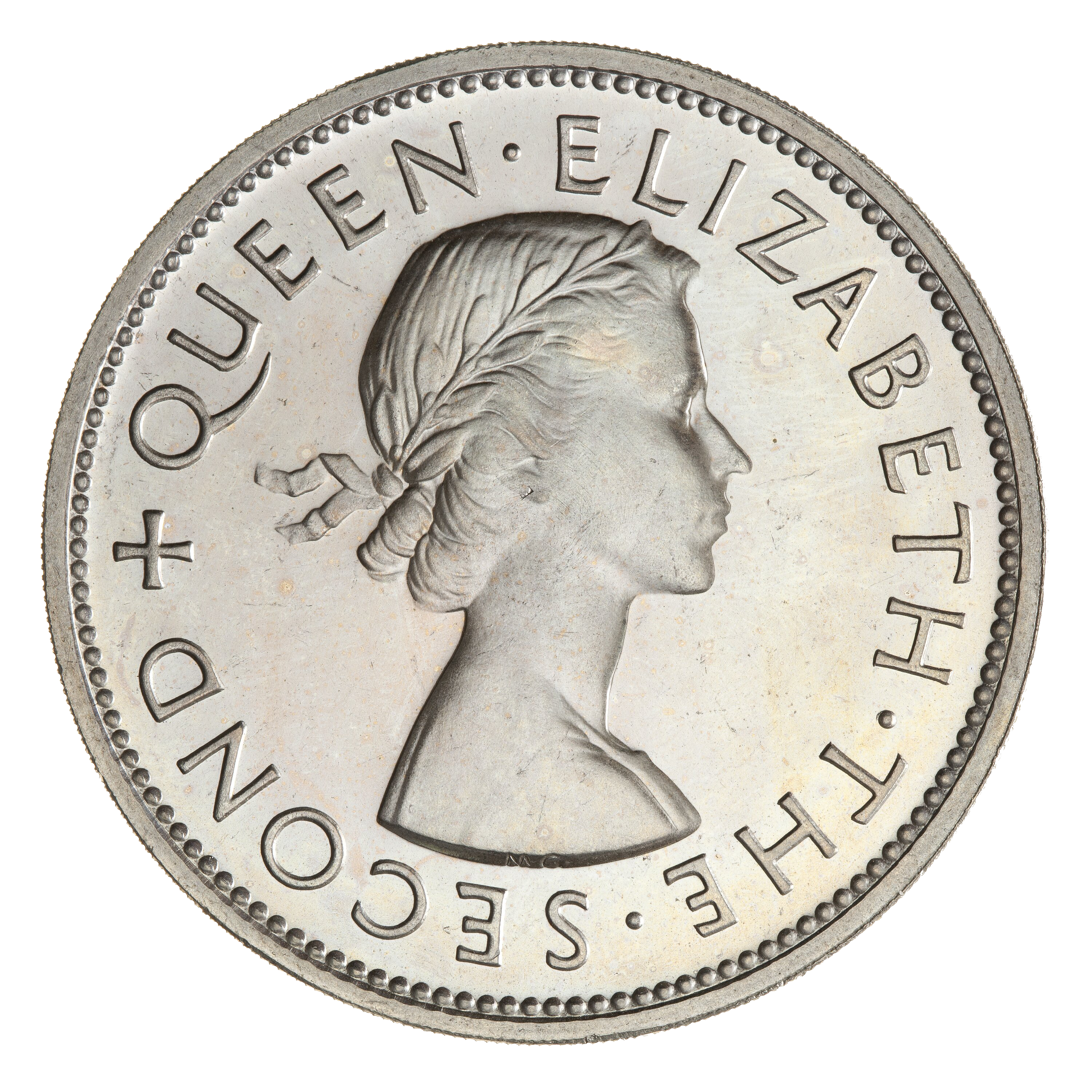
- Design: Profile of the British monarch (Elizabeth II design shown)

Reverse
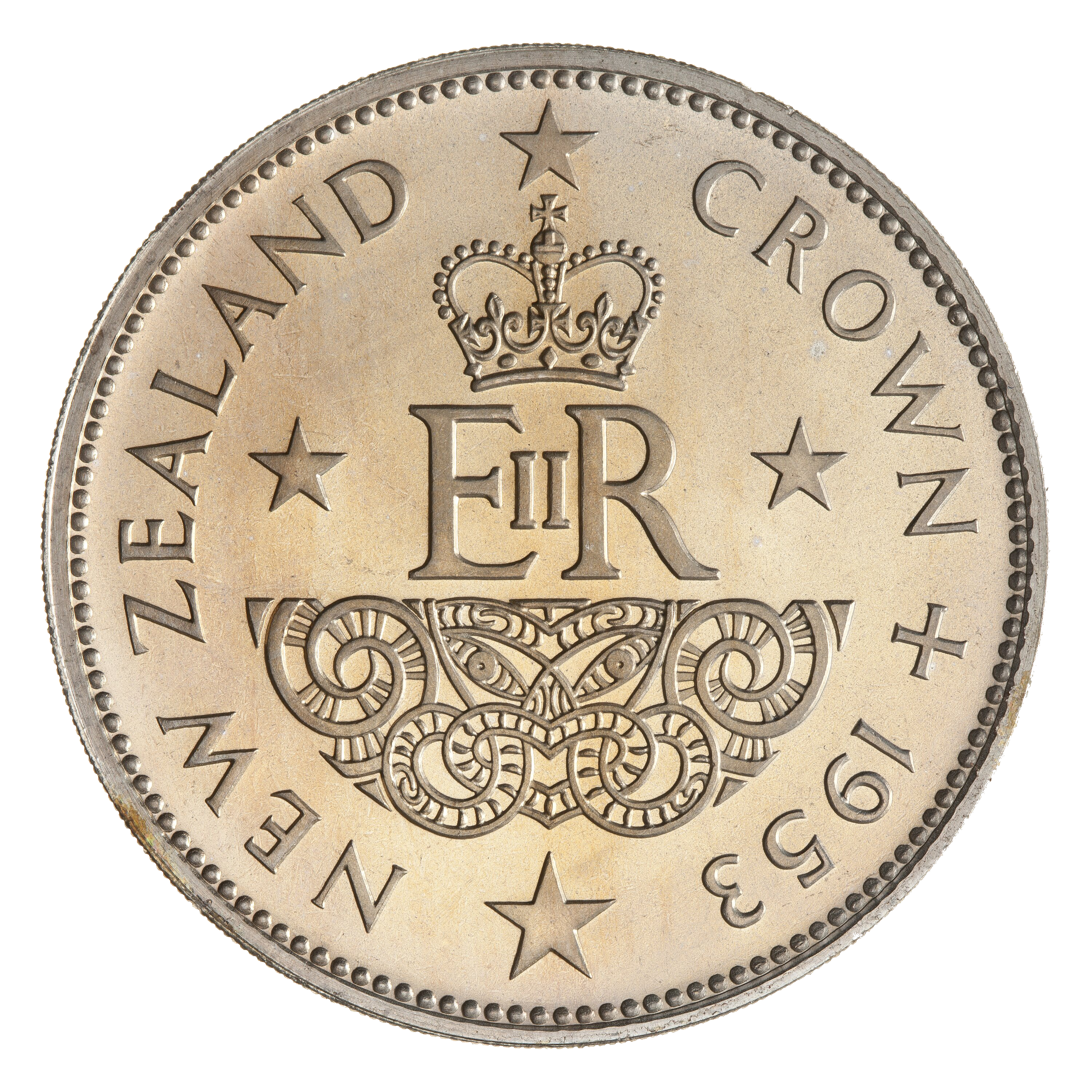
- Design: Various (1953 Coronation design shown)
- Designer: James Berry, Robert M. Conly, Percy Metcalfe

The crown was a large coin denomination worth a quarter of one New Zealand pound (five shillings, or 60 pence). New Zealand crowns were issued three times, in the same size and weight as the British crown, already in use in New Zealand at the time. The 1935 and 1949 crowns were struck in 1 ounce (28.3 grams) of 0.500 silver, and the 1953 Coronation crown was struck in cupronickel.

== History ==
Before and during the establishment of the Colony of New Zealand in the 1840s, Spanish silver coins formed the bulk of currency in circulation, alongside coinage from the United States, Portugal, France, and the Netherlands. British silver coins became dominant following the confirmation of the pound sterling as the sole legal tender, enacted with the 1858 English Laws Act.

Increased circulation in New Zealand of the Australian pound, especially during the Great Depression, and the devaluation of the New Zealand pound led to mass currency smuggling and coin shortages. The Coinage Act was introduced in 1933 to address these problems and allow the issue of independent coinage of the New Zealand pound.

Allan Sutherland of the New Zealand Numismatic Society first proposed a commemorative crown issue to the Secretary to the Treasury in 1933, during the final stages of the production of the initial issue of New Zealand pound coinage. Sutherland cited precedence in the commemorative crown issues of the British pound, alongside potential government profit. After some deliberation around the reverse design, the 1935 Waitangi crown commemorating the Treaty of Waitangi was produced in only limited quantities. Only 1128 were minted, sold mainly to collectors. While public interest was low at the time of issue, their rarity means Waitangi crowns, especially in uncirculated condition, sell for high prices at auction.

Later crowns were produced in larger quantities intended for circulation. A total of 200,020 crowns were produced in 1949 in anticipation of a Royal visit to New Zealand of George VI, which was abandoned due to ill health. A further 257,000 crowns were minted in 1953, commemorating the coronation of Elizabeth II.

Commemorative crown coins of the New Zealand pound
Image		Name	Value	Technical parameters			Edge	Description	Designer	Mintage	Date of issue
Obverse	Reverse	Name	Value	Diameter	Mass	Composition	Edge	Description	Designer	Mintage	Date of issue
		Waitangi crown	5s	38.74 mm; (1.525 inches)	28.28 g; (1 ounce)	50% silver, 37.5% copper, 12.5% nickel	milled	Tāmati Wāka Nene, with taiaha and wearing a piupiu, shaking hands with William Hobson	James Berry, Percy Metcalfe	1,128	1935
		Royal visit crown	5s	38.74 mm; (1.525 inches)	28.28 g; (1 ounce)	50% silver, 37.5% copper, 12.5% nickel	milled	A fern leaf frond surrounded by the four stars of the Southern Cross.	James Berry	200,020	1949
		Coronation crown	5s	38.74 mm; (1.525 inches)	28.28 g; (1 ounce)	75% copper, 25% nickel	milled	Initials EiiR of Elizabeth II with Royal Crown, whakairo carving, stars of the Southern Cross	Robert M. Conly	257,000	1953
These images are to scale at 2.5 pixels per millimetre. For table standards, see the coin specification table.

== Decimalisation ==
New Zealand decimalised the national currency in 1967, introducing the New Zealand dollar at two dollars to the pound, and abolishing former pound denominations. The crown's value of five shillings was nominally replaced by the 50 cent coin, which adopted the smaller size and weight of the half-crown.

== Mintage ==
New Zealand crown mintage
Year	Monarch	Number minted	Composition
1935	George V	1,128	0.500 Silver
1949	George VI	200,020	0.500 Silver
1953	Elizabeth II	257,000	Cupronickel
