= Royal Numismatic Society of New Zealand =

New Zealand numismatics non-profit organisation

The Royal Numismatic Society of New Zealand
- Formation: 20 July 1931
- Headquarters: Wellington, New Zealand
- Patron: Dame Cindy Kiro, GNZM QSO DStJ
- President: David Galt FRNSNZ
- Website: www.rnsnz.org.nz

The Royal Numismatic Society of New Zealand (known as the New Zealand Numismatic Society until 1947) is a nonprofit group founded in 1931 which seeks to "encourage and promote the study of numismatics and other related historical subjects."

It is based in Wellington, New Zealand, where it holds regular meetings open to guests.

== History ==
The New Zealand Numismatic Society was founded in 1931, and the Governor-General of New Zealand has been a patron since then. On 18 October 2020, Dame Patsy Reddy opened the Society's conference in Wellington.

== Publications ==
- New Zealand Numismatic Journal, annually
- A newsletter, two or three times a year

== Library ==
The Royal Numismatic Society maintains a library of numismatic books, which can be accessed by its members by mail.

== Fellows ==
Fellow of the Royal Numismatic Society of New Zealand (FRNSNZ) is a title bestowed upon members as the highest honour that can be conferred by the Royal Numismatic Society of New Zealand. It is awarded for loyal and long service to the Royal Numismatic Society.

Fellows are entitled to use these post-nominal letters as long as they are members of the Society. Non-members who have distinguished themselves in the field of numismatics can be awarded the title "FRNSNZ (Hon.)", which is held for life.

== Presidents ==
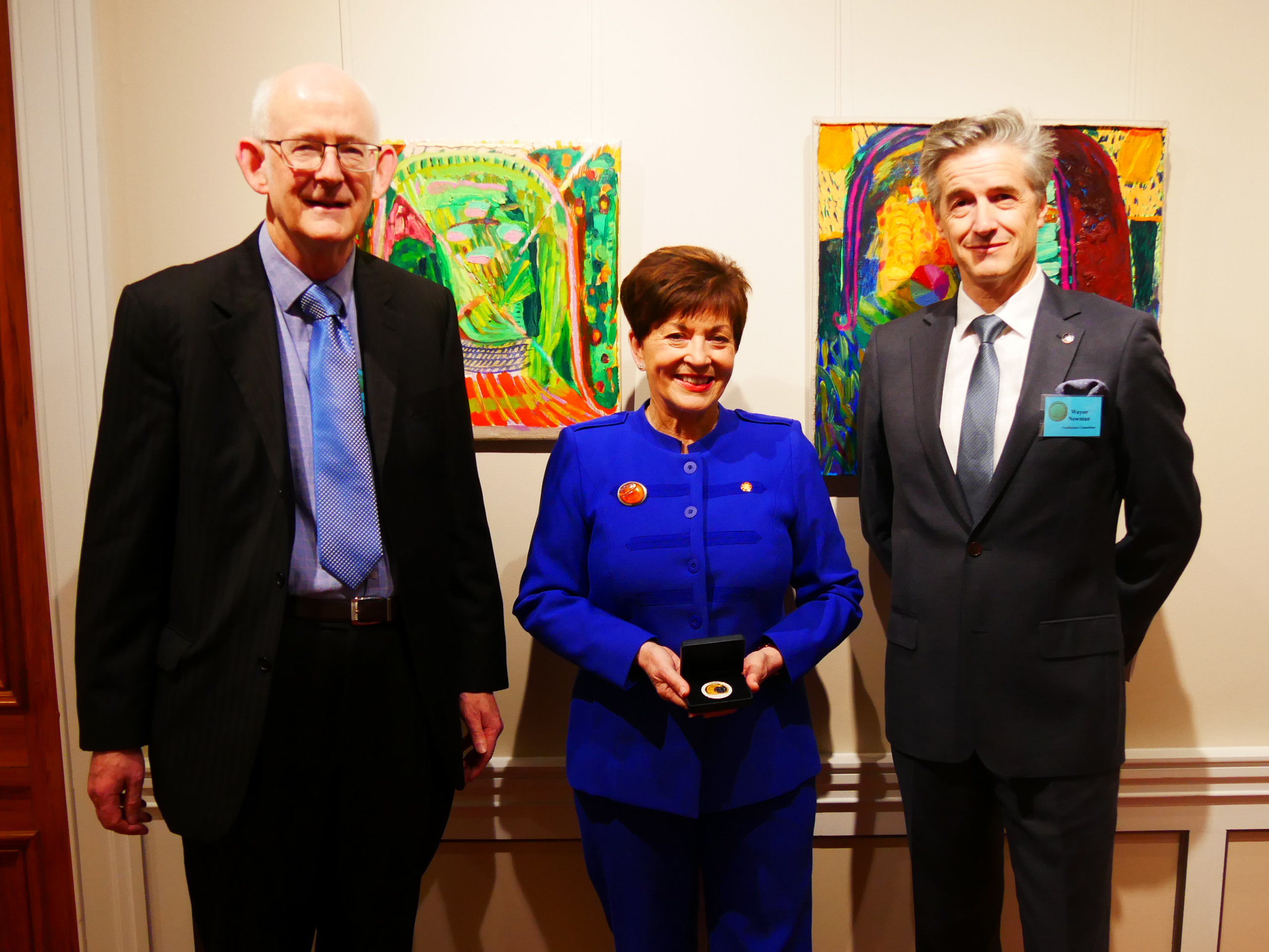
Dame Patsy Reddy Royal Numismatic Society of New Zealand President David Galt and Secretary Wayne Newman in October 2020.

The following is a list of the presidents of the Royal Numismatic Society of New Zealand showing years elected:

- 1931–32: Col. Rev. D. C. Bates
- 1933–35: Prof. J. Rankine Brown
- 1936–38: Sir James Elliott
- 1939–45: Mr Johannes C. Andersen
- 1946–48: Mr Allan Sutherland
- 1949: Mr William D. Ferguson
- 1950–51: Mr Maxwell H. Hornblow
- 1952–55: Prof. H. A. Murray
- 1956–60: Capt. G. T. Stagg
- 1961: Mr James Berry
- 1962–63: Mr L. J. Dale
- 1964–67: Mr B. G. Hamlin
- 1968–69: Mr N. R. A. Netherclift
- 1969: Capt. G.T. Stagg
- 1970: Mr J. R. Graydon
- 1971: Mr A. F. Robb
- 1972: Mr A. J. Freed
- 1973–79: Mrs I. Ranger
- 1980–86: Mr W. H. Lampard
- 1987–88: Mr R. T. Harwood
- 1989–2003: Mr W. H. Lampard
- 2003–06: Mr M. L. Purdy
- 2006–present: Mr David A. Galt
