= Heliopolis War Cemetery =

Commonwealth War Cemetery in Egypt

Coordinates: 30.0787°N 31.3294°E

Heliopolis War Cemetery, which includes two relocated memorials - the Heliopolis (Port Tewfik) Memorial and the Heliopolis (Aden) Memorial, is a war cemetery and memorial in the Heliopolis district of Cairo in Egypt for Commonwealth (Colonial British Empire) personnel of British Indian Army who died in World War I (WWI) and World War II (WWII). Of the 4,000 personals buried or commemorated here, 3727 are Indians - of whom nearly 2000 died in WWI and 1700 died in WWII.

"Heliopolis (Port Tewfik) Memorial" was relocated here and unveiled by the Indian Ambassador to Egypt in October 1980 after the original memorial at Port Tewfik at the South end of the Suez Canal was demolished due to severe damage during the 1967 Israeli-Egyptian conflict and 1973 Yom Kippur War. It commemorates 4,000 men who served and died with the British Indian Army during the WWI in Egypt and Palestine, and who have no known grave. The panels bearing the names, erected in the entrance pavilions to Heliopolis War Cemetery, were unveiled by the Indian Ambassador to Egypt in October 1980. It is maintained by the Commonwealth War Graves Commission. 1,742 Commonwealth casualties of WWII are buried or commemorated there, and it contains 83 war graves of people of other nationalities. This cemetery was designed by Hubert Worthington and the original Heliopolis (Port Tewfik) Memorial was designed by Captain Charles Sargeant Jagger MC.

"Heliopolis (Aden) Memorial" was rebuilt here to replace the original memorial at Steamer Point in Aden which was demolished in 1967 due to expansion of Aden Port. It commemorates more than 600 men of the Commonwealth forces who died in the defence of Aden during the WWI and who have no known grave. The panels bearing their names is erected in the pavilions to the rear of Heliopolis War Cemetery.

== Notable graves and commemorations ==
- Aidan Singh of Jodhpur (Imperial Service) Lancer
- Badlu Singh of 14th Murray's Jat Lancers
- Bhaguji of 3rd Sappers and Miners
- Geoffrey Nares
- Gurcharan of Queen Victoria’s Own Corps of Guides Infantry (Frontier Force) (Lumsden’s)
- Mohammad Yusuf Ali Khan of Patiala (Rajindra) Lancers
- Narayan Singh of 50 Kumaon Rifles
- Nazara Singh of 51st Sikhs (Frontier Force)
- Nikka Singh of 51st Sikhs (Frontier Force)
- Stephen Haggard
- Wilfrid Lewis Lloyd
- Sepoy Pahlwan Khan 69th Punjabis from Bhagwal

== See also ==
- Port Tewfik Memorial
