= Suez Port =

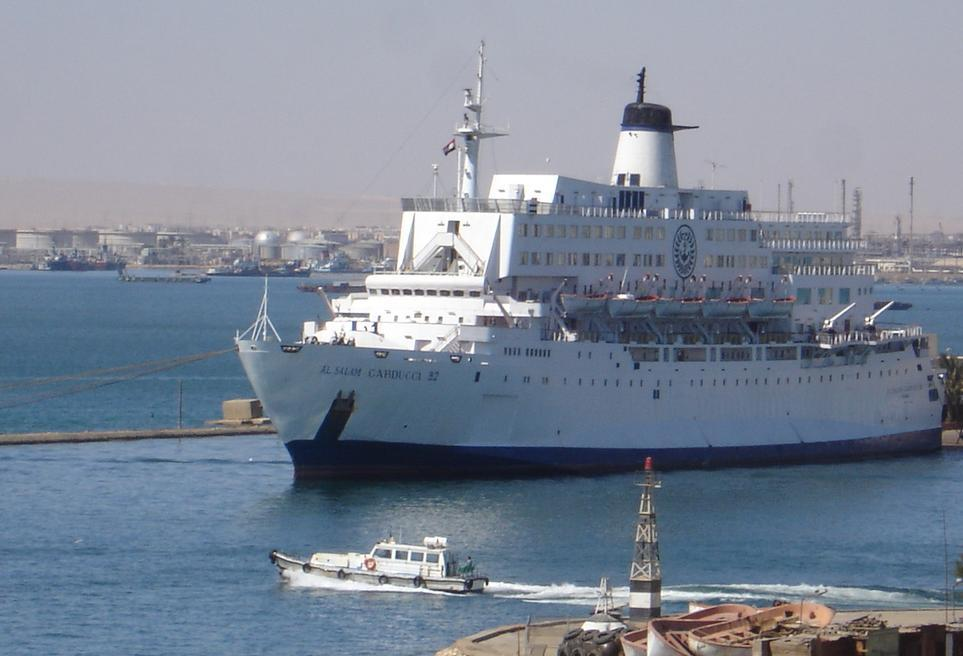
- El Salam Carducci 82 ship docked at Suez port, March 2006
- Interactive map of Suez Port

Location
- Country: Egypt
- Location: Suez Canal
- Coordinates: 29°57′0″N 32°33′0″E

The Suez Port (also called Port Tawfiq) is an Egyptian port located at the northern tip of the Gulf of Suez on the Red Sea at southern entrance of the Suez Canal, serving the canal and the city of Suez. It is owned and operated by the Ministry of Transport's General Authority of Red Sea Ports, and is home to the Suez Canal Authority (SCA) shipyards.

== History ==
Originally named Port Tewfik (or Port Tawfiq) after the then ruler Khedive Tewfik, the port was built in 1867 by the Suez Canal Company, and was part of its eponymous company town then at the outskirts of the town of Suez. It included a branch for the company and segregated housing for European management and Egyptian workers designed and built by French architects and contractors. Port Tewfiq was the third port town to be built by the company along the canal after Port Said and Ismailia.

== Geography ==
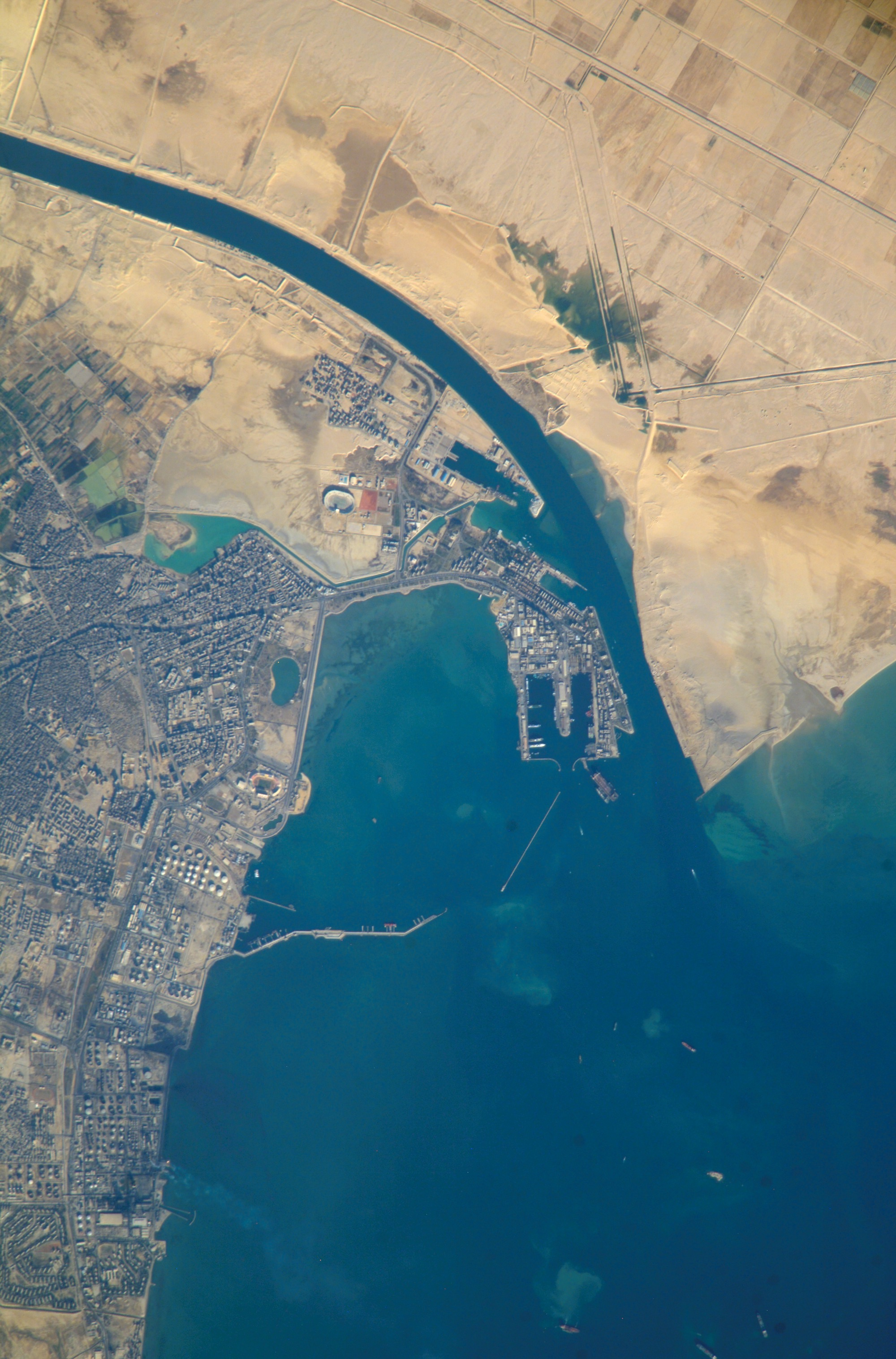
Photograph of the port and city which are the southern terminus of the Suez Canal that transits through Egypt and debouches into the Mediterranean Sea near Port Said

Enclosed in breakwaters is the artificial El Mira-El Gedda bay.

- Port Tewfik: to the West of the Suez Canal entrance. It uses the enclosed Ibrahim Dock.
- Petroleum Dock located on the east side of Suez port.
- Ataka Port fishing port; borders are limited by the port breakwaters.

The waters outside the boundaries of Ibrahim Dock, Petroleum Dock, Ataka Port, Adabiya Port and New Petroleum berth are within the Suez Canal jurisdiction.

== See also ==
- Transportation in Egypt
- Port Tewfik Memorial
