= Port Tewfik Memorial =

Memorial in Cairo

- Commonwealth War Graves Commission
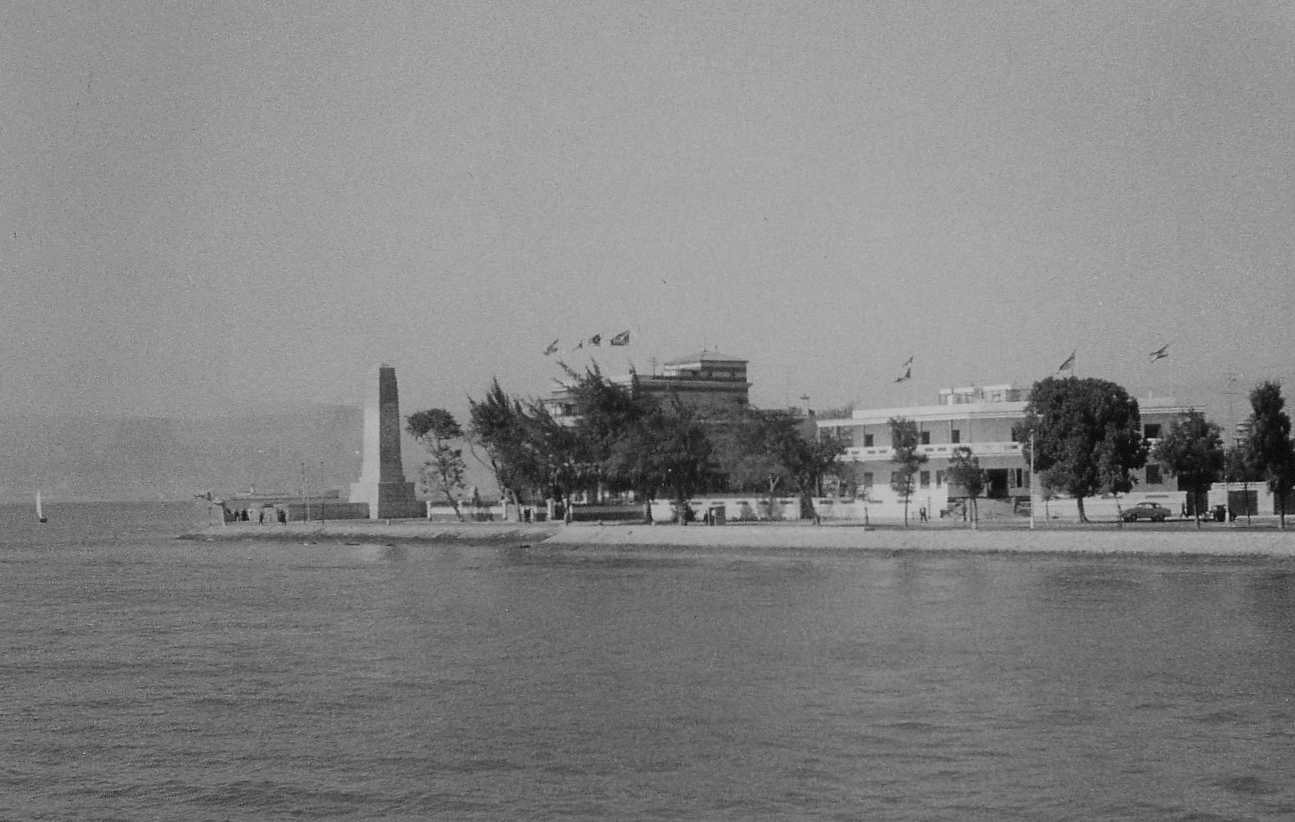
- The Port Tewfik Memorial in December 1957
- For officers and men of the Indian Army killed who gave their lives on the Sinai Peninsula in World War I
- Established: 1926
- Unveiled: 1926, destroyed 1967 & relocated
- Location: 29.9620°N 32.5582°E near Suez, Egypt; later relocated to Cairo Heliopolis
- Designed by: John James Burnet, Thomas S. Tait, Charles Sargeant Jagger
- Total burials: over 4000
- Commemorated: 4000

Burials by nation
- India

Burials by war
- First World War

The Port Tewfik Memorial (also known as the Indian War Memorial) was originally situated at Port Tewfik (or Port Taufiq), now called Suez Port, on the Suez Canal. It was unveiled in May 1926 for the Imperial War Graves Commission (now Commonwealth War Graves Commission) and commemorated 4,000 officers and men of the Indian Army killed during the Sinai and Palestine Campaign during the First World War. The original memorial was designed by Scottish architects John James Burnet and Thomas S. Tait, and included sculptures by British sculptor Charles Sargeant Jagger.

The memorial was destroyed following Six-Day War of 1967 and later relocated to the Heliopolis War Cemetery on Nabil el Wakkad Street in the Heliopolis district of Cairo. Panels bearing the names of the fallen have been mounted in the entrance pavilions to the War Cemetery.

The modern Heliopolis War Cemetery also contains:

- the Aden Memorial, commemorating over 600 men of the Commonwealth forces who died in the defence of Aden during the First World War. The Aden memorial was also destroyed during fighting in 1967.
- over 1,700 graves of Commonwealth service personnel killed during the Second World War and a number of war graves of other nationalities.

== See also ==
- Heliopolis War Cemetery
