= Hubert Worthington =

English architect

Sir John Hubert Worthington OBE RA FRIBA (4 July 1886 – 26 July 1963) was an English architect.

== Early life ==
Worthington was born at Alderley Edge, near Stockport, the youngest son of architect Thomas Worthington. He was educated at Sedbergh School from 1900–1905 and then at the Manchester University school of architecture, before being articled to his half-brother Percy. From 1912 until the outbreak of the First World War, Worthington spent two years working with Edwin Lutyens, whom Worthington found to be inspirational.

Worthington fought with distinction as a captain in the Manchester Regiment, and was severely wounded on 1 July 1916 during the offensive on the Somme, but he survived overnight in a shell hole and was rescued the following day. He rejoined Percy in the family firm in 1919.

== Career ==
In 1923, Worthington was appointed Professor of Architecture at the Royal College of Art, resigning in 1928 to return to the family firm of Thomas Worthington & Son. He was appointed as an Officer of the Order of the British Empire (OBE) in the 1929 New Year Honours. That same year he was appointed Slade Lecturer in architecture at Oxford University, and later designed many buildings for the university and its colleges, as well as the internal restoration of the Radcliffe Camera in 1939 and the Bodleian Library in 1955.

Following Percy Worthington's death in 1939, Hubert became the principal of the family firm. In 1943, he was appointed by the Imperial War Graves Commission (now, the Commonwealth War Graves Commission) as principal architect for Egypt and north Africa, work that involved the selection of sites and the design and supervision of the various cemeteries and memorials to the fallen and missing; among them the Malta Memorial one at Floriana, Malta, to missing airmen. The cemetery at El Alamein, which contains more than 7,000 graves, was designed by Worthington; as was the Heliopolis War Cemetery.

His major post-war rebuilding commission was the Inns of Court, London, including initial designs for the Inner Temple Hall and Library, reconstruction of Mitre Court and some restoration in King's Bench Walk, but Worthington's failure to manage the project to the satisfaction of the Benchers led to his dismissal, in the wake of substantial delays and financial mismanagement. The construction and final design of the Inner Temple Hall and Library was, therefore, completed by his assistant T. W. Sutcliffe and by Sir Edward Maufe who was brought in to replace Worthington.

Of more personal interest to Worthington was his work on repairing the damage caused to Manchester Cathedral during the Manchester Blitz of 1940, a task that was not completed until 1955.

== Honours ==
Worthington served as vice-president of the RIBA from 1943–5 and was a member of the Royal Fine Arts Commission from 1945–1950. He received a knighthood in 1949, was elected an associate member of the Royal Academy in 1945, and an Academician of the Society in 1955.
