= Fulham War Memorial =

War memorial in London

Coordinates: 51°28′08″N 0°12′40″W

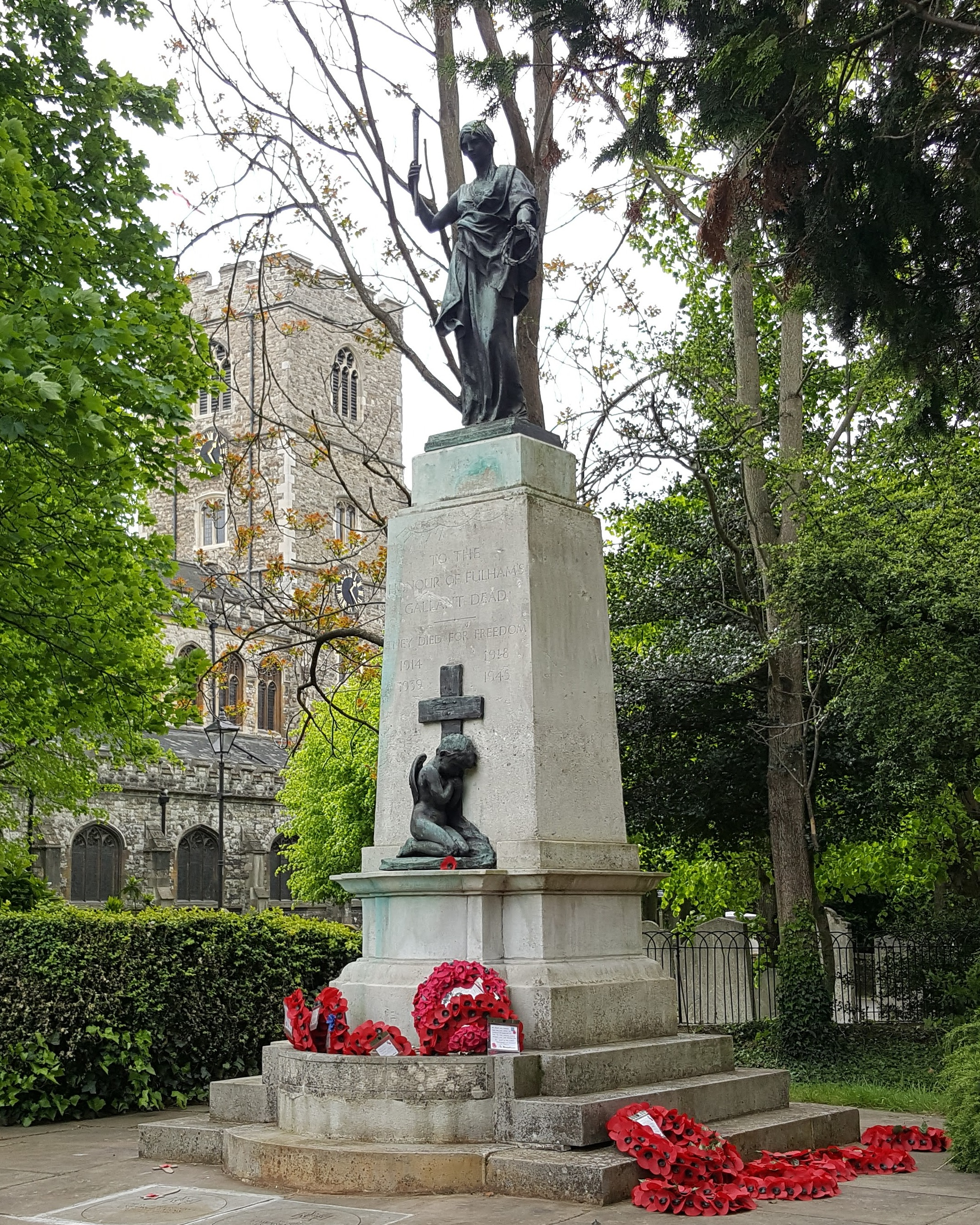
Fulham War Memorial

Fulham War Memorial is a Grade II listed monument at Vicarage Garden, Fulham High Street, Fulham, London.

It was built in 1921 and designed by the sculptor Alfred Turner, and comprises a bronze figure of Peace on top of a high Portland stone pedestal with three steps. There is also a bronze kneeling figure of a cherub against a rough cross on base. The inscription is "To the Honour of Fulham's Gallant Dead" "They died for freedom" 1914–1918 and 1939–1945.
