= Geoffrey Nares =

English actor

Geoffrey Owen Nares (10 June 1917 – 20 August 1942) was a British stage actor, a designer, and the younger son of actor Owen Ramsay Nares and his wife, actress Marie Pollini.

== Life and career ==
Nares' stage debut was at the Adelphi Theatre on 17 December 1934 where he played The stable boy in The Winning Post. In 1935, at the Globe Theatre, he played Kim Oldham in Grief Goes Over and that same year he played Martin Hilton in Call it a day in which his father, Owen, had the leading role as Roger Hilton.

== Death ==
In 1941, Nares joined the 12th Royal Lancers (The Prince of Wales's Royal Regiment of Lancers) and fought a hard war in the desert during which he contracted pappataci fever virus (also known as Phlebotomus fever and sandfly fever). He died in Cairo of a brain tumor, and was buried at the Heliopolis War Cemetery.
