= French law of 29 December 1915 =

Law to acquire cemeteries for soldiers

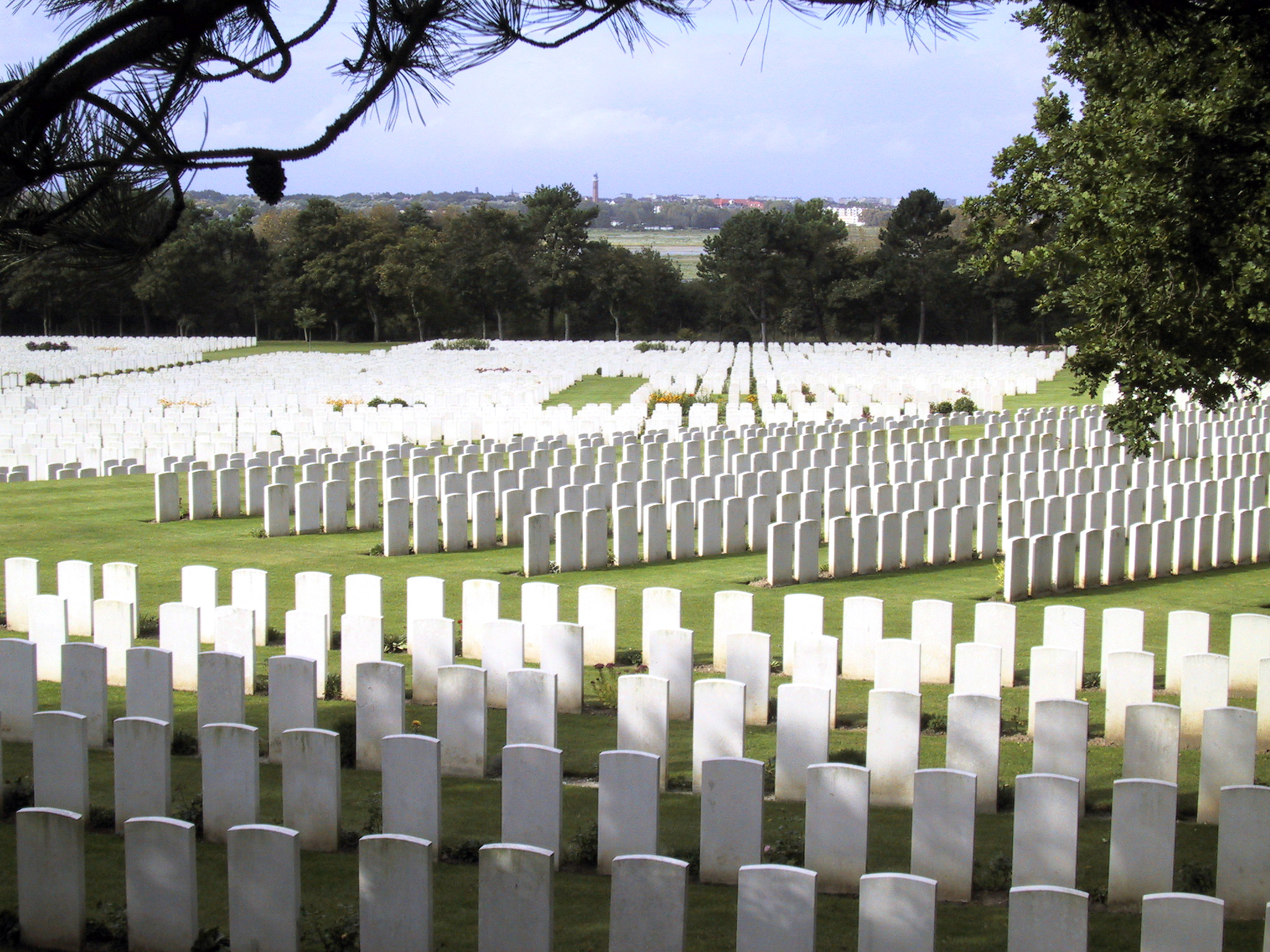
Étaples Military Cemetery, located in Northern France near the site of a number of Allied military hospitals, contains more than 10,000 First World War burials, the earliest dating to May 1915.

The French law of 29 December 1915 (French: Loi du 29 décembre 1915 concernant les lieux de sépulture à établir pour les soldats des armées françaises et alliées décédés pendant la durée de la guerre) gave the government the right to acquire land to be held in perpetuity for cemeteries for soldiers of the Allies who died in the First World War. It also granted the right for French soldiers to have individual graves and permitted temporary British cemeteries to remain in place as a "perpetual resting place". It became a model for the treatment of Allied fatalities in theatres elsewhere in the war.

== Background ==
Since the start of the First World War in August 1914 the British Army had buried their fatalities in civilian cemeteries close to the battlefields of the Western Front. By 1915 it was realised that this was not sustainable as the existing cemeteries were being overwhelmed by the number of burials. Fabian Ware, who served on the front with the British Red Cross took an interest in the matter and from spring 1915 spoke with French government representatives to discuss a long-term solution for military burials. Ware, fluent in French, advocated for the provision of permanent cemeteries in France for British military burials. Ware's case was taken up by the Adjutant-General of the British Expeditionary Force, Sir Nevil Macready, who formally asked for the right to purchase land for this purpose.

== Law ==
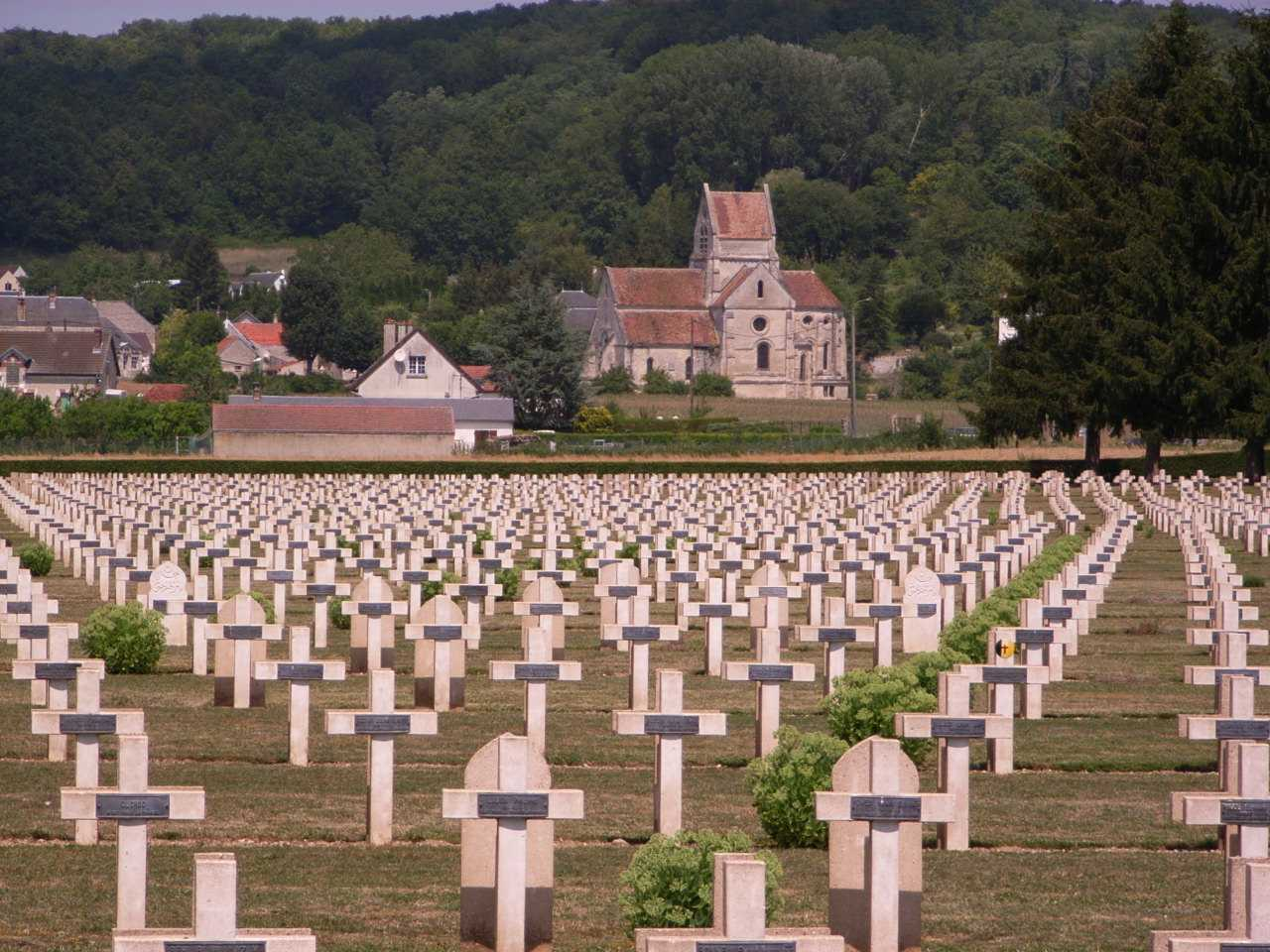
French war graves near Chemin des Dames, Aisne

There was some political opposition in France to permitting foreign governments to purchase large swathes of land. The French government instead decided to acquire the land themselves and make it available to foreign governments.

The law created a simplified eminent domain procedure for the acquisition of land for cemeteries. This was to be implemented by prefects when land could not be granted from local municipalities or purchased by negotiation. An area of 3 square metres (32 sq ft) per grave was permitted. An early draft of the law permitted acquisition by eminent domain only when existing civilian cemeteries were insufficient, but the final version permitted it in any circumstance. Additionally the law designated the temporary war cemeteries which had since been established by the British Army as "the free gift of the French people for a perpetual resting place of those who are laid there".

In addition to providing for foreign soldiers the law also changed the way French fatalities were treated. The law stated that "any soldier who has died for France has the right to a grave in perpetuity at the expense of the State". It granted for the first time the right for French soldiers to have, where possible, an individual and marked grave; mass graves had previously been permitted. The law also halted the practice of exhuming French bodies from the front and taking them to other parts of the country for burial; they would now be buried close to where they had died.

The law was passed in both chambers of the French Parliament on 29 December 1915.

== Impact ==
The law became a model for laws in other countries in which the Allies operated. Similar arrangements were made for the burial of Allied casualties in Belgium, Italy, Greece, Palestine, Iraq, Egypt, Germany and Turkey. The French war ministry used the law to replace existing mass graves with individual burials and to concentrate scattered burials in designated military cemeteries. This work began as soon as the law was passed but was interrupted by the German spring offensive in 1918. After the war's end the newly formed Office des Sépultures Militaires used the law to complete the work.

In 1917 the British Empire's Imperial War Graves Commission (IWGC), under Ware, became an association régulièrement constituée as defined by the law of 29 December 1915 and acted as the representative of the armed forces of the British Empire for war graves purposes. The IWGC took over this role from the Edward, Prince of Wales' National Committee for the Care of Soldiers' Graves, established in January 1916. The IWGC, which is now the Commonwealth War Graves Commission, continues to maintain Commonwealth cemeteries of the First and Second World Wars in France and elsewhere.
