= Badlu Singh =

Recipient of the Victoria Cross

Risaldar Badlu Singh VC
- Badlu Ram
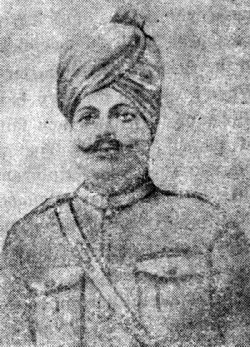
- Born: 13 January 1876; VPO Dhakla, Jhajjar district, Haryana, India
- Died: 23 September 1918 (aged 41); Khes Samariveh, Jordan River, Palestine
- Military career
- Allegiance: British India
- Branch: British Indian Army
- Service years: 1895 - 1918
- Rank: Risaldar
- Units: 14th Murray's Jat Lancers
- Conflicts: First World War †
- Awards: Victoria Cross

Badlu Singh VC (13 January 1876 – 23 September 1918) was an Indian recipient of the Victoria Cross, the highest and most prestigious award for gallantry in the face of the enemy that can be awarded to British and Commonwealth forces.

He was born in village Dhakla, district Rohtak (now Jhajjar), Haryana, India. His father was Lal Singh.

VC Badlu Singh was born in the village Dhakla of Rohtak (now Jhajjar District, Haryana), and joined the British Indian Army in 1895. He was a Risaldar in 14th Murray's Jat Lancers, British Indian Army, attached to 29th Lancers (Deccan Horse), during the First World War when he performed the deed on 23 September 1918 at Khes Samariveh, Jordan River, Palestine for which he was posthumously awarded the VC.

The citation reads:

His Majesty the KING has been graciously pleased to approve of the award of the Victoria Cross to the undermentioned Officer: —

Ressaidar [sic] Badlu Singh, late 14th Lancers, attached 29th Lancers, Indian Army.

For most conspicuous bravery and self-sacrifice on the morning of 23 September 1918, when his squadron charged a strong enemy position on the west bank of the River Jordan, between the river and Kh. es [sic] Samariveh Village.

On nearing the position Ressaidar [sic] Badlu Singh realised that the squadron was suffering casualties from a small hill on the left front occupied by machine guns and 200 infantry. Without the slightest hesitation he collected six other ranks and with the greatest dash and an entire disregard of danger charged and captured the position, thereby saving very heavy casualties to the squadron. He was mortally wounded on the very top of the hill when capturing one of the machine guns single-handed, but all the machine guns and infantry had surrendered to him before he died.

His valour and initiative were of the highest order. London Gazette, 27 November 1918.

He is commemorated on the Heliopolis (Port Tewfik) Memorial in the Heliopolis War Cemetery, Cairo, Egypt. The VC medal is currently in Red Fort Museum, his family gave up the medal to the Government. Today the descendants of VC Badlu Singh reside in Dhakla, Haryana.

== See also ==
- Jat Regiment
- Prominence of Jats and Haryanvis in military
- Orders, decorations, and medals of India
