= Alfred Turner (sculptor) =

English sculptor

- Born: 28 May 1874; London, England
- Died: 18 March 1940 (aged 65); London, England
- Education: South London Technical Art School; Royal Academy Schools
- Known for: Sculpture

Alfred Turner RA (28 May 1874 – 18 March 1940) was an English sculptor notable for several large public monuments. These included statues of Queen Victoria, works in the Fishmonger's Hall in London and several war memorials, both in the Britiah Isles and abroad.

Among other institutions, Turner studied at the Royal Academy, where he exhibited and was a member. He was also a member and fellow of the Royal Society of British Sculptors. His daughter was also a distinguished sculptor.

== Biography ==
Turner was born in London on 28 May 1874, the son of sculptor C.E. Halsey-Turner. In 1899 he married Charlotte Ann Gavin and they had two daughters. One daughter, Winifred, became a distinguished sculptor.

He first studied at, what was then called, the South London Technical Art School in Lambeth at a time when William Silver Frith was the modelling master. He then studied at Royal Academy Schools, having enrolled in 1895. He was there for three years during which time he was awarded in 1897 both the gold medal and travelling scholarship, worth £200. He studied for a period on the Continent and worked as an assistant in the studio of Harry Bates. Turner taught sculpture at the Central School of Arts and Crafts in Southampton Row, Holborn in 1907.

Turner exhibited at the Royal Academy from 1898 to 1937, became an Associate in 1922 and a full member in 1931. He was one of the early members of the Royal Society of British Sculptors and was a Fellow of that Society from 1923 until 1940. He died in London on 18 March 1940.

In 1988 the Ashmolean Museum in Oxford held an exhibition of the works of Alfred Turner and his daughter Winifred.

== Notable commissions ==
=== Fishmonger's Hall ===
In 1901 Turner exhibited a marble statue entitled Fisher girl; for a niche at the Royal Academy. In 1902 this work, renamed Fisherwoman, with a companion piece, Fisherman, was placed in the staircase niches of Fishmonger's Hall in London. Turner was given the commission to sculpt the two figures in 1899 when the hall was being redecorated. He received the commission based on the recommendation of William Silver Frith and was paid around 600 guineas for each statue.

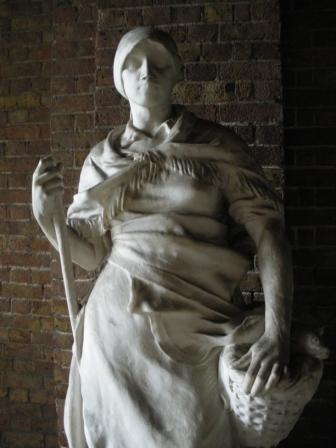
"Fisherwoman"

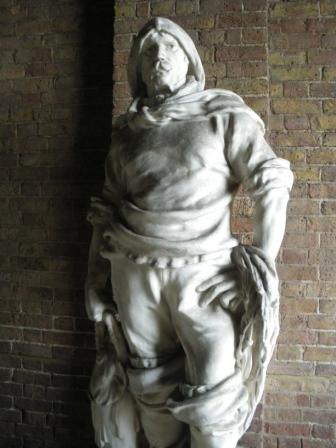
"Fisherman"

=== Statues of Queen Victoria ===
After the success of "Fishergirl", Turner secured commissions for three public monuments in bronze of Queen Victoria who died in January 1901. One was for Delhi and was unveiled by the Lieutenant-Governor of the Punjab on 26 December 1902. Turner showed a bronze statuette of that work at the Royal Academy in 1903. The crown and the small statuettes representing "Justice" and "Peace", which were positioned on either side of the Queen's head were subsequently removed by vandals in 1905 when the statue was in India. Today the statue is at the College of Art, Tilak Marg, in Delhi. Another version of the Queen Victoria statue was made for Tynemouth in north east England.

The third statue was for Sheffield and was a complex, larger than life-size, composition with figures of a mother and her children and a Sheffield workman. It was originally erected in 1905 at Fargate, but was moved to Sheffield's Endcliffe Park. The mother and workman are depicted in Maternity and Labour, both shown at The Royal Academy in 1904. The statue has reliefs representing Courage, in the form of a Crusader, with Justice and Truth. Another includes images of the Queen and St George.

Turner was praised for his work. The statues were likened to Rodin's "Le Penseur" and the works of George Frederick Watts. Additionally it was stated that "Maternity is the best work by an outsider that the Academy has housed for many a year". (Note: In Tate Britain Archive there is a copy of the agreement dated 13 June 1905 between Turner and the Sheffield authorities. Turner was paid £3000 for his work. Thomas Brock was named in the agreement as one of two sureties.)

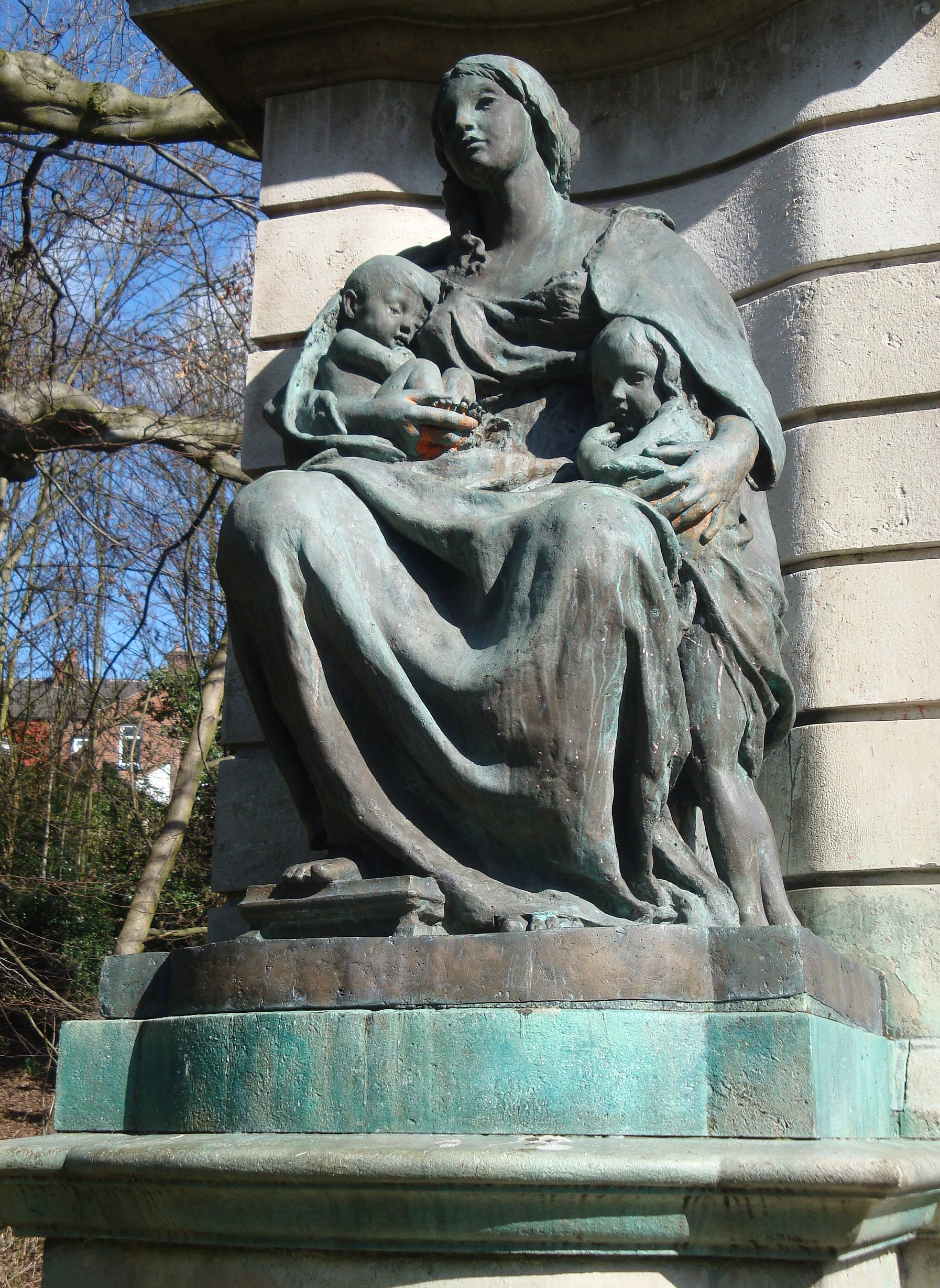
Queen Victoria, "Maternity"

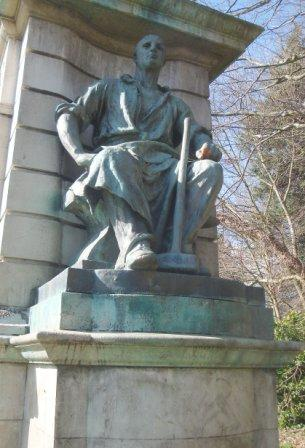
Queen Victoria,"Labour"

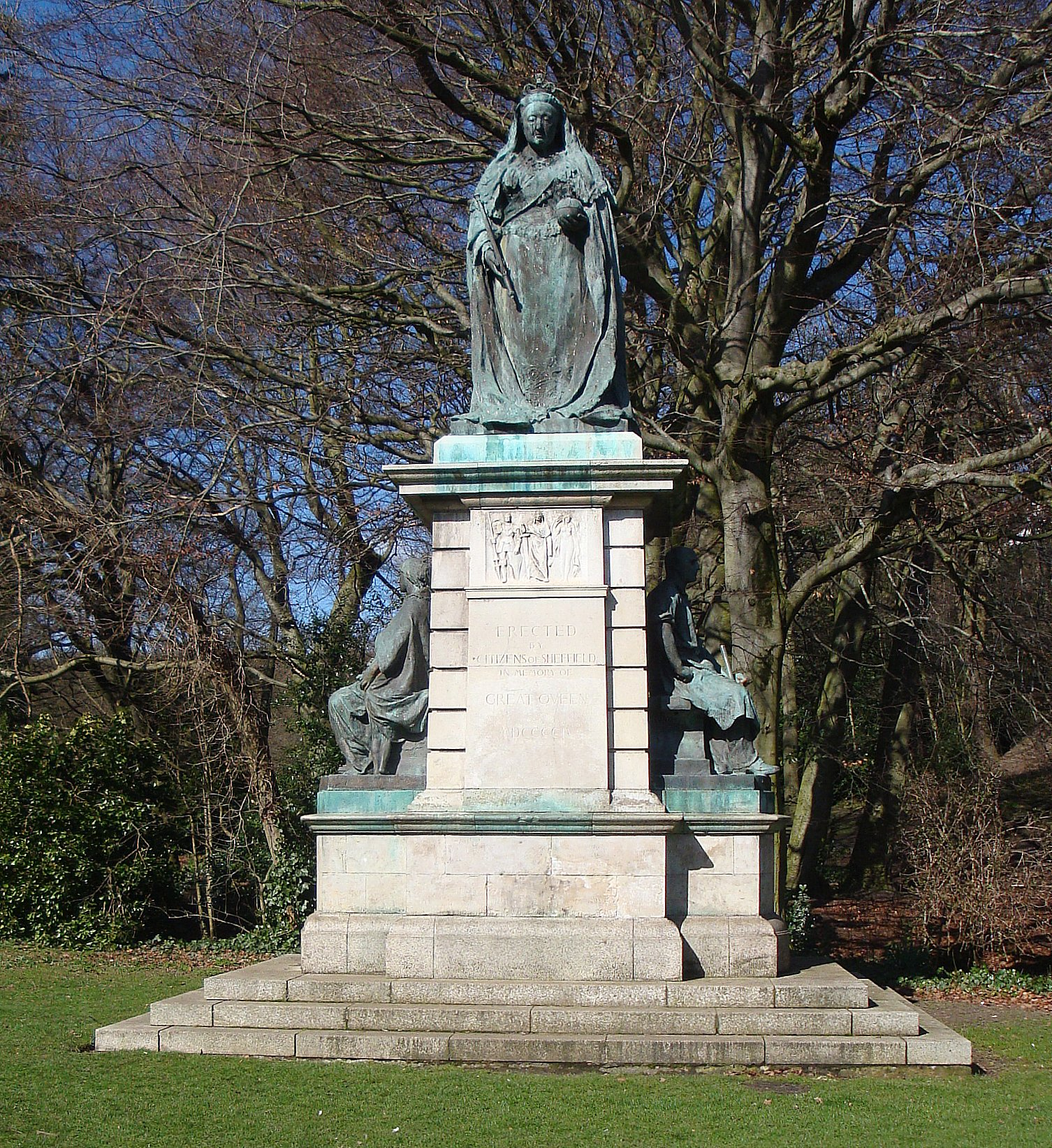
Queen Victoria monument, Sheffield

=== Old Bailey reliefs ===
In 1905 and 1906 Turner worked on a commission for the new Central Criminal Court building, the Old Bailey, in London. He produced three bas-reliefs in Portland stone, illustrating a quotation from Psalm 72-"Defend the children of the poor. Punish the wrong-doer". The reliefs are positioned inside the main entrance. The panel on the left side features an angel, her sword drawn to protect a woman and her children (the defence of the children of the poor) and that on the right shows a warrior who has slain a dragon and holds a severed head (punishing the wrongdoer). At his side a woman holds his shield. In the central panel another angel holds a globe and points downwards towards the building's main entrance. She is flanked by "Spring", who sews seed from a basket and "Autumn" who holds a sickle and a sheaf of wheat. Turner also designed some metal grills for New Sessions House (leaf-like clouds, a sun burst and a nude infant crowned by child angels).

=== South African War Memorial ===
Turner was selected by Sir Herbert Baker to execute the Castor, Pollux and Horse sculpture on the South African War Memorial at Delville Wood in the Somme region of France and this led to his participation in the Cape Town and Pretoria War Memorials. A plaster cast of "Dioscuri", the title of Turner's work, was shown in the forecourt of Burlington House in 1925 before the bronze was despatched to France and unveiled on 10 October 1926 by the widow of General Botha. Two full-size bronze replicas went to South Africa in April 1928, one being erected in front of Capitol Buildings in Pretoria and the other in Cape Town. A bronze model was also placed in the Queen's Hall of the South African Houses of Parliament. 10 October was chosen as the unveiling date as this was the date in 1899 when the first shot was fired in the South African War and the date in 1908 of the National Conference which brought the Union of South Africa into being. In file TGA 8713.1.7 at Tate Britain Archive there is a copy of the unveiling ceremony programme of Sunday 10 October 1926. This describes the bronze sculpture as follows:

"The stone dome which crowns the monument supports a group in bronze of two men representing Physical Energy and the two races of South Africa, between them leading a war horse into battle, and with one hand clasped over the horse's back. The group was inspired by the Greek sculpture of the twin gods Castor and Pollux and their horses guarding the steps of the Capitol at Rome, and by the legend of the great twin brethren who came overseas to fight in the ranks of Rome".

== Selected public works ==
Image	Title / subject	Location and coordinates	Date	Type	Material	Dimensions	Designation	Wikidata	Notes
More images	Queen Victoria	Front Street, Tynemouth	1902	Seated statue on pedestal	Bronze and Portland stone		Grade II	Q26276238	
More images	Queen Victoria	Endcliffe Park, Sheffield	1904	Statue on pedestal with supporting figures	Bronze and limestone		Grade II	Q26546446	
More images	Owain Glyndŵr	The Marble Hall, City Hall, Cardiff	1916	Statue	Serrvezza marble				
More images	War memorial	Radyr, Wales	c. 1920s	Statue on pedestal with lower figure	Bronze and Portland stone		Grade II	Q29500019	
More images	Fulham War Memorial	Vicarage Gardens, Fulham, London	1921, relocated 1934	Statue on pedestal with lower figure	Bronze and stone		Grade II	Q15978993	
More images	Edgar Mobbs	Abington Square, Northampton	1921, re-sited 1937	Statue on pedestal with bust and panels	Bronze and Portland stone		Grade II*	Q66478828	
	War memorial	Kingsthorpe, Northamptonshire	1921	Statue on pedestal with panels	Bronze and stone		Grade II	Q66479656	Statue stolen in 1990, 2002 replacement by Olive Wooton.
More images	Winchester College War Cloister	Winchester College, Hampshire	1922-1924	Cross and figures	Stone		Grade I	Q26387800	For Sir Herbert Baker's War Cloister design, Turner's created a Latin Cross on either side of which is the figure of a knight. Other elements are by Charles Wheeler and Reginald Gleadowe.
More images	War memorial	Victoria College, Jersey	1924	Statue on pedestal	Bronze and granite	4.5m tall			Lettering by Mr.F.Huaut.
	Memorial to John Constable	The Crypt, St Paul's Cathedral, London	1936	Relief plaque	Marble				Created to mark the centenary of Constable's death (1 April 1937).
More images	War memorial	Company's Garden, Cape Town, South Africa	1930s	Sculpture group on gazebo	Bronze and stone				Architect, Herbert Baker, replica of the Delville Wood South African National Memorial sculpture

=== Other works ===
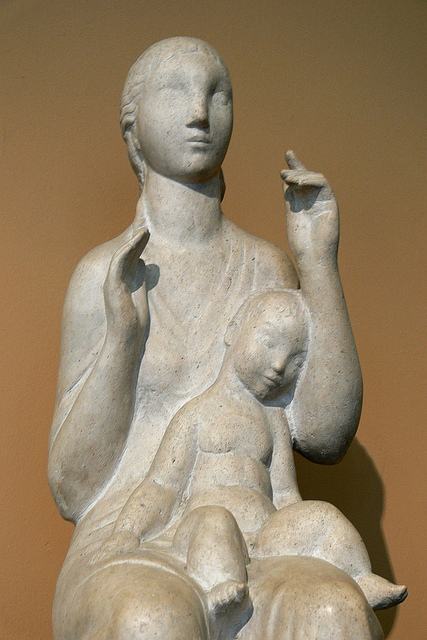
Mother and Child

- Cycle of Life, a bronze panel exhibited at the Royal Academy in 1913.
- Dreams of Youth, 1932, Turner's Diploma Work for the Royal Academy.
- Psyche, a marble statue dating from 1918 to 1919 was purchased in 1921 by the President and Council of the Royal Academy under the terms of the Chantrey Bequest and is now in Tate Britain.
- The Hand, 1936, Tate Britain, purchased by the administrators of the Chantrey Bequest.
- St George sculpture, whereabouts unknown, cast for use as a mascot for Lord Dureen's Rolls-Royce in 1927
- Mother and Child, 1936, given to the Victoria & Albert Museum by Miss Jessica Turner, one of Turner's daughters.
- Turner sculpted the King Edward VII Memorial at Lyalipur in India, modern-day Faisalabad in Pakistan. It is not known if the work is still there.
