= Coins of the Australian pound =

Pre-decimal Australian coins

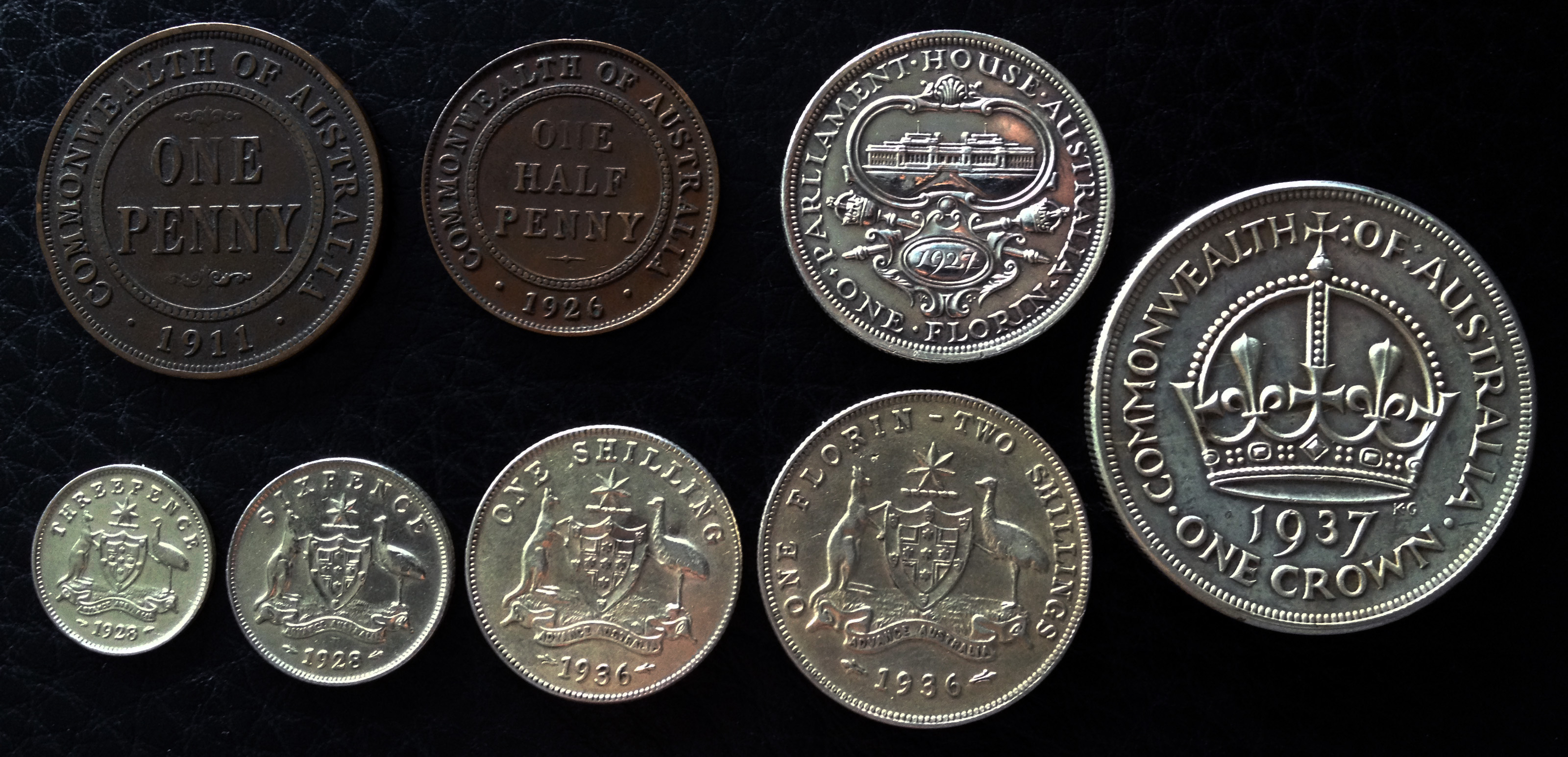
Early Australian Imperial Coins—1926 half penny, 1911 penny, 1923 threepence, 1928 sixpence, 1936 shilling, 1936 florin, 1927 florin, and 1937 crown

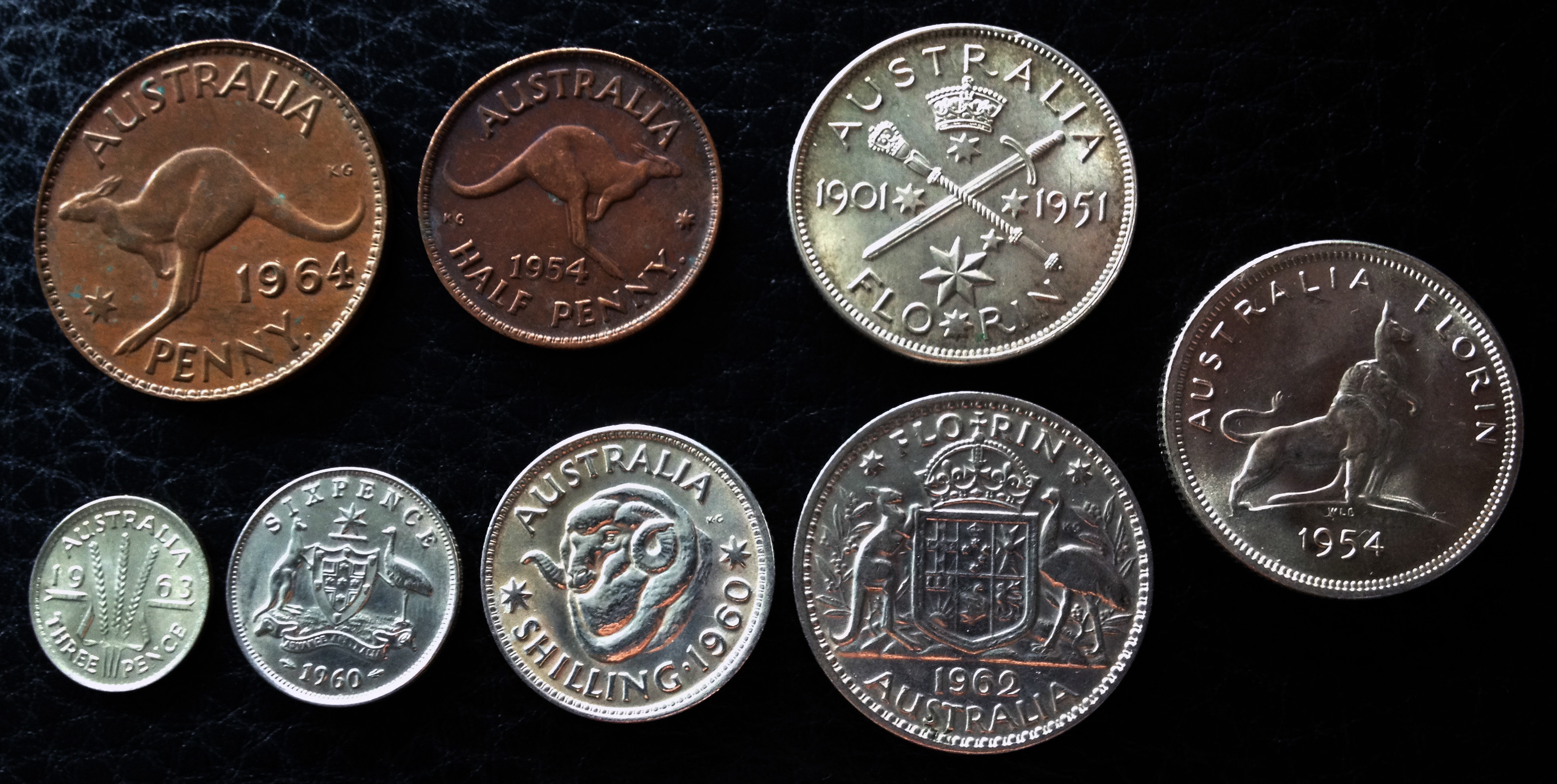
Late Australian Imperial Coins—1954 half penny, 1964 penny, 1963 threepence, 1960 sixpence, 1960 shilling, 1962 florin, 1951 florin, and 1954 florin

Pre-decimal Australian coins arose when the Federation of Australia gave the constitutional power to Commonwealth of Australia to mint its own coinage in 1901. The new power allowed the Commonwealth to issue legal tender rather than individually through the six former British self-governing colonies of Queensland, New South Wales, Victoria, Tasmania, South Australia, and Western Australia.

However, with the adoption of a Federal government in Australia, British coins continued to be used until 1910 when the first Australian silver coins were introduced. These new coins, which included florins, shillings, sixpences and threepences, were all minted with a portrait of Edward VII. A year later Australian pennies and half-pennies entered circulation. Unlike in New Zealand, there was no half-crown. In 1931 gold sovereigns stopped being minted in Australia. A crown or five-shilling coin was minted in 1937 and 1938.

Coinage of the Australian pound was replaced by decimalised coins of the Australian dollar on 14 February 1966. The conversion rate was A$2 = A£1.

== Australian £sd ==
In 1898 the British government allowed two colonies, New South Wales and Victoria, to mint silver and bronze coins at their mints in Sydney and Melbourne respectively.

=== Debasement ===
In 1946, due to costs incurred during World War II, the silver content of the coins was reduced from 0.925 to 0.500 of the coin weight, which lasted until decimalisation on 14 February 1966. One coin highly sought after by collectors is the 1930 penny.

== Coins ==
Image		Value	Technical parameters			Description			Date of		Dated years of issue
Obverse	Reverse	Value	Diameter	Mass	Composition	Obverse	Reverse	Edge	First issue	Withdrawal	Dated years of issue
		Half penny (½d)	25.5 mm	5.67 g	Bronze (97% copper, 2.5% zinc, 0.5% tin)	Portrait of King George V. Designed by Sir E. B. Mackennal.	At centre within a circle of beads, the denomination "ONE HALF PENNY" in three lines above a plain scroll; around the circle of beads, "COMMONWEALTH OF AUSTRALIA" and date. Designed by W. H. Blackmore.	Plain	1911	14 February 1966	1911–1936
		Half penny (½d)	25.5 mm	5.67 g	Bronze (97% copper, 2.5% zinc, 0.5% tin)	Portrait of King George VI. Designed by Thomas H. Paget.	At centre within a circle of beads, the denomination "ONE HALF PENNY" in three lines above a plain scroll; around the circle of beads, "COMMONWEALTH OF AUSTRALIA" and date. Designed by W. H. Blackmore.	Plain	1938	14 February 1966	1938–1939
		Half penny (½d)	25.5 mm	5.67 g	Bronze (97% copper, 2.5% zinc, 0.5% tin)	Portrait of King George VI. Designed by Thomas H. Paget.	Kangaroo facing right, "AUSTRALIA" above and "HALF PENNY" below, date above denomination. Designed by George Kruger Gray.	Plain	1939	14 February 1966	1939–1952
		Half penny (½d)	25.5 mm	5.67 g	Bronze (97% copper, 2.5% zinc, 0.5% tin)	Portrait of Queen Elizabeth II. Designed by Mrs Mary Gillick.	Kangaroo facing right, "AUSTRALIA" above and "HALF PENNY" below, date above denomination. Designed by George Kruger Gray.	Plain	1953	14 February 1966	1953–1955, 1959–1964
		Penny (1d)	30.8 mm	9.45 g	Bronze (97% copper, 2.5% zinc, 0.5% tin)	Portrait of King George V. Designed by Sir E. B. Mackennal.	At centre within a circle of beads, the denomination "ONE PENNY" in three lines above a plain scroll; around the circle of beads, "COMMONWEALTH OF AUSTRALIA" and date. Designed by W. H. Blackmore.	Plain	1911	14 February 1966	1911–1936
		Penny (1d)	30.8 mm	9.45 g	Bronze (97% copper, 2.5% zinc, 0.5% tin)	Portrait of King George VI. Designed by Thomas H. Paget.	Kangaroo facing left, "AUSTRALIA" above and "PENNY" below, date above denomination. Designed by George Kruger Gray.	Plain	1938	14 February 1966	1938–1952
		Penny (1d)	30.8 mm	9.45 g	Bronze (97% copper, 2.5% zinc, 0.5% tin)	Portrait of Queen Elizabeth II. Designed by Mrs Mary Gillick.	Kangaroo facing left, "AUSTRALIA" above and "PENNY" below, date above denomination. Designed by George Kruger Gray.	Plain	1953	14 February 1966	1953, 1955–1964
		Threepence (3d)	16 mm	1.41 g	Sterling silver (92.5% silver, 7.5% copper)	Portrait of King Edward VII. Designed by George W. De Saulles.	At centre, 1908 Australian coat of arms. Motto in the ribbon "ADVANCE AUSTRALIA", "THREEPENCE" above and date between arrow heads below. Designed by W. H. Blackmore.	Plain	1910	14 February 1966	1910
		Threepence (3d)	16 mm	1.41 g	Sterling silver (92.5% silver, 7.5% copper)	Portrait of King George V. Designed by Sir E. B. Mackennal.	At centre, 1908 Australian coat of arms. Motto in the ribbon "ADVANCE AUSTRALIA", "THREEPENCE" above and date between arrow heads below. Designed by W. H. Blackmore.	Plain	1911	14 February 1966	1911–1912. 1914–1928, 1934–1936
		Threepence (3d)	16 mm	1.41 g	Sterling silver (92.5% silver, 7.5% copper)	Portrait of King George VI. Designed by Thomas H. Paget.	Three ears of wheat held by a curved ribbon, AUSTRALIA", below divided into two by the stalks of the wheat "THREE PENCE", above, across the middle of the coin the date divided into two by the ears. Designed by George Kruger Gray.	Plain	1938	14 February 1966	1938–1944
		Threepence (3d)	16 mm	1.41 g	50% silver, 40% copper, 5% zinc, 5% nickel	Portrait of King George VI. Designed by Thomas H. Paget.	Three ears of wheat held by a curved ribbon, AUSTRALIA", below divided into two by the stalks of the wheat "THREE PENCE", above, across the middle of the coin the date divided into two by the ears. Designed by George Kruger Gray.	Plain	1947	14 February 1966	1947–1952
		Threepence (3d)	16 mm	1.41 g	50% silver, 40% copper, 5% zinc, 5% nickel	Portrait of Queen Elizabeth II. Designed by Mrs Mary Gillick.	Three ears of wheat held by a curved ribbon, AUSTRALIA", below divided into two by the stalks of the wheat "THREE PENCE", above, across the middle of the coin the date divided into two by the ears. Designed by George Kruger Gray.	Plain	1953	14 February 1966	1953–1964
		Sixpence (6d)	19 mm	2.83 g	Sterling silver (92.5% silver, 7.5% copper)	Portrait of King Edward VII. Designed by George W. De Saulles.	At centre, 1908 Australian coat of arms. Motto in the ribbon "ADVANCE AUSTRALIA", "SIXPENCE" above and date under the crest below. Designed by W. H. Blackmore.	Redded	1910	14 February 1966	1910
		Sixpence (6d)	19 mm	2.83 g	Sterling silver (92.5% silver, 7.5% copper)	Portrait of King George V. Designed by Sir E. B. Mackennal.	At centre, 1908 Australian coat of arms. Motto in the ribbon "ADVANCE AUSTRALIA", "SIXPENCE" above and date under the crest below. Designed by W. H. Blackmore.	Redded	1911	14 February 1966	1911–1912, 1914, 1916–1928, 1934–1936
		Sixpence (6d)	19 mm	2.83 g	Sterling silver (92.5% silver, 7.5% copper)	Portrait of King George VI. Designed by Thomas H. Paget.	At centre, 1908 Australian coat of arms. Motto in the ribbon "ADVANCE AUSTRALIA", "SIXPENCE" above and date under the crest below. Designed by W. H. Blackmore.	Redded	1938	14 February 1966	1938–1945
		Sixpence (6d)	19 mm	2.83 g	50% silver, 40% copper, 5% zinc, 5% nickel	Portrait of King George VI. Designed by Thomas H. Paget.	At centre, 1908 Australian coat of arms. Motto in the ribbon "ADVANCE AUSTRALIA", "SIXPENCE" above and date under the crest below. Designed by W. H. Blackmore.	Redded	1946	14 February 1966	1946, 1948, 1950–1952
		Sixpence (6d)	19 mm	2.83 g	50% silver, 40% copper, 5% zinc, 5% nickel	Portrait of Queen Elizabeth II. Designed by Mrs Mary Gillick.	At centre, 1908 Australian coat of arms. Motto in the ribbon "ADVANCE AUSTRALIA", "SIXPENCE" above and date under the crest below. Designed by W. H. Blackmore.	Redded	1953	14 February 1966	1953–1963
		Shilling (1/-)	23.5 mm	5.65 g	Sterling silver (92.5% silver, 7.5% copper)	Portrait of King Edward VII. Designed by George W. De Saulles.	At centre, 1908 Australian coat of arms. Motto in the ribbon "ADVANCE AUSTRALIA", "ONE SHILLING" above and date under the crest below. Designed by W. H. Blackmore.	Redded	1910	14 February 1966	1910
		Shilling (1/-)	23.5 mm	5.65 g	Sterling silver (92.5% silver, 7.5% copper)	Portrait of King George V. Designed by Sir E. B. Mackennal.	At centre, 1908 Australian coat of arms. Motto in the ribbon "ADVANCE AUSTRALIA", "ONE SHILLING" above and date under the crest below. Designed by W. H. Blackmore.	Redded	1911	14 February 1966	1911–1922, 1924–1928, 1931, 1933–1936
		Shilling (1/-)	23.5 mm	5.65 g	Sterling silver (92.5% silver, 7.5% copper)	Portrait of King George VI. Designed by Thomas H. Paget.	Ram's head facing left, "AUSTRALIA" above, two Federation stars, "SHILLING" and year below. Designed by George Kruger Gray.	Redded	1938	14 February 1966	1938–1944
		Shilling (1/-)	23.5 mm	5.65 g	50% silver, 40% copper, 5% zinc, 5% nickel	Portrait of King George VI. Designed by Thomas H. Paget.	Ram's head facing left, "AUSTRALIA" above, two Federation stars, "SHILLING" and year below. Designed by George Kruger Gray.	Redded	1946	14 February 1966	1946, 1948, 1950, 1952
		Shilling (1/-)	23.5 mm	5.65 g	50% silver, 40% copper, 5% zinc, 5% nickel	Portrait of Queen Elizabeth II. Designed by Mrs Mary Gillick.	Ram's head facing left, "AUSTRALIA" above, two Federation stars, "SHILLING" and year below. Designed by George Kruger Gray.	Redded	1953	14 February 1966	1953–1963
		Florin (2/-)	28.5 mm	11.31 g	Sterling silver (92.5% silver, 7.5% copper)	Portrait of King Edward VII. Designed by George W. De Saulles.	At centre, 1908 Australian coat of arms. Motto in the ribbon "ADVANCE AUSTRALIA", "ONE FLORIN – TWO SHILLINGS" above and date under the crest below. Designed by W. H. Blackmore.	Redded	1910	14 February 1966	1910
		Florin (2/-)	28.5 mm	11.31 g	Sterling silver (92.5% silver, 7.5% copper)	Portrait of King George V. Designed by Sir E. B. Mackennal.	At centre, 1908 Australian coat of arms. Motto in the ribbon "ADVANCE AUSTRALIA", "ONE FLORIN – TWO SHILLINGS" above and date under the crest below. Designed by W. H. Blackmore.	Redded	1911	14 February 1966	1911–1928, 1931–1936
		Florin (2/-)	28.5 mm	11.31 g	Sterling silver (92.5% silver, 7.5% copper)	Portrait of King George V. Designed by Sir E. B. Mackennal.	Old Parliament House within an oval frame set above crossed sceptres. Superimposed on the sceptres is a raised oval with the date 1927 incuse, "PARLIAMENT HOUSE AUSTRALIA" above, ONE FLORIN below. Designed by George Kruger Gray.	Redded	1927	14 February 1966	1927
		Florin (2/-)	28.5 mm	11.31 g	Sterling silver (92.5% silver, 7.5% copper)	Portrait of King George V. Designed by Percy Metcalf.	Naked rider advancing to the left holding a flaming torch aloft; in exergue, "FLORIN", "CENTENARY . VICTORIA . MELBOURNE . 1934–35." above. Designed by George Kruger Gray.	Redded	1934/35	14 February 1966	1934/35
		Florin (2/-)	28.5 mm	11.31 g	Sterling silver (92.5% silver, 7.5% copper)	Portrait of King George VI. Designed by Thomas H. Paget.	Based on the arms of the Commonwealth of Australia, as authorised by Royal Warrant 19 September 1912. "FLORIN" above between two seven pointed stars. below, in the exergue the date, "AUSTRALIA" below. Designed by George Kruger Gray.	Redded	1938	14 February 1966	1938–1945
		Florin (2/-)	28.5 mm	11.31 g	50% silver, 40% copper, 5% zinc, 5% nickel	Portrait of King George VI. Designed by Thomas H. Paget.	Based on the arms of the Commonwealth of Australia, as authorised by Royal Warrant 19 September 1912. "FLORIN" above between two seven pointed stars. below, in the exergue the date, "AUSTRALIA" below. Designed by George Kruger Gray.	Redded	1946	14 February 1966	1946–1947, 1951–1952
		Florin (2/-)	28.5 mm	11.31 g	50% silver, 40% copper, 5% zinc, 5% nickel	Portrait of King George VI. Designed by Thomas H. Paget.	A sceptre and sword crossing below a crown and above the Federation Star with the stars of the Southern Cross around, "AUSTRALIA" above, "FLORIN" below and split into two parts by a star, to left "1901" and to right "1951". Designed by William Leslie Bowles.	Redded	1951	14 February 1966	1951
		Florin (2/-)	28.5 mm	11.31 g	50% silver, 40% copper, 5% zinc, 5% nickel	Based on the arms of the Commonwealth of Australia, as authorised by Royal Warrant 19 September 1912. "FLORIN" above between two seven pointed stars. below, in the exergue the date, "AUSTRALIA" below. Designed by George Kruger Gray.	Portrait of Queen Elizabeth II. Designed by Mrs Mary Gillick.	Redded	1953	14 February 1966	1953–1954, 1956–1963
		Florin (2/-)	28.5 mm	11.31 g	50% silver, 40% copper, 5% zinc, 5% nickel	A lion and a kangaroo standing together on a curved ground line facing right, "AUSTRALIA FLORIN" above, below in exergue, "1954". Designed by William Leslie Bowles.	Portrait of Queen Elizabeth II. Designed by Mrs Mary Gillick.	Redded	1954	14 February 1966	1954
		Crown (5/-)	38.5 mm	28.27 g	Sterling silver (92.5% silver, 7.5% copper)	Portrait of King George VI. Designed by Thomas H. Paget.	At centre the Imperial crown with the date below, "COMMONWEALTH OF AUSTRALIA" above, "ONE CROWN" below. Designed by George Kruger Gray.	Redded	1937	14 February 1966	1937–1938
These images are to scale at 2.5 pixels per millimetre. For table standards, see the coin specification table.											

== Pre-decimal commemorative coins ==
Florin = 2 shillings

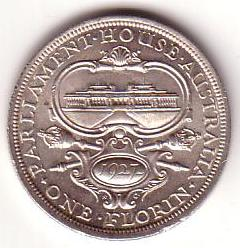
1927 Australian florin commemorating the opening of the original Parliament House

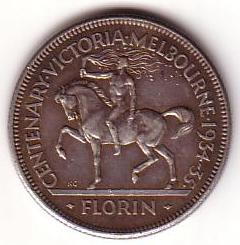
1934-35 Australian florin commemorating the centenary of Victoria and the establishment of Melbourne

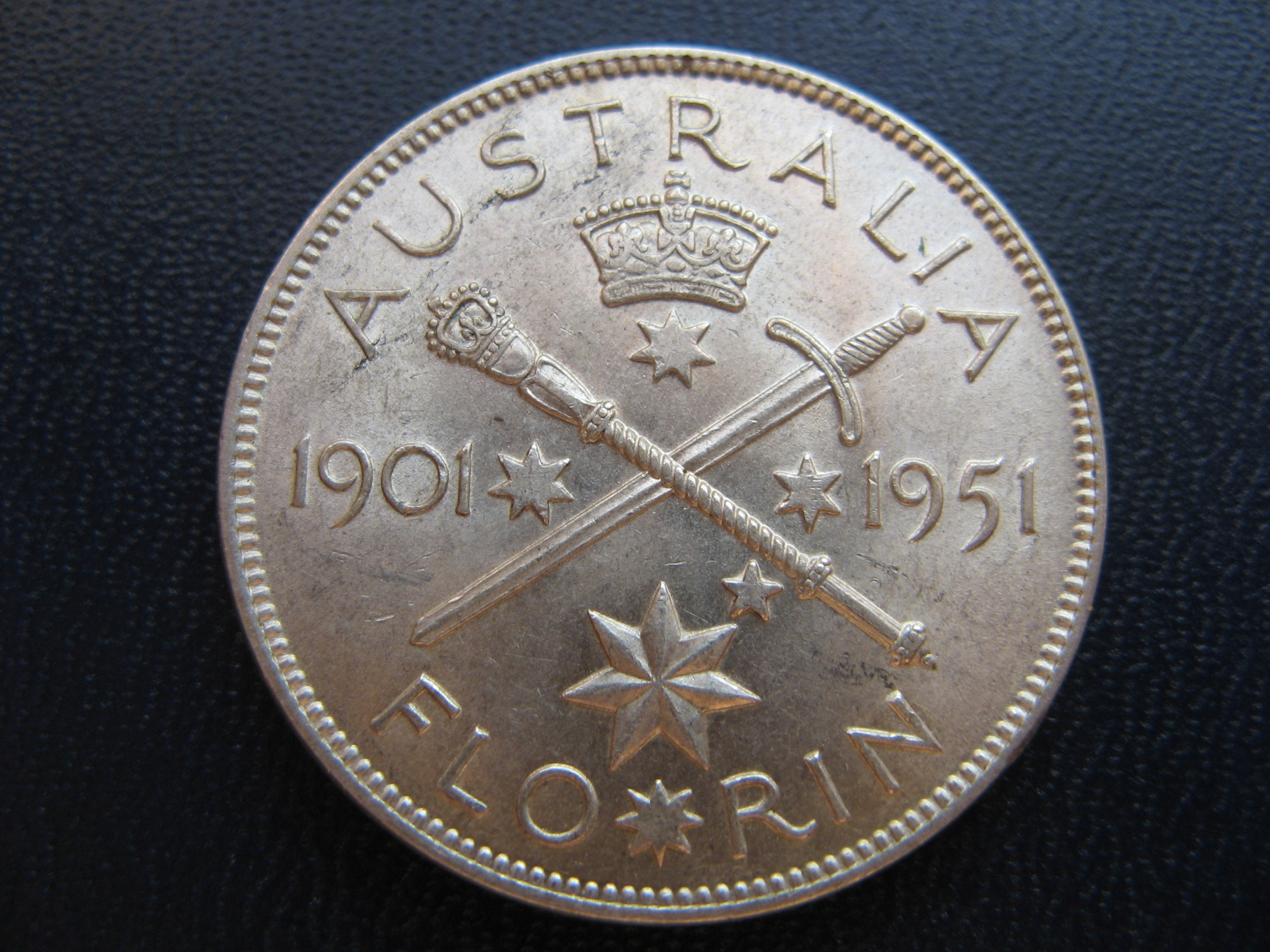
1951 Australian florin commemorating 50 years of the Commonwealth of Australia

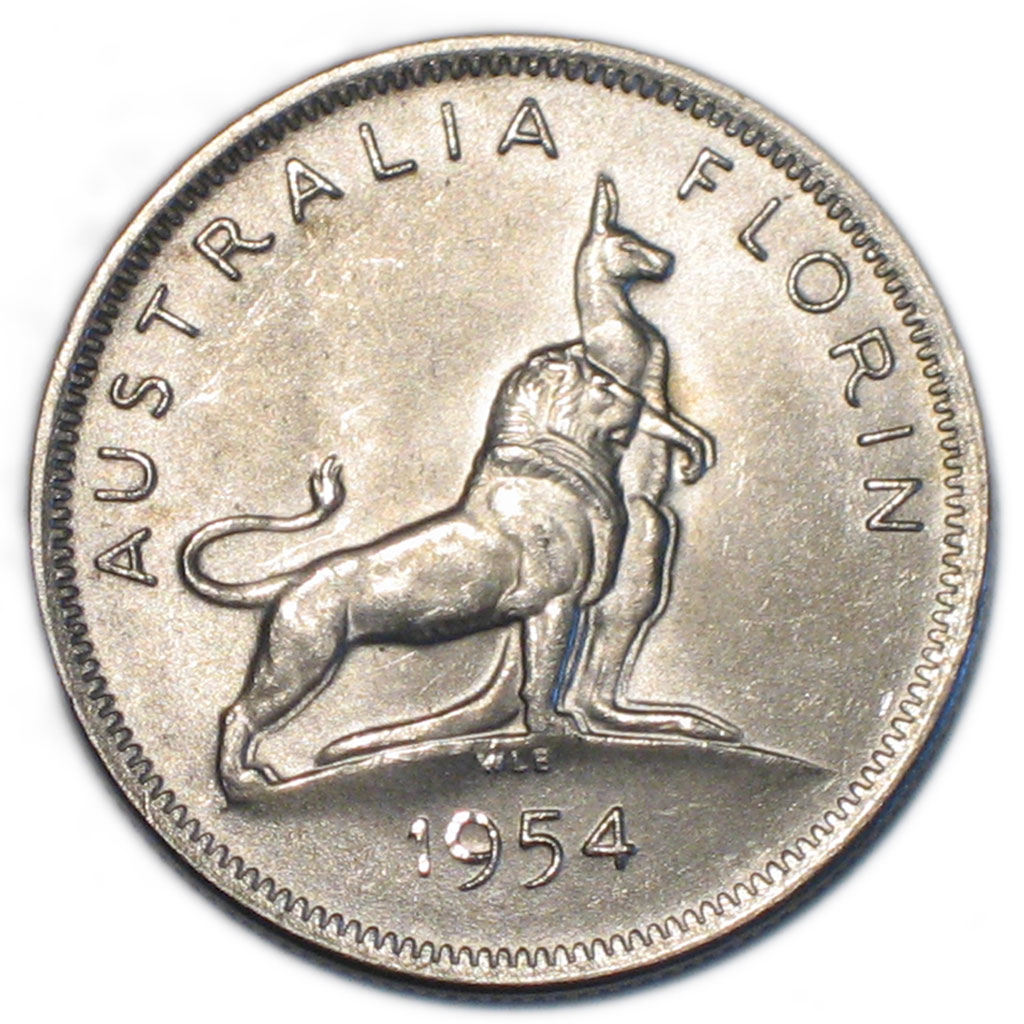
1954 Australian florin struck to commemorate the visit to Australia of Queen Elizabeth II on 3 Feb 1954
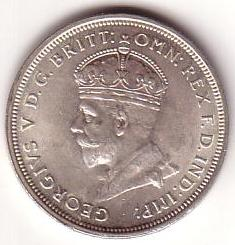
The obverse of the commemorative 1927 Australian florin, with
King George V

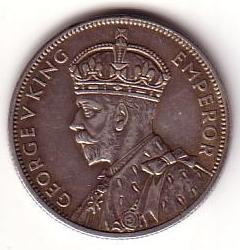
The obverse of the commemorative 1934-35 Australian florin

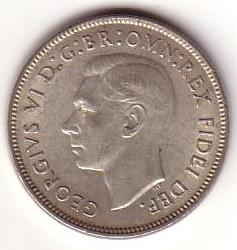
The obverse of the commemorative 1951 Australian florin, with
King George VI

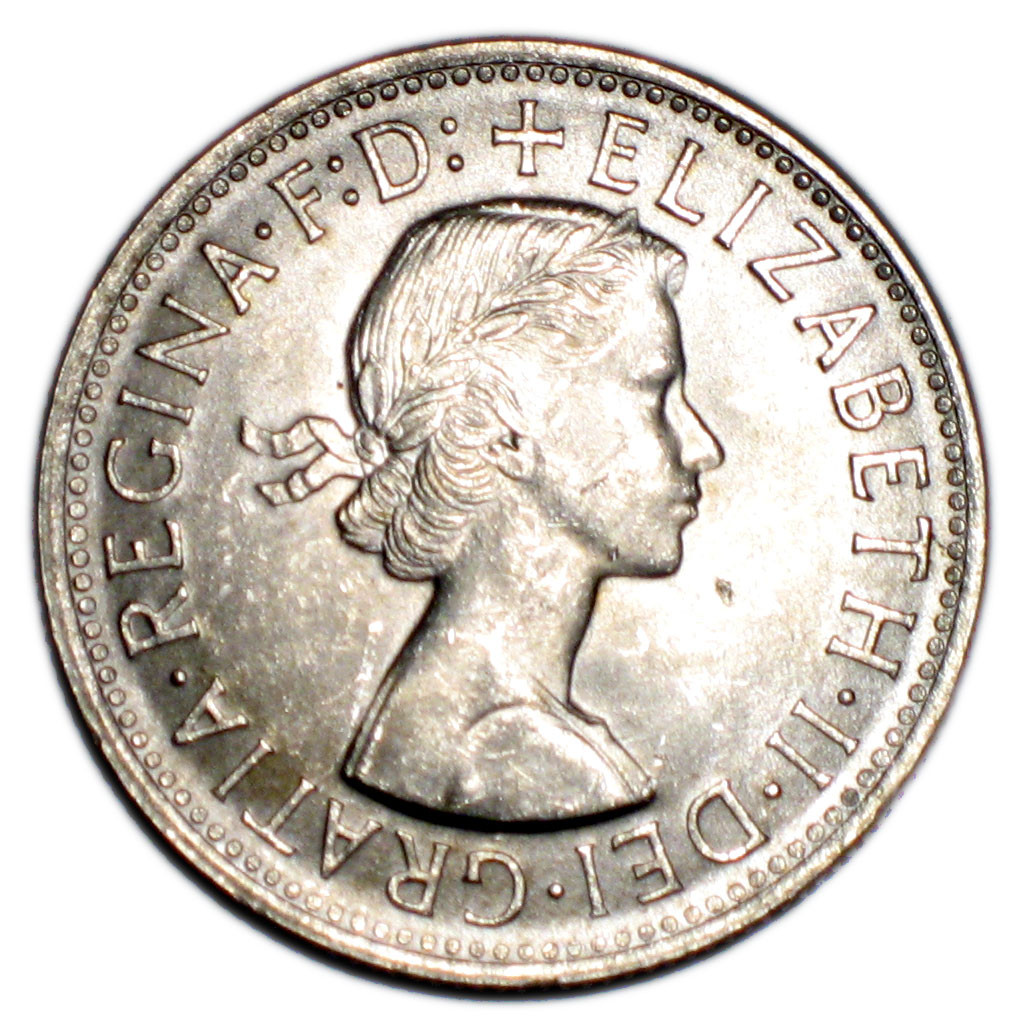
The obverse of the commemorative 1954 Australian florin, with Queen Elizabeth II

== General references ==
- Ian W. Pitt, ed. (2000). Renniks Australian Coin and Banknote Values (19th ed.). Chippendale, N.S.W.: Renniks Publications. ISBN 0-9585574-4-6.
- Krause, Chester L.; Clifford Mishler (2003). Colin R. Bruce II (ed.). 2004 Standard Catalog of World Coins: 1901–Present (31st ed.). Krause Publications. ISBN 0873495934.
