= Threepence (Australian coin) =

Australian pre-decimalisation coin

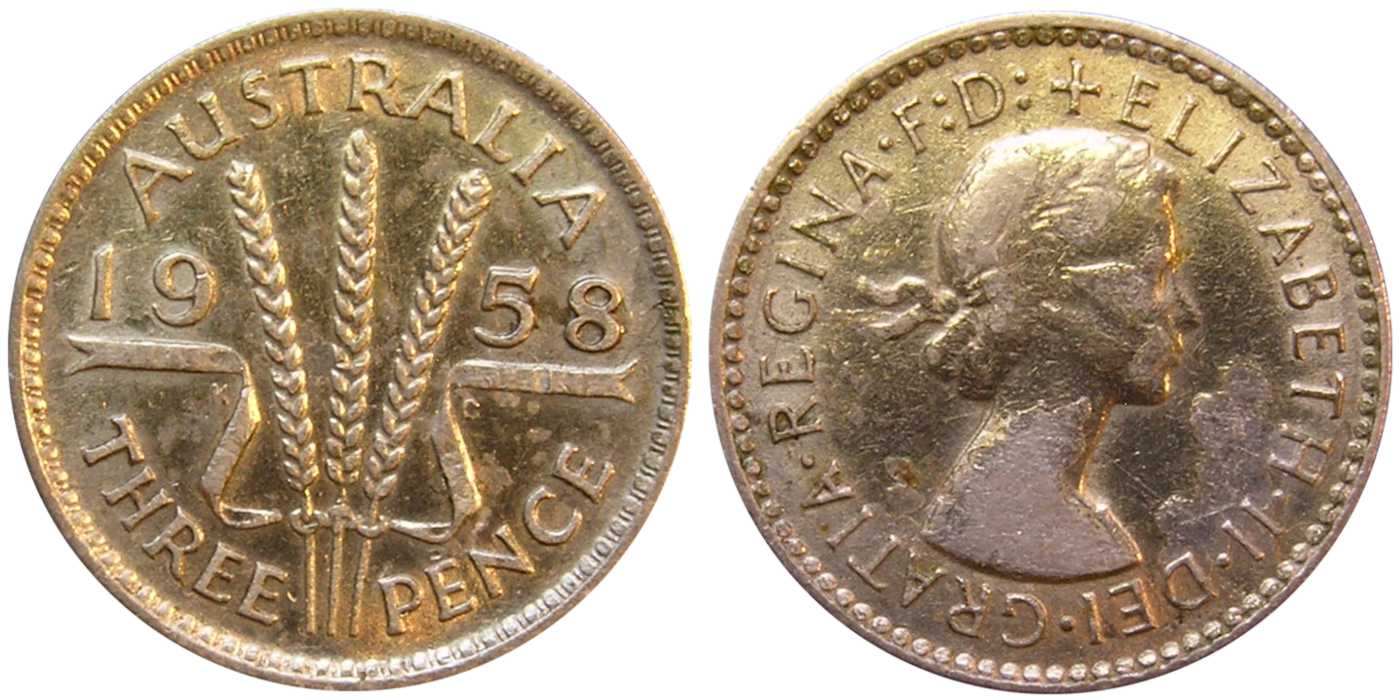
Reverse and obverse of threepence coin of 1958 (approximately actual size)

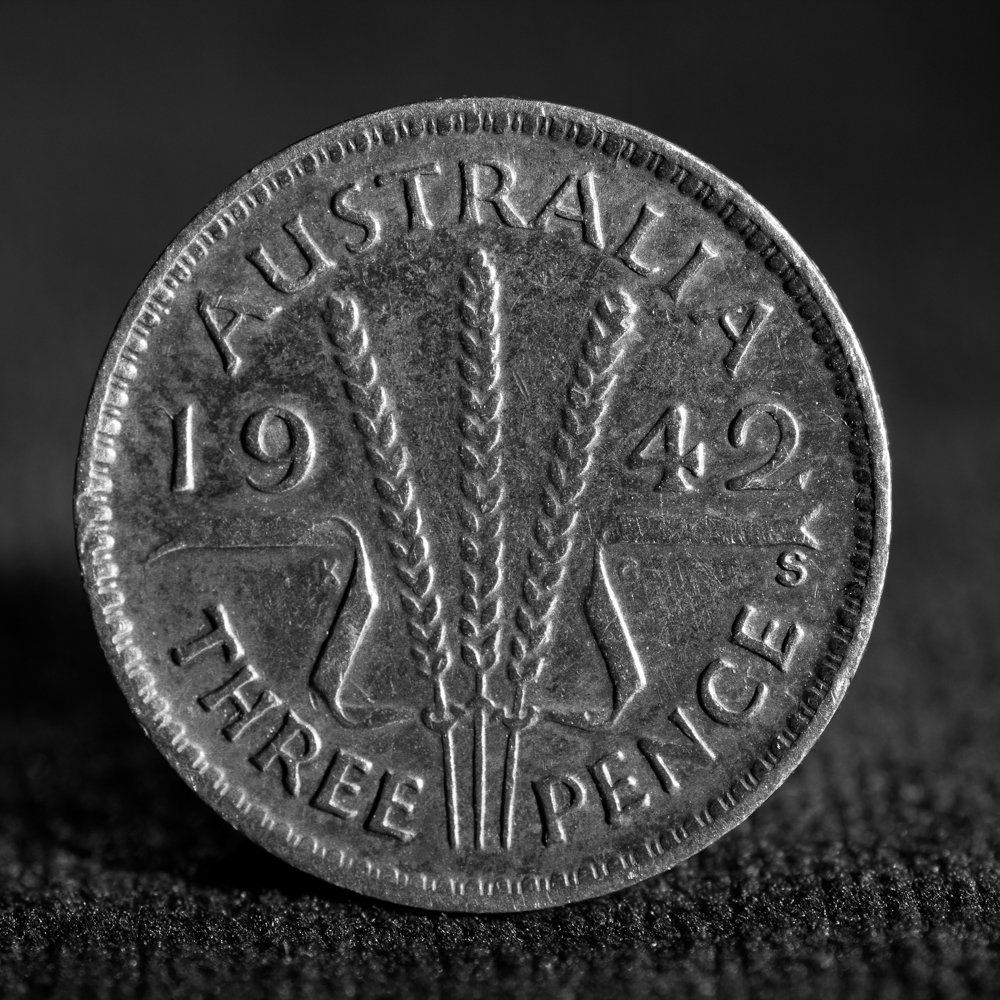
A 1942 Australian threepence (reverse) minted in San Francisco

The Australian threepence (pron. "thrippence"), commonly referred to as the "threepenny bit", is a small silver coin used in the Commonwealth of Australia prior to decimalisation. It was minted from 1910 until 1964, excluding 1913, 1929–1933 inclusive, 1937, 1945 and 1946. After decimalisation on 14 February 1966, the coin was equivalent to 2 1/2c, but was rapidly withdrawn from circulation.

During World War II, threepence production was supplemented by coinage produced by the United States Mint at the San Francisco and Denver mints. Coins minted at the San Francisco mint from 1942 to 1944 contain a small capital S on the reverse, while coins produced at the Denver mint from 1942 to 1943 have a small capital D on the reverse.

== Types ==
Image		Years		Technical parameters				Description / Legend / Designer		
Obverse	Reverse	From	To	Diameter	Thickness	Mass	Composition	Edge	Obverse	Reverse
		1910	1910	16 mm		1.41 g	92.5% silver, 7.5% copper	Plain	Edward VII; EDWARDVS VII D:G: BRITT. OMN: REX F: D: IND: IMP: by George William de Saulles	Coat of arms of Australia; THREEPENCE by W.H.J. Blakemore
		1911	1936						George V GEORGIVS V D.G.BRITT: OMN: REX F.D.IND:IMP: by Bertram Mackennal	
		1938	1944						George VI; GEORGIVS VI D:G:BR:OMN:REX: F:D:IND:IMP. by Thomas Hugh Paget	3 stalks of grain AUSTRALIA THREE PENCE by George Kruger Gray (K G under ribbon)
		1947	1948				50% silver, 40% copper, 5% nickel, 5% zinc			
		1949	1952						George VI; GEORGIVS VI D:G:BR:OMN:REX FIDEI DEF. by Thomas Hugh Paget	
		1953	1954						Elizabeth II + ELIZABETH.II.DEI.GRATIA.REGINA by Mary Gillick	
		1955	1964						Elizabeth II + ELIZABETH.II.DEI.GRATIA.REGINA.F:D: by Mary Gillick	
These images are to scale at 2.5 pixels per millimetre. For table standards, see the coin specification table.

== Mintmarks ==
- D : Denver
- M : Melbourne
- PL : London
- S : San Francisco

== See also ==
- Halfpenny (Australian coin)
- Penny (Australian coin)
- Sixpence (Australian coin)
- Shilling (Australian coin)
- Florin (Australian coin)

Preceded by Threepence (British)	Threepence; 1910–1966	Succeeded by Denomination abolished
