= Halfpenny (Australian coin) =

Australian pre-decimal coin

- Australia
- Value: 1/480 pound (pre-decimal); 5/12¢ (when decimalised)
- Mass: 5.67 g
- Diameter: 25.5 mm
- Thickness: 1.5 mm
- Edge: Plain
- Composition: Bronze: 97% Cu,2.5% Zn, 0.5% Sn
- Years of minting: 1911–1964

Obverse
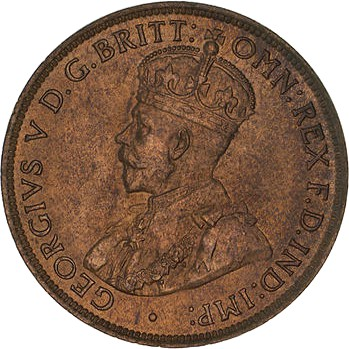
- Design: George V GEORGIVS V D.G.BRITT: OMN: REX F.D.IND:IMP
- Designer: Bertram Mackennal
- Design date: 1911
- Design discontinued: 1938

Reverse
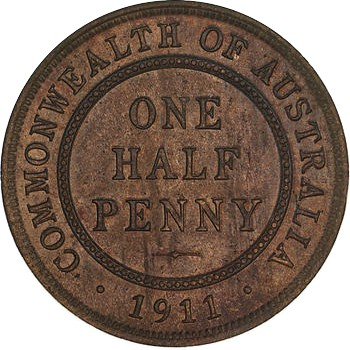
- Design: ONE HALF PENNY COMMONWEALTH OF AUSTRALIA
- Designer: W.H.J. Blakemore
- Design date: 1911
- Design discontinued: 1939

The Australian pre-decimal halfpenny coin, commonly known as a ha’penny (pronounced /ˈheɪpəni/), was the smallest denomination of the Australian Pound in circulation.

It was a unit of currency that equalled half of a penny, 1/24 of a shilling, or 1/480 of a pound. The coin was made to be equivalent to the British halfpenny; its dimensions, composition and values were equivalent, and additionally, the two currencies were fixed at par.

The coin was first introduced in 1911, and minting ceased in 1965 with the introduction of the decimal system. When decimalisation occurred on 14 February 1966, the coin value was made equivalent to 5/12 of a cent (= 0.41666 c).

The obverse of the coin featured the current reigning monarch of Australia (excluding 1936 when Edward VIII was King). Three monarchs were featured; King George V, King George VI, and Queen Elizabeth II. All halfpennies produced with George VI and Elizabeth II had the Kangaroo Reverse.

Australian Halfpennies were minted at different locations, nationally and internationally, over the years from 1911 to 1964. Within Australia, halfpennies were minted in Melbourne, Perth and Sydney. Internationally, they were minted in India (Calcutta and Bombay), and England (London and Birmingham), each signified by different mint marks.

== History ==
=== King George V (1911–1936) ===
George V became King of the United Kingdom in 1910 after the death of King Edward VII. Subsequently, coins minted for Australia by the Royal Mint, London, dated 1911, were altered on the obverse only. Bronze halfpennies (and pennies) were issued for the first time this year.

Australian halfpennies depicting George V feature him robed and crowned on the obverse, facing to the left and from bust up. The effigy of George V used is known to "grace the vast majority of Australia’s rarest and most desirable Commonwealth coins."

The reverse during this time consisted of the words "ONE HALF PENNY" in three lines at the centre, surrounded by a beaded circle. A small scroll is located under the word "PENNY" within the beaded circle, and the legend "COMMONWEALTH OF AUSTRALIA" with the issued date surrounding the circle of beads. Depending on the place of mintage, certain coins could also contain a small mintmark located under the scroll.

In 1916, during minting of Australian halfpennies in Kolkata, an extremely rare error coin was produced in which a coin blank with a halfpenny reverse and an Indian quarter anna obverse was struck. The error came to light in 1965, and around 7 to 9 are known to exist.

In 1936, Edward VIII was crowned as king from 20 January, until he abdicated that same year, on 11 December. However, during this year, all Australian coins continued to bear the bust of George V.

=== King George VI (1938–1952) ===
On 11 December 1936, George VI came to the throne on the abdication of Edward VIII.

In the first few years of his reign, the halfpenny continued to use the "Commonwealth of Australia" design. However, In 1939, there were two different types of the reverse struck—one of the previous "Commonwealth of Australia" design reverse, and the other with a new Kangaroo reverse, which had started appearing on the reverse of pennies a few years prior. 1939 halfpennies with the Kangaroo reverse are considerably rarer than the "Commonwealth of Australia" reverse.

Throughout George VI's reign, different years of halfpennies were struck in different places. In 1942 and 1943, Australian halfpennies were struck in Melbourne and Bombay. From 1944 to 1951, the Melbourne and Perth Mints were charged with striking halfpennies. In 1951, the Royal Mint in London struck halfpennies with the mintmark "PL" used to signify this. In 1952, halfpennies were solely struck by the Perth mint, with a dot after the word "Australia" to symbolise this.

=== Queen Elizabeth II (1953–1964) ===
From 1953 to 1964, the Perth Mint struck all of Australia's halfpennies, excluding 1959 (when they were struck by the Melbourne Mint). In 1953, the Perth Mint situated a mintmark dot after "Australia", whereas from 1960 to 1964, they placed the dot after the word "halfpenny".

== Types ==
Image		Years		Technical parameters				Description / Legend / Designer		
Obverse	Reverse	From	To	Diameter	Thickness	Mass	Composition	Edge	Obverse	Reverse
		1911	1936	25.4	1.5	5.67	Bronze: Cu 97%, Zn 2.5%, Sn 0.5%	Plain	George V GEORGIVS V D.G.BRITT: OMN: REX F.D.IND:IMP: by Bertram Mackennal	ONE HALF PENNY COMMONWEALTH OF AUSTRALIA by W.H.J. Blakemore
		1938	1939	25.5	1.5	5.67	Bronze: Cu 97%, Zn 2.5%, Sn 0.5%	Plain	George VI; GEORGIVS VI D:G:BR:OMN:REX: F:D:IND:IMP. by Thomas Hugh Paget	ONE HALF PENNY COMMONWEALTH OF AUSTRALIA by W.H.J. Blakemore
		1939	1948	25.5	1.5	5.67	Bronze: Cu 97%, Zn 2.5%, Sn 0.5%	Plain	George VI; GEORGIVS VI D:G:BR:OMN:REX: F:D:IND:IMP. by Thomas Hugh Paget	Kangaroo / Commonwealth Star; AUSTRALIA HALF PENNY by George Kruger Gray
		1949	1952	25.5	1.5	5.67	Bronze: Cu 97%, Zn 2.5%, Sn 0.5%	Plain	George VI; GEORGIVS VI D:G:BR:OMN:REX FIDEI DEF. by Thomas Hugh Paget	Kangaroo / Commonwealth Star; AUSTRALIA HALF PENNY by George Kruger Gray
		1953	1955	25.5	1.5	5.67	Bronze: Cu 97%, Zn 2.5%, Sn 0.5%	Plain	Elizabeth II + ELIZABETH.II.DEI.GRATIA.REGINA by Mary Gillick	Kangaroo / Commonwealth Star; AUSTRALIA HALF PENNY by George Kruger Gray
		1959	1964	25.5	1.5	5.67	Bronze: Cu 97%, Zn 2.5%, Sn 0.5%	Plain	Elizabeth II + ELIZABETH.II.DEI.GRATIA.REGINA.F:D: by Mary Gillick	Kangaroo / Commonwealth Star; AUSTRALIA HALF PENNY by George Kruger Gray
These images are to scale at 2.5 pixels per millimetre. For table standards, see the coin specification table.

== Mint and mintage by year ==
Counting the known mintages of proofs, a total of 422,882,890 (422 million) coins of the denomination were minted during its circulation.

Year	Mint	Mint Mark	Mintage (million)	Rarity	Notes
1911	London		2.83	Common	
1912	Ralph Heaton Birmingham	H under scroll	2.40	Common	
1913	London	Date variations	2.16	Common	
1914	London		1.44	Common	
	Ralph Heaton Birmingham	H under scroll	1.20	Common	
1915	Ralph Heaton Birmingham	H under scroll	0.72	Common	
1916	Calcutta	I under scroll	3.60	Common	
	Calcutta	I under scroll	5 known specimens recorded	Extremely rare	Mule
1917	Calcutta	I under scroll	5.76	Common	
1918	Calcutta	I under scroll	1.44	Common	
1919	Sydney		3.32	Common	
1920	Sydney		4.11	Common	
1921	Sydney		5.28	Common	
1922	Sydney		6.92	Common	
1923	Melbourne		0.015	Scarce	
1924	Melbourne		0.68	Common	
1925	Melbourne		1.14	Common	
1926	Melb & Syd		4.13	Common	
1927	Melbourne		3.07	Common	
1928	Melbourne		2.31	Common	
1929	Melbourne		2.63	Common	
1930	Melbourne		0.63	Common	
1931	Melbourne		0.36	Common	
1932	Melbourne		2.55	Common	
1933	Melbourne		34.61	Common	
1934	Melbourne		3.81	Common	
1935	Melbourne		2.91	Common	
1936	Melbourne		5.57	Common	
1938	Melbourne		5.17	Common	
1939	Melbourne		4.67	Common	
	Melbourne		0.78	Scarce	Kangaroo type reverse introduced
1940	Melbourne		1.72	Common	
1941	Melbourne		5.3	Common	
1942	Melbourne		1.0	Scarce	
	Perth	Dot after Y	4.33	Common	
	Bombay	I below bust	6.0	Common	
	Bombay	I below bust	UNKNOWN	Rare	Tall denticles, dropped last 'A' of AUSTRALIA
1943	Melbourne		41.02	Common	
	Bombay	I below bust	6.0	Common	
1944	Melbourne		0.72	Common	
1945	Perth	Y.	3.49	Common	
	Perth		Included above	Common	No dot
1946	Perth	Y.	13.37	Common	
1947	Perth	Y.	10.72	Common	
1948	Melbourne		4.59	Common	
	Perth	Y.	25.55	Common	
1949	Perth	Y.	20.21	Common	
1950	Perth	Y.	10.51	Common	
1951	London	PL	6.96	Common	
	Ralph Heaton Birmingham		29.42	Common	
	Perth	Y.	Included above	Common	
	Perth		UNKNOWN	Scarce	No dot
1952	Perth	Y.	1.83	Common	
1953	Perth	A.	23.96	Common	
1954	Perth	Y.	21.96	Common	
1955	Perth		9.34	Common	
1959	Melbourne		11.19	Common	
	Perth	Y.	Included above	Common	
1960	Perth	Y.	16.78	Common	
1961	Perth	Y.	24.36	Common	
1962	Perth	Y.	16.41	Common	
1963	Perth	Y.	16.41	Common	
1964	Perth	Y.	18.23	Common	

Above tabulated information derived from, and corroborated between sources.

== Numismatics ==
=== 1916I Mule ~ valued up to AUD $100,000 – $125,000 ===
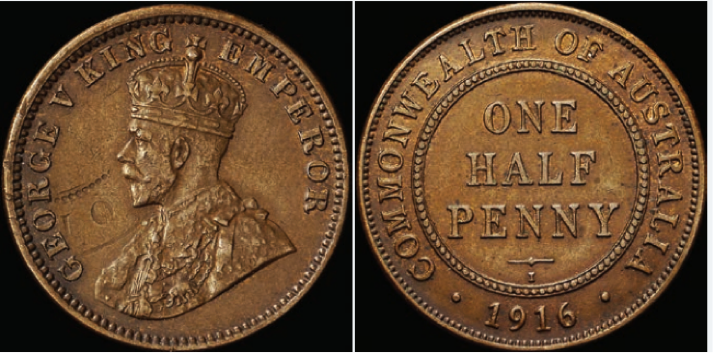
1916I Mule Halfpenny (Obverse 2; Reverse A). NGC graded AU Details BN

The 1916I Mule carries the standard Australian reverse for halfpennies of 1916, however, it is distinguishable by its obverse, which is that of an Indian quarter anna coin. It is Australia's rarest Commonwealth coin issued for circulation, and when its significance was first recognised in the Australian numismatic press in the mid 1960s, it was described as the "biggest find in coin history, and one of the most valuable." There are currently 5 known specimens in existence, and it is predicted that there are 6–10 examples in existence.

The historical context of how the Indian Quarter Anna obverse came onto 1916 Halfpenny, is that during World War I the Royal Mint of London assigned the production of a range of Australian coins to the Calcutta Mint, with the reason for this change being that there were allay concerns that the German Navy could have the ability to intercept or sink maritime deliveries of coinage from Britain to Australia. This would not have only had the consequence of expense, but would have also been morale-shattering in a time of great need. The 1916 Australian halfpenny and penny were the first non-Indian coins to be produced by the Royal Mint's Calcutta branch.

The Calcutta Mint had been successfully producing copper Annas and silver Rupees since 1862, so the mint had the resources, systems and experience to produce this new coin. It is still subject to debate how the error of the 1916I Mule Halfpenny came into existence.

This coin, like any numismatic item, is sought after by collectors for a variety of reasons. It appeals to collectors for its rarity, being a crucial component in creating a truly complete Australian Commonwealth coin set, its historical numismatic significance, and being topic of continued debate.

=== 1923 ~ valued up to AUD $75,000 – $100,000 ===
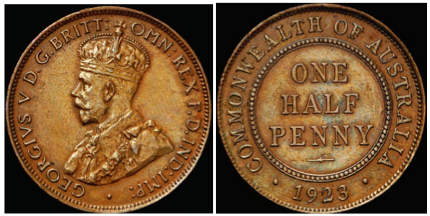
1923 Halfpenny (Obverse 1; Reverse A). NGC graded MS 62 BN.

In 1922, the Royal Mint’s Sydney Branch manufactured sixpence and halfpenny coins for the Commonwealth. These coins were produced using dies supplied from the Melbourne Mint. In 1923, the future of the Sydney Mint was uncertain (eventually closing in 1926) which led to 1923 dies not being sent to Sydney, leaving the entire issues from Sydney for that year—some 1,113,600 coins—being struck baring the incorrect date of 1922. This meant that in July 1923, the Melbourne Mint received an order to produce £1000 of halfpenny coins (equating to 480,000 coins).

Three pairs of 1923 dies were issued from the Melbourne workshop in September of that year. However, all three of these dies failed in early stages—one was immediately returned to the workshop for amendments, and the remaining two cracked early in production. This resulted in the rarity of 1923 halfpenny coins. 1923 halfpennies can now fetch up to several thousand dollars.

=== 1939 ~ valued up to AUD $25,000 – $35,000 ===
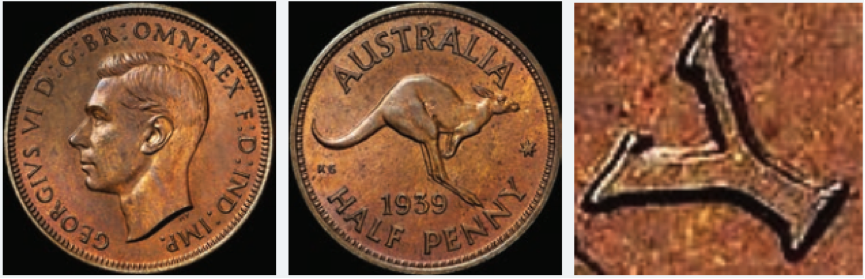
1939 "Roo" Halfpenny. (Obverse 3; Reverse B). NGC graded MS 65 BN

In 1939, the first halfpenny coins continued to be produced with the long-standing "•COMMONWEALTH OF AUSTRALIA•" which had held since their first introduction 1911. However, later that year the reverse changed to a scaled-down and horizontally inverted version of the penny Kangaroo reverse, which was introduced the previous year in 1938. Furthermore, there were two observably distinct reverse Kangaroo dies on the (then) new 1939 halfpennies—one from the original London die master and the second from the Melbourne Mint.

There are a number of features on the 1939 Kangaroo reverse coins that allow the two types to be distinguished. The most notable difference in marking is observable when comparing the foot of the "Y" in "HALFPENNY"—the rarer of which presents a double foot, while the more common version displays a single foot. The Australian Numismatic Dealers Association regards the double foot 1939 halfpenny as an "extremely rare coin in uncirculated condition."

Preceded by Halfpenny (British)	Halfpenny; 1911–1966	Succeeded by Denomination abolished
