= Florin (Australian coin) =

Pre-decimalisation coin (1910–1966)

The Australian florin was a coin used in the Commonwealth of Australia before decimalisation in 1966. The florin was worth two shillings (24 pence, or one-tenth of a pound). The denomination was first minted in 1910 to the same size and weight as the British florin.

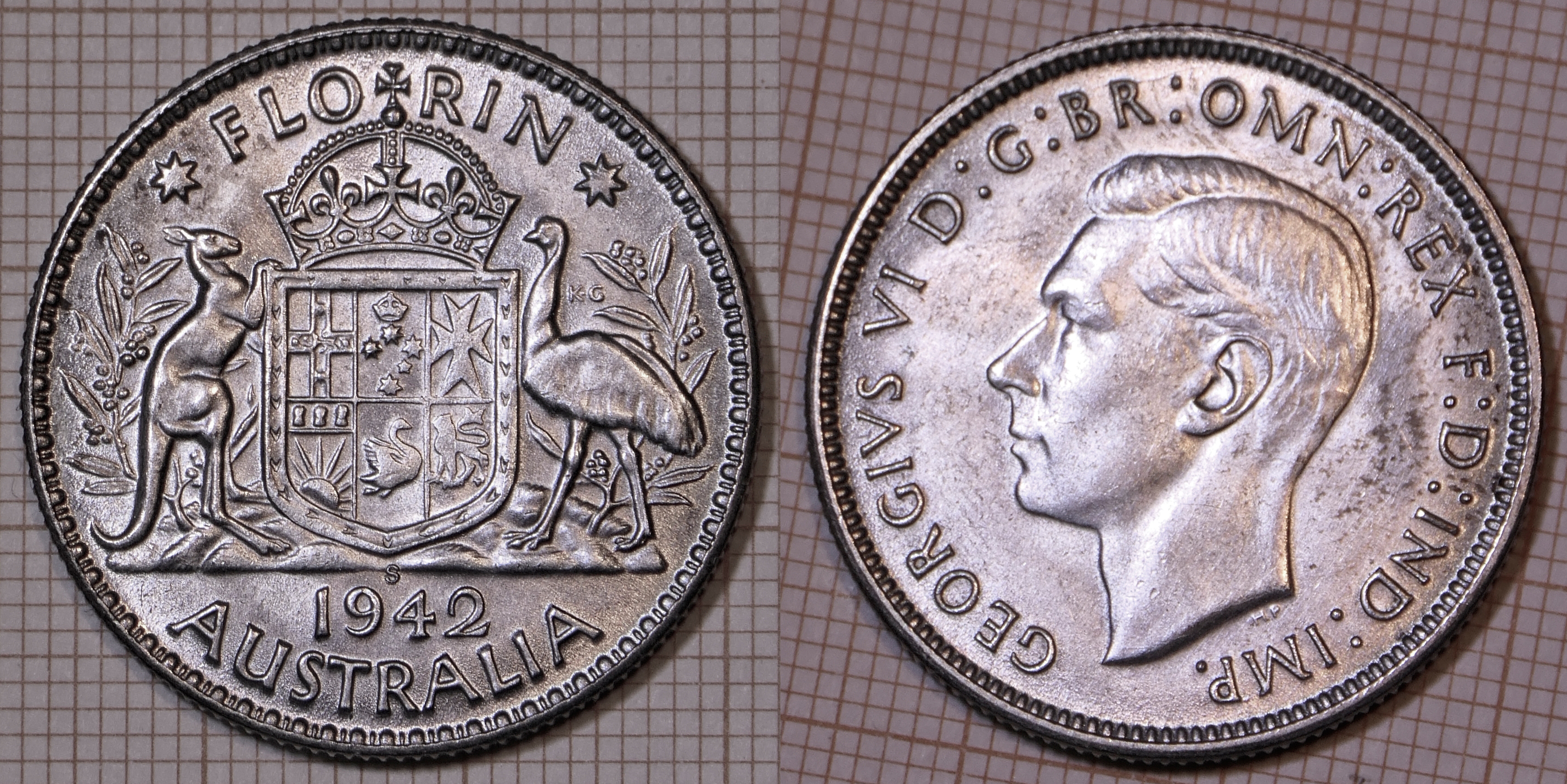
1942 S florin minted during the reign of George VI, showing the last common reverse design for Australian florins.

Florins minted from 1910 to 1945 were produced with a .925 sterling silver content, weighing 11.31 grams (0.3636 troy ounces) with an actual silver weight (ASW) of 10.46 grams (0.3363 ozt). Florins minted from 1946 to 1963 were produced with a .500 silver content (50% silver), weighing 11.31 grams with an ASW of 5.65 g (0.1818 ozt). The coin was minted until 1963, with some years omitted: no florins were minted in 1920, 1929–30, 1937, 1948–50 and 1955. Also, commemorative florins were issued for the following years: 1927, 1934–35, 1951, and 1954. Two different designs were issued in each of the commemorative years (the "regular" approved issue plus the specially approved memorial designs). Also, no coins of any denomination were issued in 1965, as all minting was shut down in preparation for decimalisation. During World War II, between 1942 and 1944, florin production was supplemented by coinage produced at the San Francisco branch of the United States Mint. These coins bear a small "S" mint mark below the Australian coat of arms.

The image on the reverse of the coin was the coat of arms of Australia (except for commemorative coins). This comes in two forms, all with the kangaroo, emu and the shield containing the coat of arms. Those issued between 1910 and 1936 have a seven-pointed star above the coat of arms, and the Southern Cross constellation within the shield. Those issued between 1938 and 1963, inclusive, have the royal crown above, the six states represented in the shield and a golden wattle plant as a background. When Australia decimalised officially, on 14 February 1966, the florin was equal to 20 cents.

== Circulation types ==
Image		Years		Technical parameters				Description / Legend / Designer		
Obverse	Reverse	From	To	Diameter	Thickness	Mass	Composition	Edge	Obverse	Reverse
		1910	1910	28.5 mm	2.5 mm	11.31 g	92.5% silver 7.5% copper	Reeded	Edward VII; EDWARDVS VII D:G: BRITT. OMN: REX F: D: IND: IMP: by George William de Saulles	1908 coat of arms of Australia (with ADVANCE AUSTRALIA on ribbon); ONE FLORIN - TWO SHILLINGS by William Henry James Blakemore
		1911	1936	28.5 mm	2.5 mm	11.31 g	92.5% silver 7.5% copper	Reeded	George V GEORGIVS V D.G.BRITT: OMN: REX F.D.IND:IMP: by Bertram Mackennal	1908 coat of arms of Australia (with ADVANCE AUSTRALIA on ribbon); ONE FLORIN - TWO SHILLINGS by William Henry James Blakemore
		1938	1945	28.5 mm	2.5 mm	11.31 g	92.5% silver 7.5% copper	Reeded	George VI; GEORGIVS VI D:G:BR:OMN:REX: F:D:IND:IMP. by Thomas Hugh Paget	Coat of arms of Australia below an imperial crown * FLORIN * AUSTRALIA by George Kruger Gray
		1946	1947	28.5 mm	2.5 mm	11.31 g	50.0% silver, 40.0% copper, 5.0% nickel, 5.0% zinc	Reeded	George VI; GEORGIVS VI D:G:BR:OMN:REX: F:D:IND:IMP. by Thomas Hugh Paget	Coat of arms of Australia below an imperial crown * FLORIN * AUSTRALIA by George Kruger Gray
		1951	1952	28.5 mm	2.5 mm	11.31 g	50.0% silver, 40.0% copper, 5.0% nickel, 5.0% zinc	Reeded	George VI GEORGIVS VI D:G:BR:OMN:REX FIDEI DEF. by Thomas Hugh Paget	Coat of arms of Australia below an imperial crown * FLORIN * AUSTRALIA by George Kruger Gray
		1953	1954	28.5 mm	2.5 mm	11.31 g	50.0% silver, 40.0% copper, 5.0% nickel, 5.0% zinc	Reeded	Elizabeth II + ELIZABETH.II.DEI.GRATIA.REGINA by Mary Gillick	Coat of arms of Australia below an imperial crown * FLORIN * AUSTRALIA by George Kruger Gray
		1956	1963	28.5 mm	2.5 mm	11.31 g	50.0% silver, 40.0% copper, 5.0% nickel, 5.0% zinc	Reeded	Elizabeth II + ELIZABETH.II.DEI.GRATIA.REGINA.F:D: by Mary Gillick	Coat of arms of Australia below an imperial crown * FLORIN * AUSTRALIA by George Kruger Gray

== Commemorative florins ==
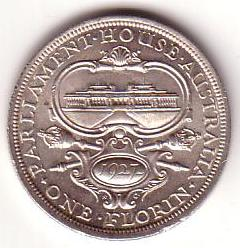
Reverse of the 1927 Australian florin commemorating the opening of the original Parliament House. Designed by George Kruger Gray.

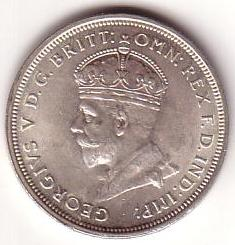
Obverse of the commemorative 1927 Australian florin, with
King George V. Designed by George Kruger Gray.
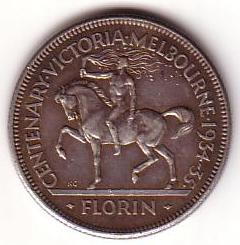
Reverse of the non-circulated 1934–35 Australian florin commemorating the centenary of Melbourne, capital of Victoria. Designed by George Kruger Gray.

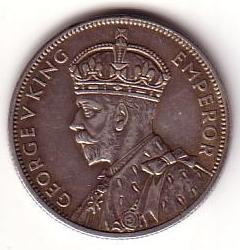
Obverse of the commemorative 1934–35 Australian florin, with King George V, designed by Percy Metcalfe.
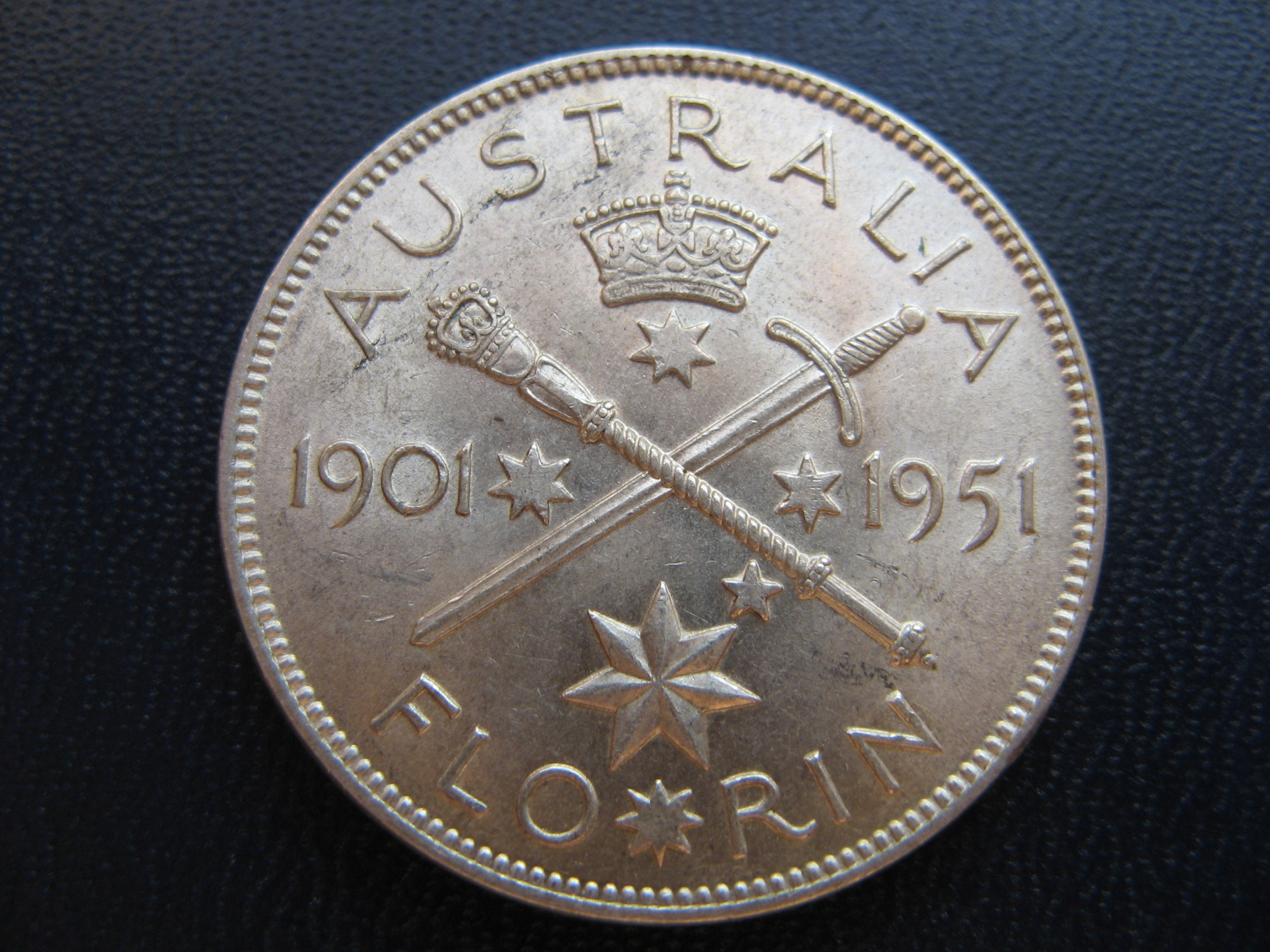
Reverse of the 1951 Australian florin commemorating the jubilee of Federation of Australia. Designed by William Leslie Bowles.

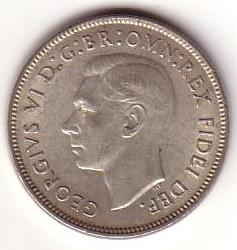
Obverse of the 1951 Australian florin, with King George VI, designed by Thomas Humphrey Paget.
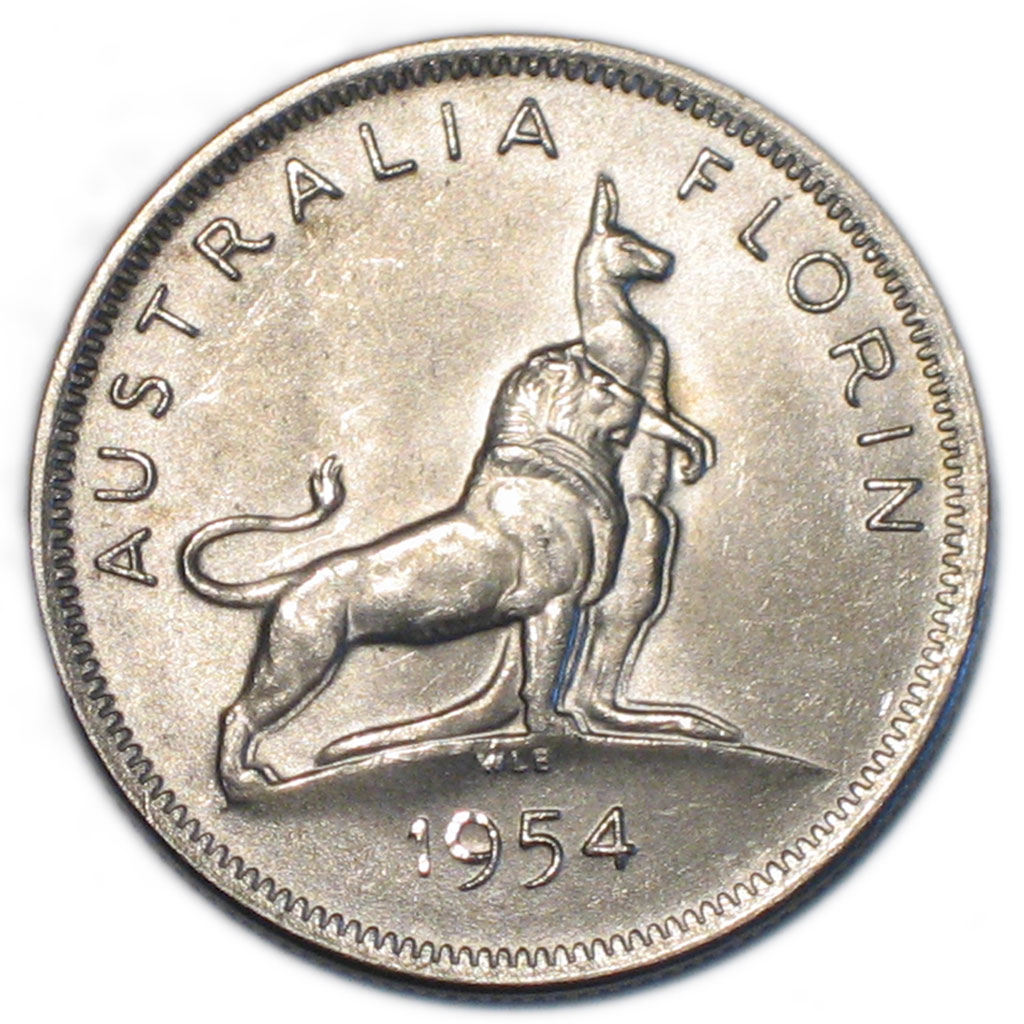
Reverse of the 1954 Australian florin commemorating the first visit of a reigning monarch to Australia, designed by Leslie Bowles.

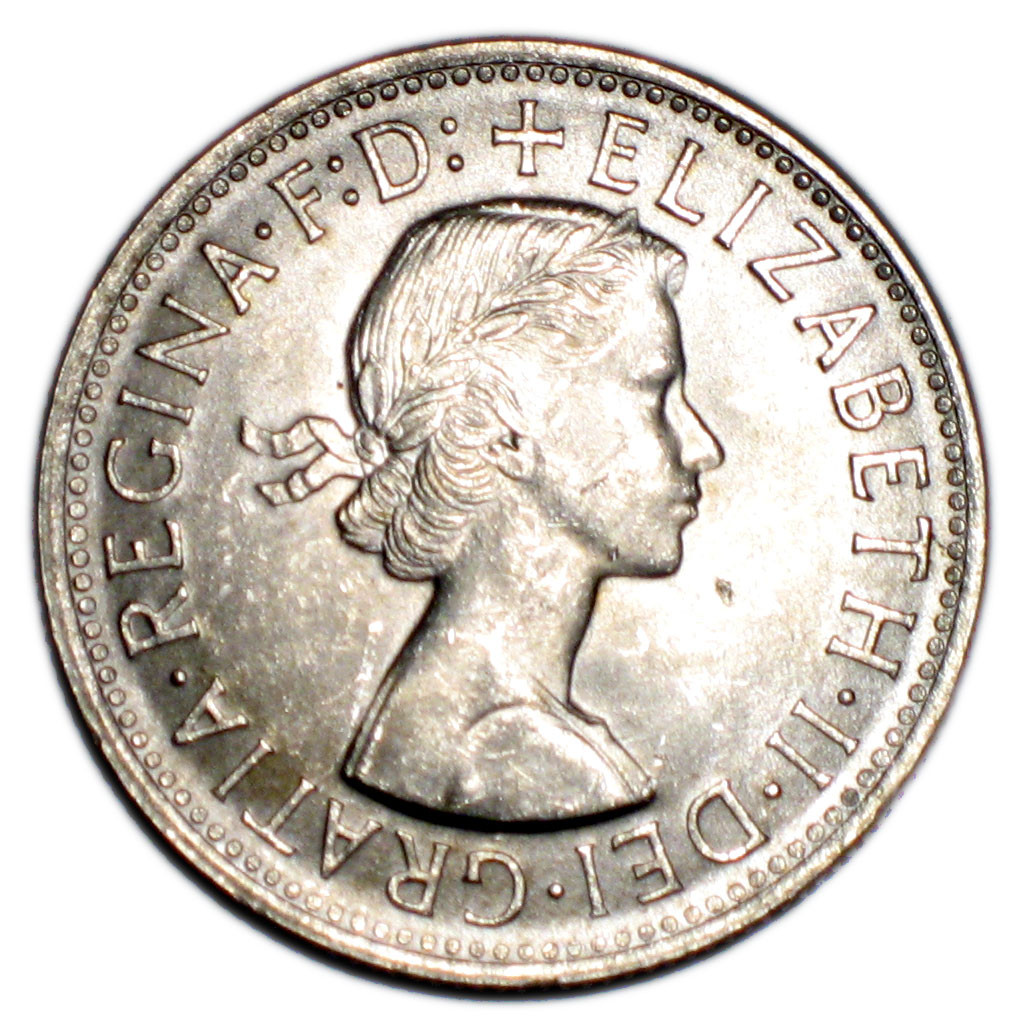
Obverse of the commemorative 1954 Australian florin, with Queen Elizabeth II, designed by Mary Gillick.

== Mintmarks ==
- H : Birmingham
- M : Melbourne
- S : San Francisco

Preceded by Florin (British)	Florin; 1910–1966	Succeeded by Twenty cent coin (Australian)
