= Byron Bay Record =

Defunct Australian weekly newspaper

The Byron Bay Record
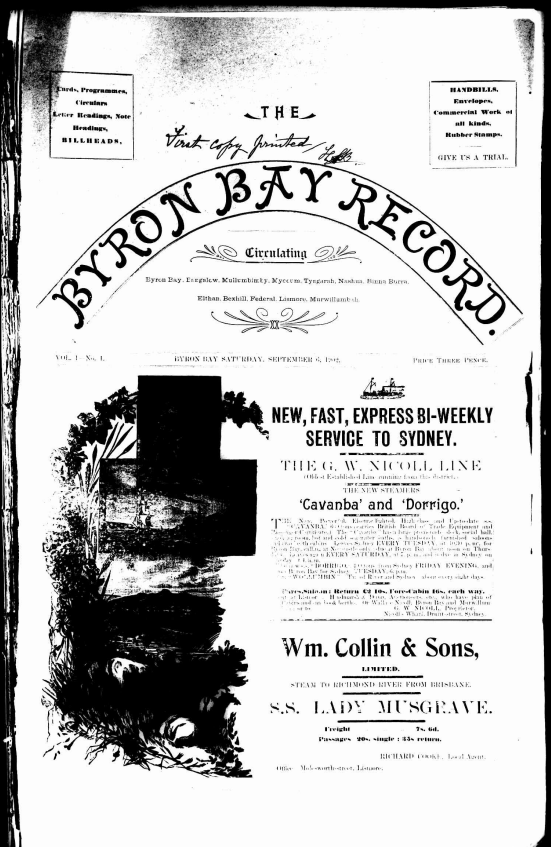
- The front page of The Byron Bay Record; Volume 1, Number 1 – 6 September 1902
- Type: Weekly newspaper
- Publisher: Alfred C. Burgess
- Editor: Alfred C. Burgess
- Founded: 6 September 1902 (123 years ago)
- Ceased publication: 12 April 1924 (102 years ago)
- Political alignment: Progressivism
- Headquarters: Byron Bay, New South Wales
- Country: Australia
- ISSN: 2201-5019
- Free online archives: trove.nla.gov.au

The Byron Bay Record was weekly newspaper published every Saturday in Byron Bay, New South Wales, Australia from 6 September 1902 until 12 April 1924.

== Overview ==
The Byron Bay Record was first published on 6 September 1902 by Alfred C. Burgess at his printing press office in Byron Bay. It was distributed weekly at a cost of 3d throughout the Northern Rivers region. The paper has been digitised on to Trove; an Australian library database aggregator owned by the National Library of Australia.
