= John Gray (archdeacon of Hong Kong) =

John Henry Gray (29 October 1823, in Carlisle – 17 March 1890, in St Leonards), a graduate from Christ's College, Cambridge, was the inaugural Archdeacon of Hong Kong, serving from 1868 until 1878. He was also a consular chaplain at Canton (also known as Guangzhou), 1867–78, and a commissary of the Diocese of Victoria, Hong Kong. He was Rector of Hunsdon, Hertfordshire, 1881–84.

He was best known for China: a History of the Laws, Manners and Customs of the People (2 volumes, Macmillan, 1878) and his various other books on Chinese society, norms and history, including Walks in The City of Canton, which meticulously depicted the life of Canton in the 1870s.

On 3 October 1876 in Hove, Sussex, he married Julia Cox (1838–1921) (who called him Henry), daughter of William Henry Cox, master printer, of London. They had two sons and two daughters (one of whom died in infancy). The surviving daughter married George Kruger Gray (1880–1943), notable heraldic artist. John Henry Gray died at St Leonards on Sea, Sussex.
