= Winifred Turner =

English sculptor and educator (1903–1983)

- Born: 13 March 1903; London, England
- Died: 30 October 1983 (aged 80); Burwash Common, Sussex England
- Education: Central School of Art and Design; Royal Academy Schools
- Known for: Sculpture
- Spouse: Humphrey Paget (m. 1942; died 1974)

Winifred Turner (married name Paget; 13 March 1903 – 30 October 1983) was an English sculptor and educator.

== Biography ==
Turner was born on 13 March 1903 in London to Alfred Turner, a sculptor, and Charlotte Ann Turner (née Gavin; c. 1880 – c. 1881–1938), who was of Irish decent. She studied at the Central School of Art and Design in London between 1921 and 1924, and then at Royal Academy Schools until 1929. She was elected a Fellow and Associate of the Royal Society of British Sculptors in 1930 and exhibited at the Royal Academy between 1924 and 1962. Turner taught at the Central School of Art in the 1930s and early 1940s. In 1988, the Ashmolean Museum in Oxford held a joint exhibition of works by Turner and her father, Alfred. Her 1934 bronze sculpture, Crouching Youth is in the collection of the Victoria and Albert Museum in London. The National Museum Cardiff also holds two works by Turner. The Yale Center for British Art holds Turner's sculpture Eve (1932).

In 1942, Turner married the sculptor and medallist Humphrey Paget. On 30 October 1983, Turner died in Burwash Common, Sussex aged 80.
