= Crown (Australian coin) =

Australian pre-decimal coin

- Australia
- Value: Five shillings
- Mass: 28.28 g
- Diameter: 38.5 mm
- Edge: Milled
- Composition: 92.5% silver, 7.5% copper
- Years of minting: 1937-1938

Obverse
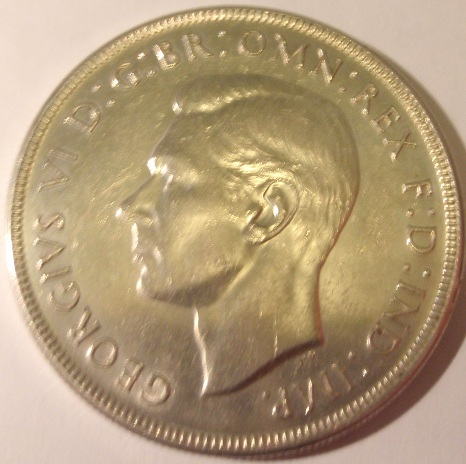
- Design: Head of George VI
- Designer: Thomas H. Paget

Reverse
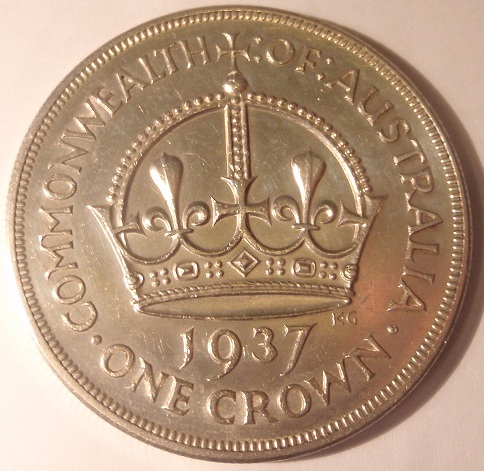
- Designer: George Kruger Gray

The Australian Crown was a coin used in the Commonwealth of Australia prior to decimalisation in 1966. The denomination was only minted in 1937 and 1938. It was of similar size and weight to the British crown and was made of sterling silver for both its years of production. Like the British Crown, the Australian Crown was worth five shillings (one-quarter of an Australian pound).

The Crown was originally intended to commemorate the ascension of King Edward VIII; however, due to his abdication, it was instead struck to commemorate the ascension of King George VI. It depicts St Edward's Crown. The Crown quickly lost its commemorative appeal and its lack of popularity led to its production being terminated. 1,008,000 Australian Crowns were minted in 1937 and 101,600 were minted in 1938, making the 1938 much more valuable today.
