= Dei Gratia Rex =

Phrase inscription on coins

Dei Gratia Rex (abbreviated as D. G. Rex) is a Latin title inscribed on coins meaning, By the Grace of God, King. The corresponding title for a queen is Dei Gratia Regina (abbreviated as D. G. Regina or D. G. Reg), meaning By the Grace of God, Queen.

This phrase is circumscribed on the obverse of many British and Canadian coins. The phrase, or some variation of it, has also been used on past coinage issued in Australia, Austria, Cyprus, Spain, and Sweden. In addition to coinage, the phrase is also used on the obverse side of some medals in the Commonwealth realms.

== History ==
=== Australia ===
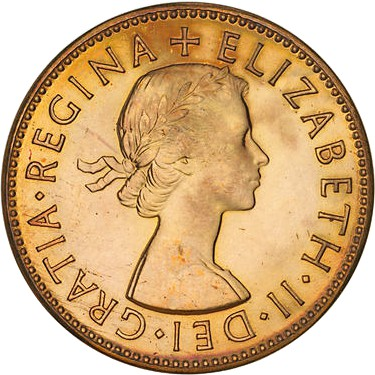
The phrase Dei Gratia Regina on an Australian half-penny (issued 1953). The phrase was used on Australian coins until 1964.

Australian coins included the phrase Dei Gratia Rex or Dei Gratia Regina in some form, including abbreviations, until 1964. With the introduction of decimal coinage in 1966, the phrase was formally dropped.

=== Austria ===
Pre-1918 coins of the Austrian Empire that showed the bust of the emperor or empress included the initials D. G., for the Latin Dei Gratia.

=== Canada ===
Coins of the Canadian dollar struck during Queen Victoria's reign read Dei gratia Regina.

Canadian coins minted from 1902 until 1910 under King Edward VII read Dei gratia Rex Imperator or D:G Rex Imperator which is Latin for "by the grace of God, King Emperor". The Dei gratia portion was removed temporarily from Canadian coinage in 1911 and led to such a public uproar over the "godless" coins that it was returned to Canadian coinage in the subsequent year.

From 1911 to 1936, under George V, it read Dei gra:Rex et Ind:Imp which stands for Dei gratia Rex et Indiae Imperator which means "by the grace of God, King and Emperor of India".

From 1937 to 1947 under the reign of George VI, it was abbreviated D:G:Rex et Ind:Imp or Dei gra Rex et Ind:Imp. From 1948 to 1952, still under George VI, after the independence of India, they read Dei gratia Rex. From 1953 until 1964, under Queen Elizabeth II it read Dei gratia Regina and from 1965 onwards, it was abbreviated on all coins to D. G. Regina.

However, some commemorative coins issued under Elizabeth II do not include the phrase Dei gratia Regina or its abbreviated version. Canadian coins that do not have the phrase on its obverse include 1976 Montreal Olympics, 25¢ coins for the 2010 Vancouver Olympics, (but not the $1 coin issued for the same games), the 2001 10¢ coin commemorating volunteers, the 1982 $1 coin commemorating the patriation of the constitution, the 1984 Jacques Cartier commemorative dollar coin, the $2 coin issued in 2008 commemorating the 400th anniversary of Quebec City, and the 2012 $2 coin commemorating the War of 1812.

Gold, Silver, Platinum and Palladium Maple Leaf bullion coins also do not bear the monarch's style

In November 2023, with Royal Canadian Mint revealing the new coins bearing King Charles III's effigy, the phrase switched again to D. G. Rex.

Decimal coins of Newfoundland, New Brunswick and Nova Scotia issued before they joined Canada also include some variation of the phrase Dei gratia Regina or Dei gratia Rex.

=== Cyprus ===
Cyprus, while under British rule, included the phrase Dei Gratia Rex (or Regina) in some form on its coins until 1952. It was dropped after Queen Elizabeth II acceded to the throne in 1952, when the language of the legend was changed from Latin to English.

=== Hungary ===
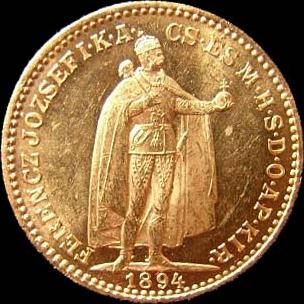
20 korona, 1894, obverse

As part of Austria-Hungary, Hungary minted its own version of coins after the Compromise of 1867 until the end of WWI. The obverse of some coins bore the phrase ISTEN KEGYELMÉBŐL but always in the abbreviated form I.K.

=== Jersey ===
The Bailiwick of Jersey included the phrase Dei Gratia Rex (or Regina) Fid. Def. in some form on its coins until 1952. It was dropped after Queen Elizabeth II acceded to the throne in 1952.

=== Spain ===
Many Spanish coins prior to 1937 included the Spanish phrase por la gracia de Dios. Those coins issued after 1937 under Franco that had his image included the phrase Caudillo de España por la G. de Dios. With the resumption of democracy under a constitutional monarchy after 1975 the phrase was dropped from Spanish coins.

=== Sweden ===
Some coins minted during the reign of Queen Christina of Sweden bear an inscription of CHRISTINA D.G.R.S. on the obverse, and at least one 17th-century Swedish silver medal depicts Karl XI, bearing the inscription CAROLVS XI DEI GRATIA SVEC GOTH VANDAL REX (Karl XI, with God's grace, King of the Svears, Goths and Vandals), the reverse depicting Ulrika Eleonora with the inscription VLRICA ELEONORA DEI GRATIA REGINA SVECIAE (Ulrika Eleonora, with God's grace, Queen of Sweden). Although some Swedish coins continue to bear the bust of the monarch, the phrase is no longer on the coins.

=== United Kingdom ===
United Kingdom coins have for some time included the phrase Dei Gratia Regina (or Rex/Reg Fid Def or some form of it). When Elizabeth II ascended to the throne, coins of the pound sterling initially had the phrase Dei Gratia Britanniarum Omnium Regina Fidei Defensatrix (by the Grace of God, of all the Britains Queen, Defender of the Faith), or some form abbreviated form of the phrase. Britanniarum Omnium was later dropped from the phrase in 1954, with no reference to any realm made on coins issued after that year.

Presently, most coins of the pound sterling have an abbreviated version of the phrase, Dei Gra Reg Fid Def, or Dei Gra Reg F. D, circumscribed on the obverse

== See also ==
- Style of the British sovereign
- Style of the Canadian sovereign
- Style of the Dutch sovereign
- Style of the French sovereign
- Style of the Portuguese sovereign
