= George Kruger Gray =

English artist and designer (1880–1943)

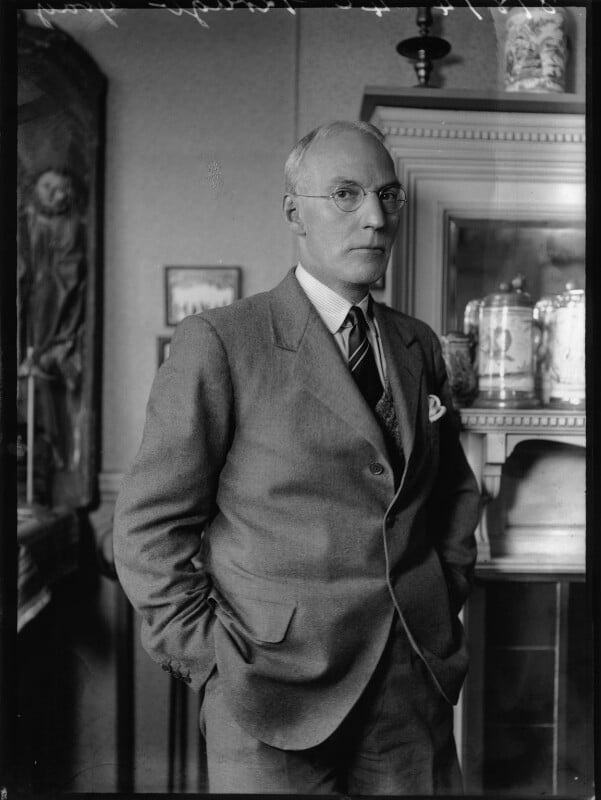
Gray in 1936

George Edward Kruger Gray (né Kruger) CBE (25 December 1880 – 2 May 1943) was an English artist, best remembered for his designs of coinage and stained glass windows.

== Personal life ==
Kruger was born in 1880 at 126 Kensington Park Road, London, the son of a Jersey merchant, and was christened George Edward Kruger in Kensington.

He attended Merchant Taylors' Boys' School, Crosby and in July 1893 was dramatically rescued from Crosby Beach by Eyton Owen, a schoolmaster of another school, during an incident in which his older brother and their friend, all day boys at Merchant Taylors', were drowned.

He received his tertiary education at the Bath School of Art (today Bath School of Art and Design a department of Bath Spa University). There he won a scholarship to the Royal College of Art in London, from which he graduated with a Diploma in Design in his birth name George Edward Kruger. From 1905 he exhibited water colours at the Royal Academy, specialising in landscapes, flower studies and portraits.

During the First World War, Kruger served with the Artists Rifles, and a camouflage unit of the Royal Engineers which specialised in hiding military items and making dummy objects to confuse enemy forces.

In 1918, following his marriage to (Frances) Audrey Gordon Gray, daughter of John Gray, he changed his name to George Kruger Gray. They had a son, Douglas, in October 1920.

After the war, he continued his career as an artist. In 1923, he exhibited his numismatic works at the Royal Academy of Arts, winning a considerable reputation in that area, and become a 'preferred contractor' for the Royal Mint, designing coins for Great Britain, as well as other parts of the Empire.

In 1938, he became a Commander of the Most Excellent Order of the British Empire (CBE).

Although best known for the design of numismatic items, he also designed and made stained glass windows for churches, universities and the like. As well, he illustrated books, and made posters and cartoons.

Kruger Gray died in Chichester, West Sussex, on 2 May 1943. He is buried in St Mary Churchyard, Fittleworth, Chichester.

== Coinage ==
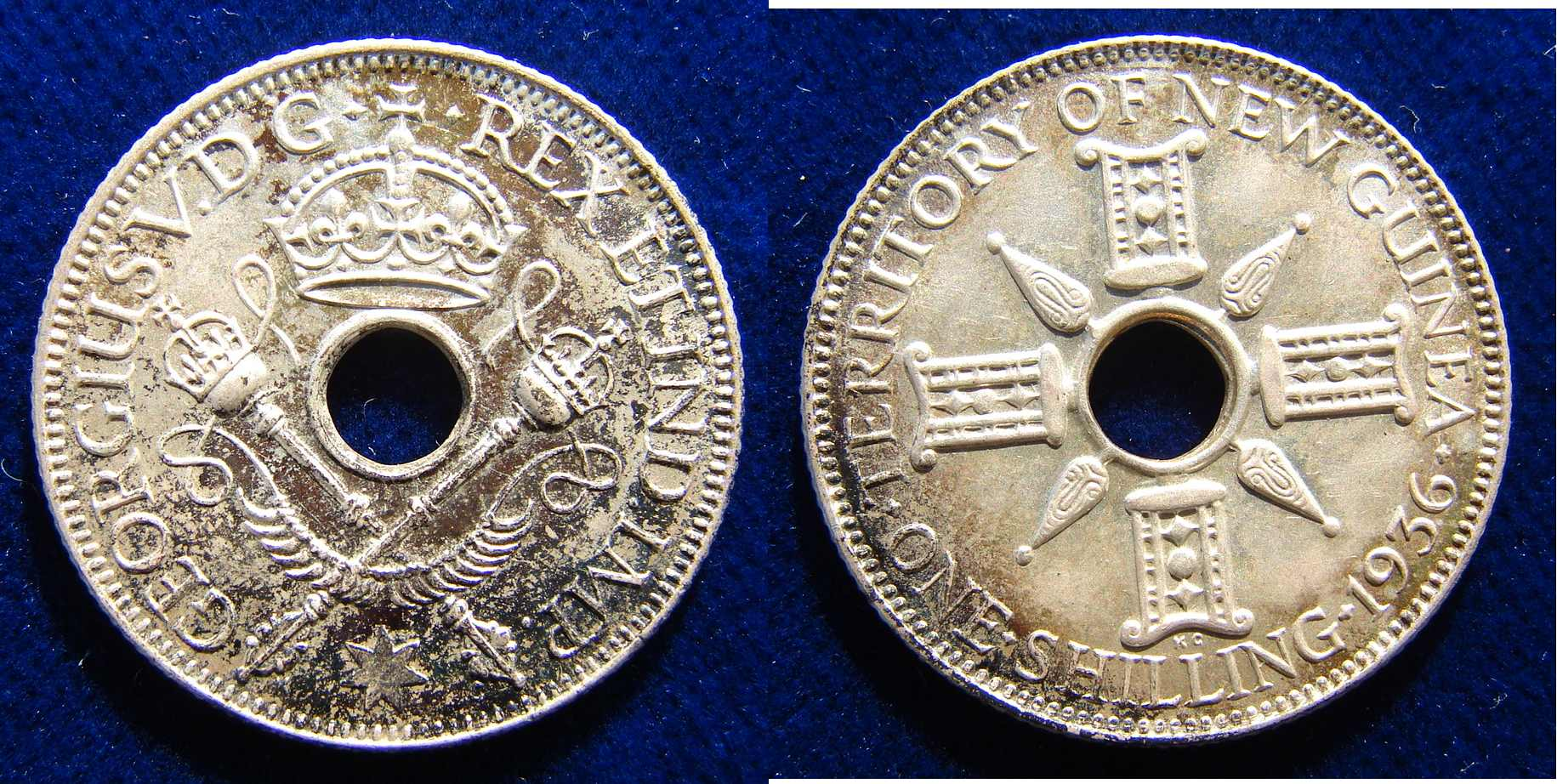
Australian New Guinea 1936 Silver Shilling by George Kruger Gray

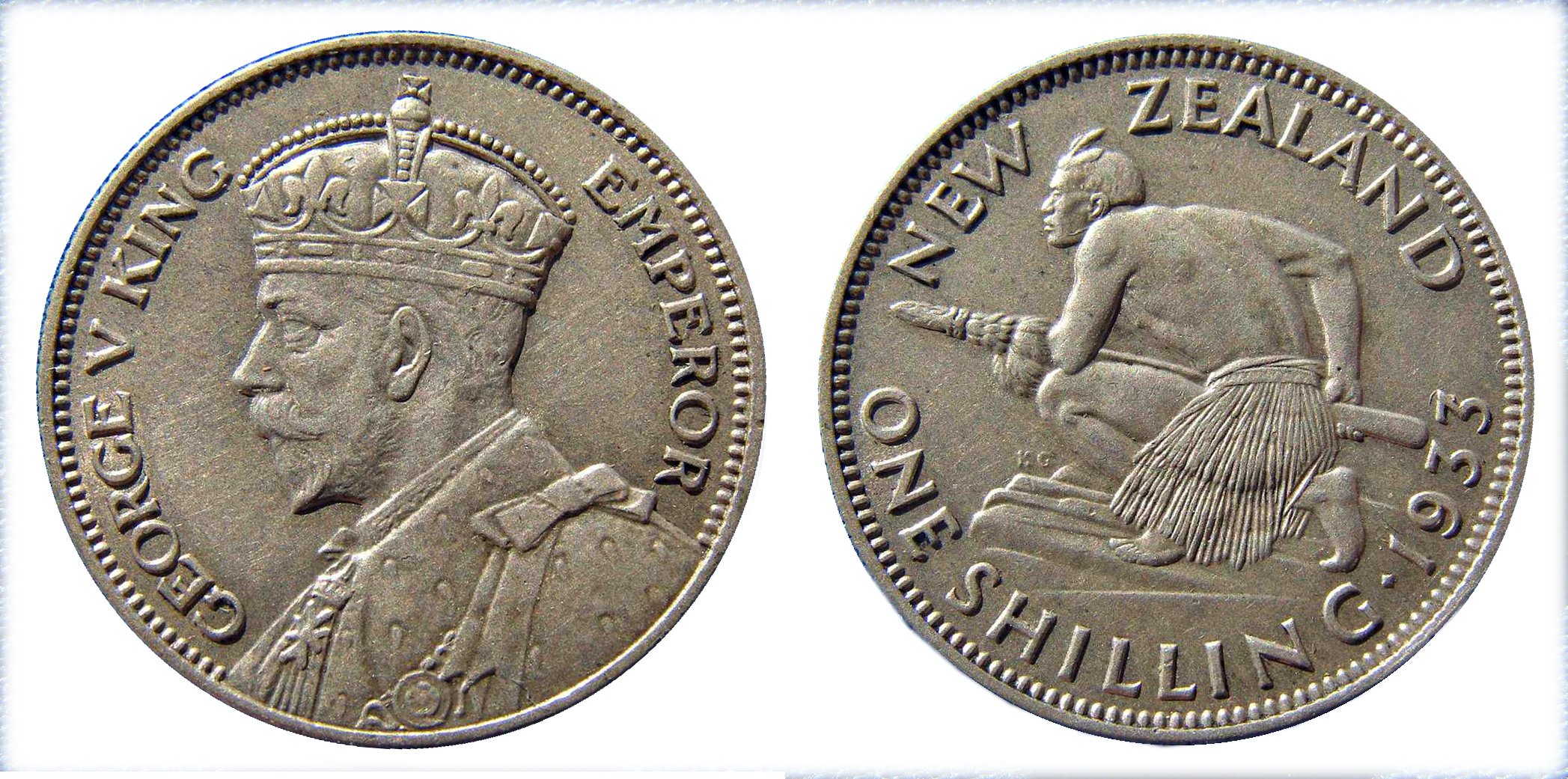
George Kruger Gray's design of the 1st New Zealand 1 Shilling Silver coin with a Māori warrior presenting his Taiaha l.

- Kruger Gray designed the Reverse ("Tails") of most of Australia's second set of currency, used from 1937 until the changeover to decimal currency in 1966. This included the halfpenny, penny, threepence, shilling, florin and crown. (The sixpence did not change design.) Additionally, he designed the reverses of the commemorative florins for 1927 and 1935.
- In Canada, he designed the reverse of the one cent (penny) in use from 1937-2012, five cents (nickel) in use from 1937 to the present day, and 50-cent coins in use from 1937 to 1958.
- For Cyprus, he designed the reverse of the 1938–1940 9 piastres and 18 piastres, 1928 45 and 4½ piastres, and 1947–1949 florin.
- For Great Britain he designed the reverse for the 1927–1945 silver threepence, 1927–1948 sixpence, 1927–1936 shilling, both the Scottish and English motifs for the 1937–1948 shilling, 1927–1948 florin, 1927–1948 half crown, 1927–1936 crown (except for the 1935 Jubilee crown), and 1937 crown. The 1927 date was issued only as proof specimens. His designs for the shilling (both designs), florin and half crown were continued from 1949-1952, though do not bear his initials 'KG' because the inscription had been modified by the omission of 'IND:IMP' and the layout was therefore modified by another hand.
- For Jersey, he designed the reverse for the 1927–1952 1/12th shilling (the penny) and the 1/24th shilling (the halfpenny).
- For Mauritius, he designed the reverse for the 1 cent, 2 cents, 5 cents and 10 cents for 1937 to 1978, and the 1/4, 1/2 and 1 rupee of 1934–1978, though some of his designs are still being used in the 21st century.
- For New Guinea, he designed the reverse for the 1936–1944 penny, threepence, sixpence and shilling.
- For New Zealand, he designed the reverse for the threepence (depicting crossed patu), the sixpence (depicting a huia bird), the shilling (depicting a Maori warrior holding a Taiaha), the florin (depicting a kiwi), and the half crown reverse 1933–1965.
- For South Africa, he designed the reverse for the ¼d (farthing), ½d (halfpenny), 1d (penny), threepence, sixpence, shilling, florin, and half crown 1923–1960. Reverse 1961–1964 half, two and half, five, ten and twenty cents.
- For Southern Rhodesia, he designed the reverse side of the 1932–1952 threepence, the 1932–1952 sixpence, the 1932–1952 shilling, the 1932–1954 two shillings, and the 1932–1952 half crown.

== Other works ==
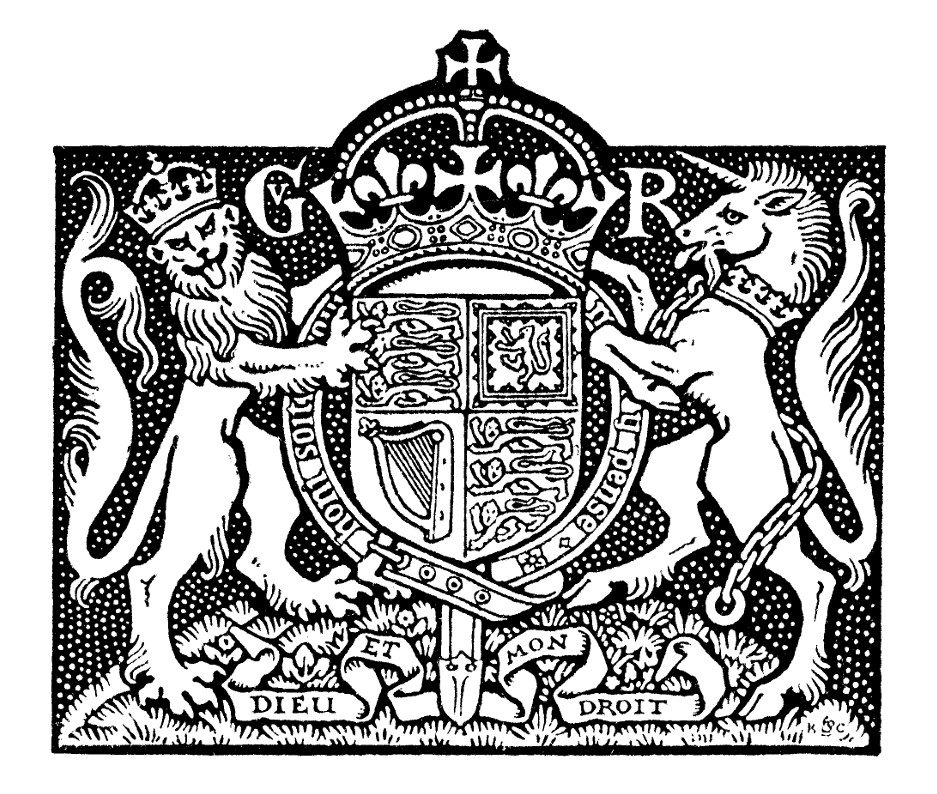
Lesser Royal Arms designed by Kruger Gray in 1924 for use by HM Government during the reign of George V

Kruger Gray was a well known artisan of his time, and produced a number of coats of arms, including the version used by the University of Western Australia from 1929 to 1963. He also designed the Flag of the Colony of Aden.

He was involved in designing the new Badge for Baronets authorised by Royal Warrant of 10 May 1929.

He designed what became an important distinction given to the Royal Naval Patrol Service in the form of an exclusive silver badge. Officers and men of the Patrol Service were awarded this badge after a total of six months service at sea. It could also be awarded beforehand to those showing worthy conduct while engaged in action. Winston Churchill, First Lord of the Admiralty, 1939 wrote in the following minute:

FIRST LORD to FORTH SEA LORD
I am told that the Minesweepers men have no badge. If this is so it must be remedied at once. I am asking Mr. Bracken to call for designs from Sir Kenneth Clark within one week, after which production must begin with the greatest speed, and distribution as the deliveries come to hand.

The design of the badge measured roughly the size of an old shilling. The design had to symbolise the work of both the minesweeping and the anti-submarine personnel. The finished design took the form of a shield upon which a sinking shark, speared by a marlin spike, was set against a background made up of a fishing net with two trapped enemy mines. This was flanked by two examples of the nautical knot and at the top the naval crown. Beneath the badge was a scroll bearing the letters M/S-A/S (Minesweeping Anti-Submarine). A larger version (about 12" high and 7" wide) was also produced, as a painted cast-iron plaque with three screwholes to mount it at an appropriate location on a qualifying vessel.

The shark symbolised a U-boat and the marlin spike, the tool of the Merchant navy. The net and the mines were both symbols of the fishermen who now found themselves at war seeking a new deadly catch. Never before had one section of the Royal Navy been similarly honoured.

His design for an insignia to denote the award of a "King's Commendation for Brave Conduct" was accepted and used for a period from 1943.

In 1940 Gray designed the new George Medal for gallantry based on a bookplate for the Royal Library at Windsor Castle by Stephen Gooden.

One of his final works was a very personal piece. His brother Kenneth, a civilian, had died in unknown circumstances in Yokohama, Japan, in 1942, probably during internment. Gray painted a memorial to him in the format of a stained glass window. If there was a hope to recreate the design in glass, it apparently never happened.
