= Sixpence (Australian coin) =

Australian coin

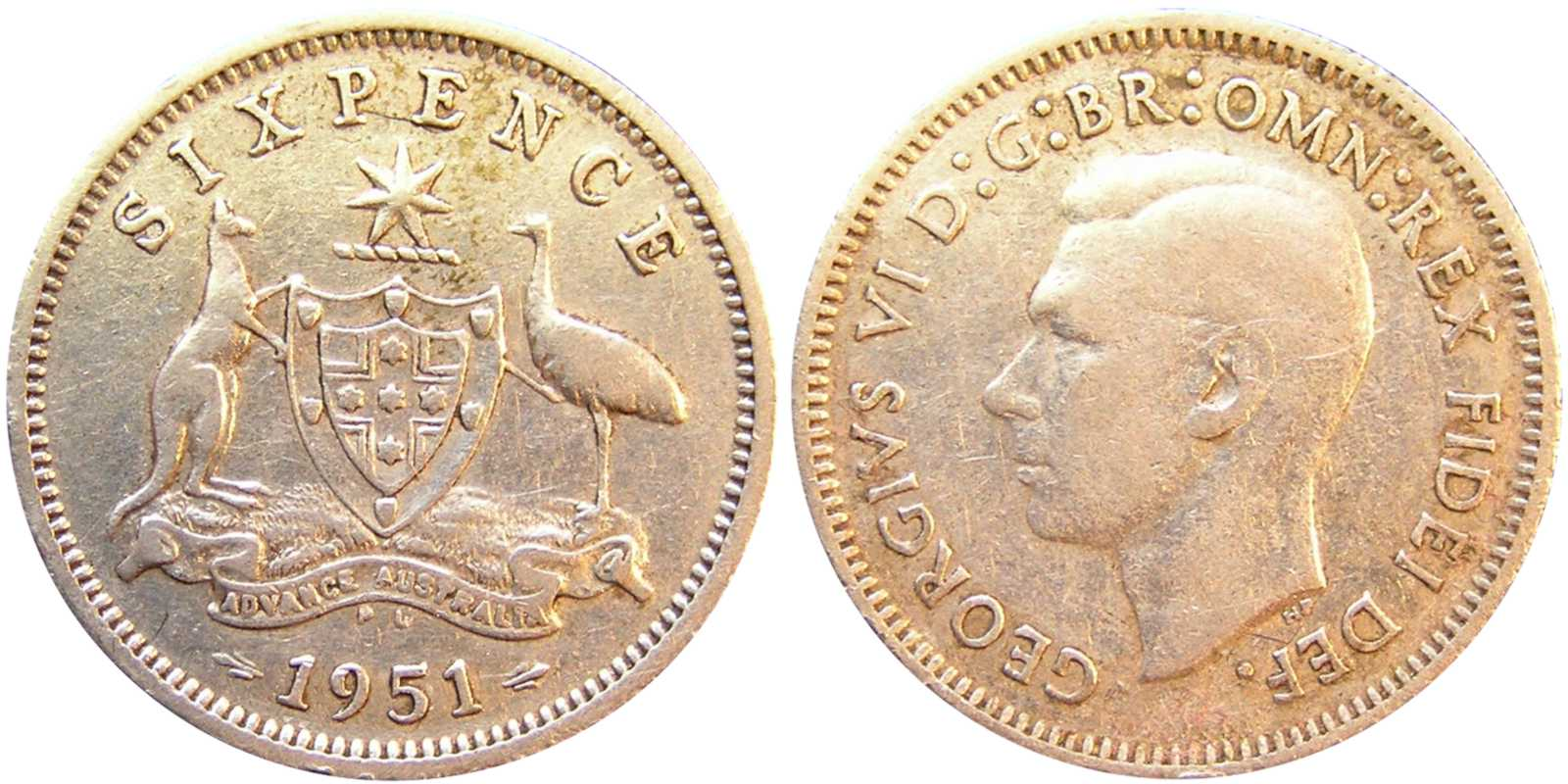
A sixpence of 1951, with the reverse side on the left

The Australian sixpence circulated from 1910 up until the decimalisation of Australian Currency in 1966. The coins were initially minted in England; however, Australia began to mint their own from the year of 1916 at branches of the Royal Mint in Sydney and Melbourne. The coins which made up Australia's pre-decimal currency were identical to British currency in the characteristics of weight and size. The Coinage Act 1909, authorised the issue of Australian coins in the select denominations, including the sixpence. By 1916 all silver denominations, including the sixpence, could be minted at the Royal Mint branch in Melbourne. Unique Australian currency was created with decimalisation in 1966.

At the time of the sixpence, Australian lives were "very English":

The money ran through nursery rhymes up to Shakespeare; on the land, 'a pound for a pound' meant good news for wool growers; two-up schools needed pennies to play; and slang words for the money, zac, traybob, deena, and quid, littered the language [...].

== Origin ==
The Commonwealth of Australia was formed in 1901, with the six self-governing colonies joining together.

With the establishment of the Commonwealth in 1901, the Australian currency consisted of gold, silver and bronze coins from the United Kingdom. Initially the sixpence was identical to that of the British in "weight and fineness". The Coinage Act 1909 made Australian sixpence, florin, shilling, threepence, penny and half-penny coins legal tender.

The Coinage Act 1909 required that batches of silver coins should be 925 fine, also known as 'sterling silver', meaning they were made of an alloy composed of 92.5% pure silver and 7.5% copper.

On 1 March 1910 RMS Otranto arrived in Sydney carrying the initial shipment of Australian Commonwealth silver shillings from the Royal Mint, London. Other coins, including sixpence, arrived later in the year, completing the set of new Australian silver currency. The first Australian coins that were shipped bore the bust of Edward VII, who had died before the coins reached Australia.

The origin of the word sixpence is derived from saxpence. Another term for the sixpence is zac, which was first recorded in Australian English in the 1890s. It was also used to mean "a trifling sum of money". Although the sixpence is no longer in use within Australia, the word zac is still used within Australia with fond memories.

== Designs ==
It is a tradition that the direction in which the British monarchs face on coins changes with each reign. This is believed to have begun with Charles II, who refused to have his portrait painted the same way as Oliver Cromwell, his way to turn his back towards the man who beheaded his father.

The design of the Australian sixpence was not changed for 50 years, bearing a record as the coin which was least changed. The final sixpence minted in 1963 in Melbourne had the same reverse as the first ever coin struck in 1910 in London.

1910: The obverse of the sixpence in circulation during 1910 had Edward VII crowned and robed facing the right, and the arms of the Commonwealth of Australia on the reverse, as authorised by royal warrant. William DeSaulles, the Chief Engraver at the Royal mint, designed the obverse of the Edward VII sixpence. DeSaulles initials DES appear at the base of the 1910 sixpence.

1911–1936: The coins arrived in Australia after King Edward VII died. When the King died in 1910, George V ascended the throne. The coins minted after 1911, had George V crowned and facing left on the obverse.

1938–1952: King George VI came to the throne on 10 December 1936, after Edward VIII's abdication. The Royal Mints impressed nature associated with Coin designer, Thomas High Paget's job on the 1935 Prince of Wales commemorative medal, led Paget to be asked to join the competition for the new coins for Edward VIII's ascension to the throne. Paget's design was successful in being picked, however was never used or issued after Edward VIII's abdication. Paget created a new designed with was used for the commemoration of George VI's coronation. The coin pictured him looking to the left with no crown. The only thing that changed with the George VI coin was the writing on the obverse. Between 1938-1948 and 1950–1952, different words are depicted on the coins, this can be seen in more detail below.

1953: Queen Elizabeth II ascended the throne on the death of her father, George VI, in February 1952. The Australian commonwealth coinage designs changed to picture a portrait of the Queen on the obverse. The reverse remained the same. Similarly to George VI coin, the writing depicted on the coin for Queen Elizabeth II changed between 1953–1954 and 1955–1963. More detail can be seen below.

Ultimately, out of all pre-decimal coinage, the sixpence is the only coin whose reverse was not altered. The reverse consisted of a coat of arms approved by Edward VII in the year 1908. The main feature of the arms was a shield derived from the Australian coat of arms, which was supported by a kangaroo and an emu and a seven-pointed star as the crest, as well as the words Advance Australia on the scroll underneath. This is considered surprising as the 1908 coat of arms symbol was changed in 1912 within Australia, and as such was obsolete for most of the pre-decimal currency period. The new version of the coat of arms did not appear in the correct form until the 1966 50 cent piece.

The Commonwealth Treasury mintage figures show that 13,760,000 sixpences were issued in 1951. These coins were produced at the Melbourne Mint; however examination with a magnifying glass shows that there is an engraving of the letters PL, which is a mintmark demonstrating that the coin was struck at the Royal Mint in London.

== Value ==
The 1918 sixpence is the rarest and most valuable, which is considered to be worth A$40 in E F (extremely fine) condition and A$200 in an uncirculated condition.

The 1916, 1917, 1912, 1920, 1914 and 1911 sixpences are also rare, and 1935 and 1924 coins are scarce.

Uncirculated: Refers to an uncirculated coin as one that has a mint-fresh lustre with a clear detail of the heads of the emu and kangaroo. Magnification should also show no blemishes, and the feathers of the emu should show no trace of wear.

Extremely fine: In terms of an extremely fine coin, these are ones which show superficial scratches, of the chutes and conveyors of the machines, as well as having a large deal of their mint lustre remaining.

The sixpence was the most favoured medium of exchange, so that a collector would struggle to obtain all the varieties in good quality, as most were well-used and worn.

== Specifications ==
Image	Monarch	Years	Composition	Designers
	King Edward VII	1910	92.5% silver, 7.5% copper	Obverse: George W. De Saulles Reverse: W.H.J. Blakemore |
	King George V	1911-36	92.5% silver, 7.5% copper	Obverse: Thomas H. Paget Reverse: W.H.J. Blakemore
	King George VI	1938-45	92.5% silver, 7.5% copper	Obverse: Thomas H. Paget Reverse: W.H.J. Blakemore
	King George VI	1946 - 52	50% silver, 40% copper, 5% zinc, 5% nickel	Obverse: Thomas H. Paget Reverse: W.H.J. Blakemore
	Queen Elizabeth II	1953 - 63	50% silver, 40% copper, 5% zinc, 5% nickel	Obverse: Mary Gillick Reverse: W.H.J. Blakemore
These images are to scale at 2.5 pixels per millimetre. For table standards, see the coin specification table.

== The decimalisation of Australian currency ==
In the late 1950s the Decimal Currency committee guided that the Australian government begin to consider to replacement of imperial systems with decimal currency. The introduction of a decimal currency would simplify calculations, and increase financial efficiency, eventuating in a positive economic outcome for Australia.

Gerard McManus stated in Management Today, February 2014,

After almost 50 years, in terms of implementation of a government programme, decimalisation remains arguably one of the most seamless and best executed reforms in Australia's history [...].

The decimalisation of Australia's currency advanced Australia's economic independence and promoted Australian symbols.

Upon decimalisation, the sixpence was worth five cents.

As such, the new five cent coin had exactly the same size and value of the old six pence.

As of 2021 the five cent coin retains the same size and value of the old six pence. As such, the old sixpence coins have never been demonetised in Australia and can still be found in change occasionally.

The same applies to the shilling, which became ten cents, and the florin, which became twenty cents.

Unlike the United Kingdom, where the shilling and florin sized coins were withdrawn in the 1990s in favour of smaller decimal coins, Australian 10c and 20c coins have never been reduced in size, meaning shillings and florins are also found occasionally in change.

== Mintmarks ==
- D : Denver
- M : Melbourne
- PL : London
- S : San Francisco

Preceded by Sixpence (British)	Sixpence; 1910–1966	Succeeded by Five cent coin (Australian)
