= William Henry James Blakemore =

British medallist (1871–1945)

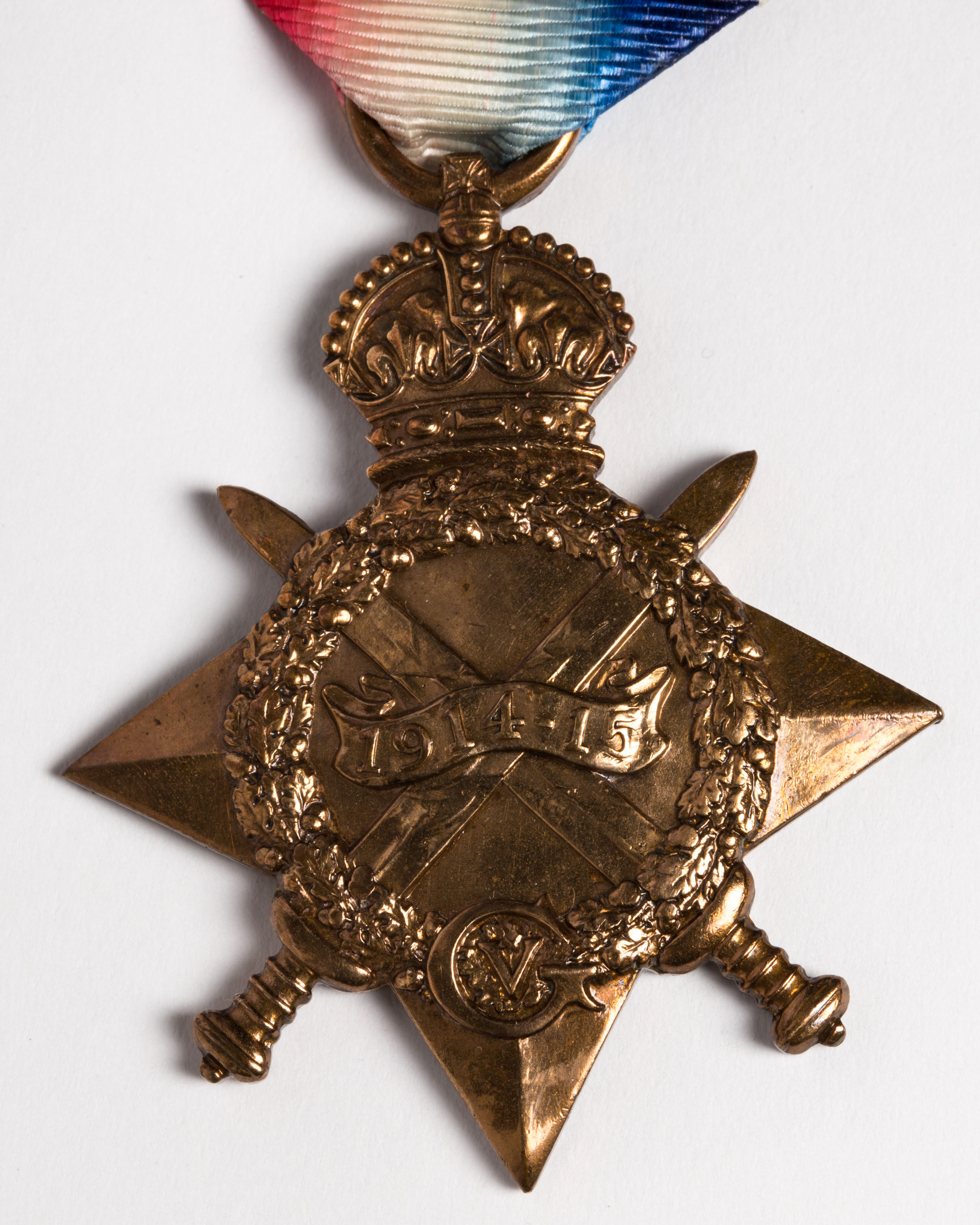
1914–15 Star medal designed by Blakemore

William Henry James Blakemore (1871, in West Midlands Birmingham, England – 1945) was an English engraver, and medallist at the Royal Mint London. Signature: WHJB

== Life ==
William Blakemore was born in Warwickshire West Midlands Birmingham, England in June 1871. Ten years later he lived with his parents James Blakemore and Mary Ann in Buckingham near London. On 1 August 1900 William Blakemore married in Birmingham Beatrice Blanche Packer. In September 1901 their only child L.W. Blakemore was born in London-Lewisham. William Blakemore died on 29 January 1945 at his home in South Croydon Surrey.

== Work ==
- 1900: William Blakemore starts an engraver position at the Royal Mint London. This turned out to become his lifelong employment.
- 1924: Promotion to Special Craftsman at the Royal Mint
- 1931: Retirement during the depression. After his retirement Blakemore continued providing specialised medallist services to the Royal Mint London on a part-time basis.

During his long career with the Royal Mint William Blakemore was the craftsman for the engraving of master dies for the Royal Mint London, and other Royal Mint branches, like the Royal Canadian Mint. He also engraved the designs for the first Australian coins of 1910.
