= Mary Gillick =

British sculptor (1881–1965)

Mary Gillick OBE
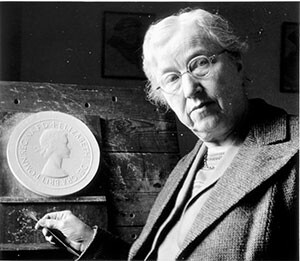
- Born: 4 April 1881; Nottingham, England
- Died: 27 January 1965 (aged 83); London, England
- Education: Nottingham School of Art, Royal College of Art

Mary Gaskell Gillick (née Tutin; 1881 – 27 January 1965) was a sculptor and medallist, best known for her effigy of Elizabeth II used on coinage in the United Kingdom and elsewhere from 1953 to 1970.

Effigy of Elizabeth II by Mary Gillick

== Personal life ==
Born Mary Gaskell Tutin in Nottingham, she was the eldest of three children born to Thomas Tutin and Elizabeth Gaskell (née Ardern), who wed on 25 March 1880 in Knutsford, Cheshire.

She was educated at the Nottingham School of Art (1898–1902) and at the Royal College of Art (1902–1904), where she studied under the sculptor Édouard Lantéri.

After making her first exhibition at the Royal Academy in 1911, she designed several medals to be used as awards, and several other, larger relief sculptures in stone and bronze including the stone commemorative sculpture, Crosby Hall, Chelsea 1926

In 1905, she married sculptor Ernest Gillick.

== Honours ==
She was appointed OBE in the 1953 Coronation Honours.

== Effigy of Elizabeth II ==
In 1952, Gillick's effigy design was selected from a field of seventeen to be used on general-circulation coinage for the new Queen Elizabeth, first issued in 1953. Gillick worked on the portrait between March and October 1952, with one sitting and close supervision by the Duke of Edinburgh. Gillick's design was notable for portraying the Queen uncrowned, and was the last to be used on the pre-decimal coinage.

Gillick's die master had insufficient relief, and the striking was too weak. Facial features and the dress folds in the shoulder disappeared. The problem was solved by re-cutting the dies. This remastering was performed by Cecil Thomas, an experienced medallist who had already crafted overseas currencies featuring Elizabeth II, but who had initially been turned down for the British coinage in preference to Gillick.

A cameo of Gillick's effigy of the Queen has been used on British commemorative stamps from 1966 to 9 March 2023; the original effigy was also used for Maundy money until the Queen's death in 2022.

Preceded by Thomas Humphrey Paget	Coins of the pound sterling Obverse sculptor 1952	Succeeded by Arnold Machin
