= Centennial half-crown =

Commemorative coin of New Zealand

Half-crown
- New Zealand
- Value: 2 1/2s (£NZ)
- Mass: 14.14 g
- Diameter: 32 mm
- Edge: Milled
- Composition: 50% silver, 50% quaternary alloy
- Years of minting: 1940

Obverse
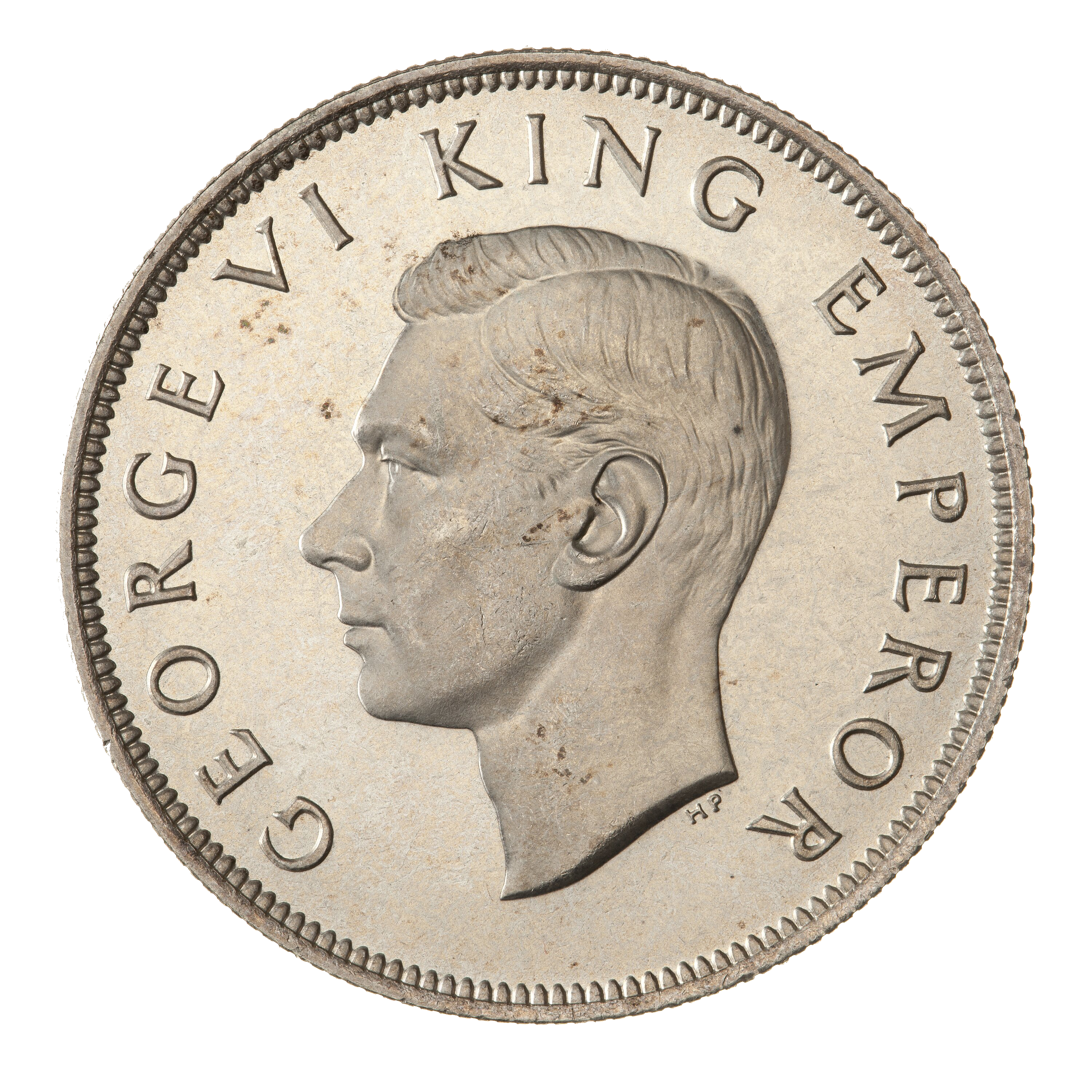
- Design: Bust of George VI
- Designer: Humphrey Paget

Reverse
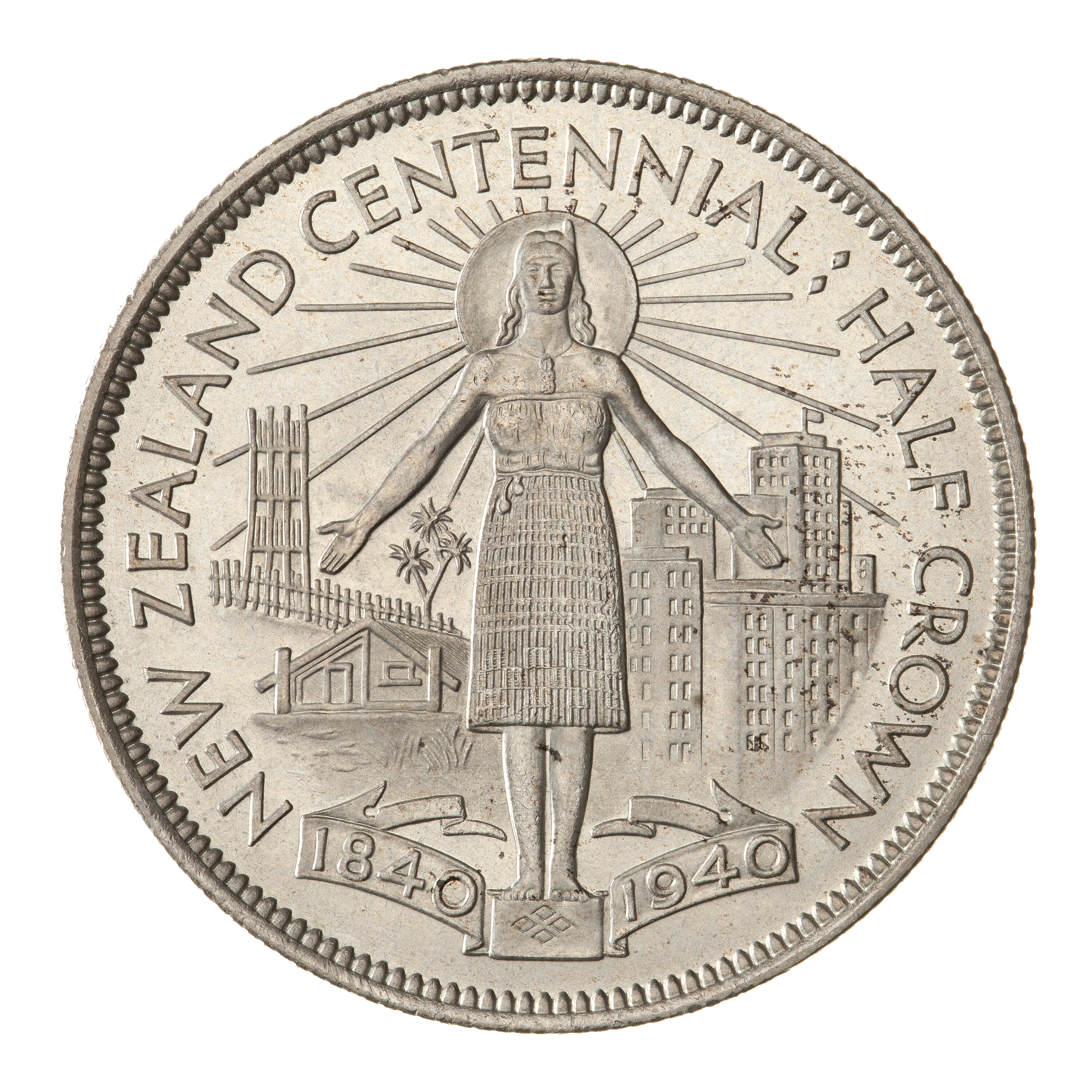
- Design: A Māori woman standing with her arms outstretched, surrounded by traditional Māori architecture on one side and tall modern buildings behind.
- Designer: Leonard Cornwall Mitchell

The Centennial half-crown is a commemorative coin of the New Zealand half-crown released in 1940 to coincide with the hundredth anniversary of the Treaty of Waitangi. A 1938 government-sponsored design competition for the commemorative half-crown, alongside the concurrently released penny and halfpenny, was won by New Zealand artist Leonard Cornwall Mitchell. The coin features a Māori woman surrounded by traditional Māori architecture on her right, a modern cityscape on her left, and a rising sun behind her head. The coin, like other contemporary New Zealand half-crowns, had a diameter of 32 mm and a weight of 14.14 grams (half an ounce), and was struck by the Royal Mint in .500 fineness silver. Unlike the Waitangi crown, the first New Zealand commemorative issue, a large mintage of 100,800 coins was produced and released directly into circulation at face value. However, the popularity of the coin led to it rapidly exiting circulation into private collections.

== Background ==
New Zealand adopted domestic coinage in 1933, including the half-crown as its largest circulating denomination. All coinage featured the reigning monarch on the obverse and a unique design incorporating local iconography on the reverse; the standard half-crown's reverse features the coat of arms of New Zealand surrounded by Māori carvings.

The nation's first commemorative coin, the Waitangi crown, was originally intended to be dated 1933, released alongside the initial set of denominations. Delays and revisions in design pushed this to a 1935 release in extremely limited numbers, with only 1,128 coins produced. Sold at significantly higher than face value during the waning years of the Great Depression, it was ultimately unpopular with collectors.

It was unclear whether the Waitangi crown was primarily meant to commemorate the 1840 Treaty of Waitangi, or simply intended to cap-off a corresponding set of proof coins released. The treaty, signed in 1840 between various Māori chiefs and British representative William Hobson, asserted the sovereignty of the Crown over New Zealand, which had previously held unclear political control over the islands following the earlier Declaration of Independence. The treaty would become a constitutional document for New Zealand and the relationship between Māori and Pākehā, although mired in controversy due to a lack of enforceability and differences between English and Māori copies of the document. Commemoration of the treaty increased following the first Waitangi Day in 1934, marked by the donation and dedication of the Treaty House by Lord Bledisloe.

== History ==
The Waitangi Crown's delays and difficulties encouraged the longer-term planning of future commemorative coins. By August 1936, the New Zealand Numismatic Society began pursuing the creation of commemorative coinage to be issued for the centenary of the Treaty of Waitangi, which had increasingly been seen as a centennial for the country itself. Allan Sutherland proposed the creation of a commemorative half-crown to be released into circulation at face value. The government-appointed National Historical Committee was receptive to the Society's proposal, and cooperated with it to design the commemorative issue. Commemorative issues for other denominations such as the florin were rejected in favor of the larger half-crown, while another crown issue was deemed inadvisable in the aftermath of the unsuccessful Waitangi commemorative.

=== Design competition ===
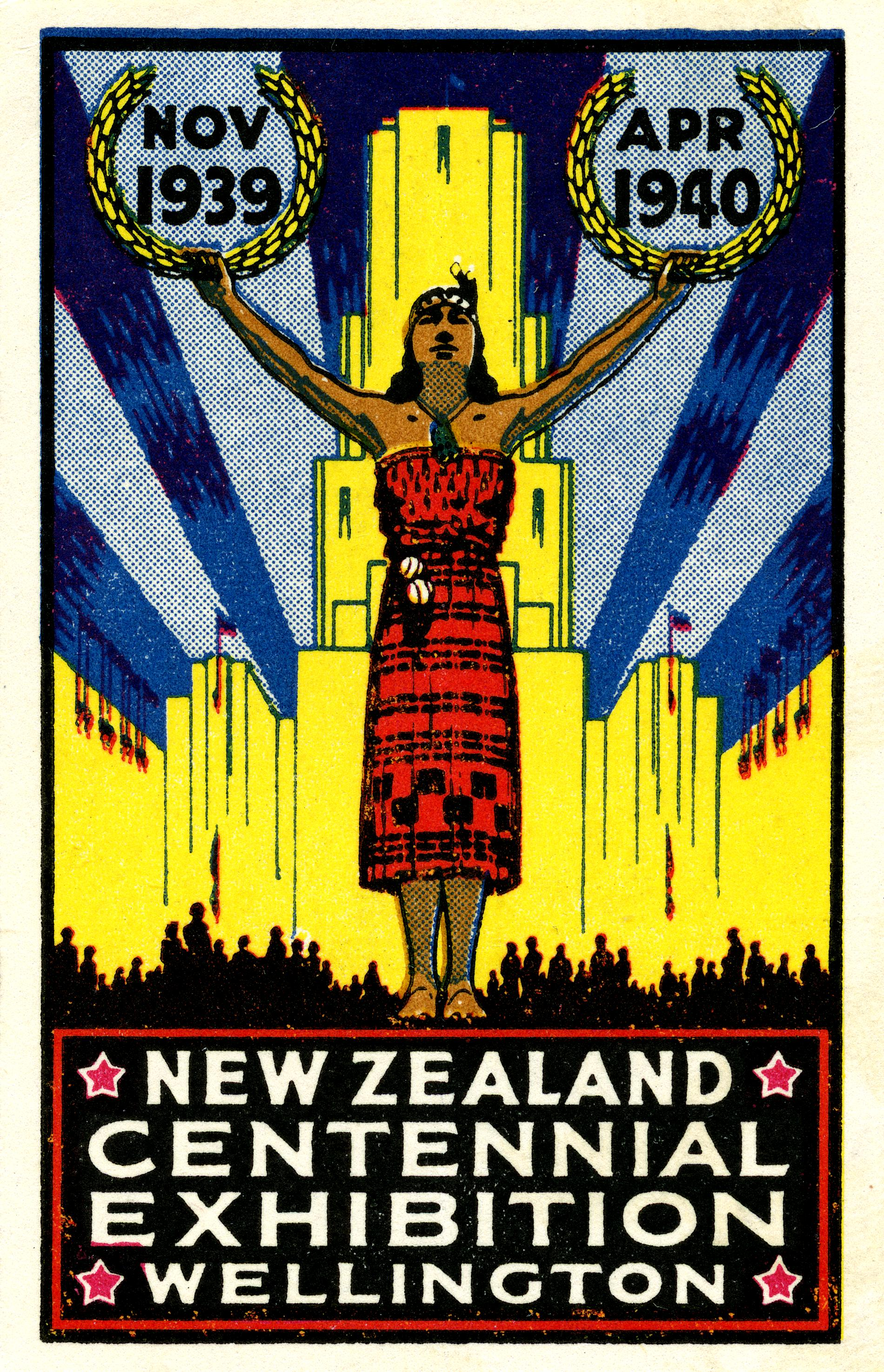
Poster for the New Zealand Centennial Exhibition

Beginning in late August 1938, a competition was held for the design of the commemorative half-crown's reverse, alongside the proposed penny and halfpenny denominations. A nominal prize of £30 was to be granted for the winning half-crown design, with the only design stipulations in the form of a general centennial theming and the text "New Zealand Centennial: 1840–1940 Half-Crown". Like contemporary New Zealand coinage, it would feature an obverse bearing a bust of George VI designed by Humphrey Paget. Prospective artists had until the end of September to submit designs via to-scale sketches. Minister of Finance Walter Nash appointed a selection committee to review submissions, composed of various financial ministers and members of the Numismatic Society. About twenty New Zealand artists were invited to participate (with at least five of them known to have submitted designs), alongside British Royal Mint designers Percy Metcalfe and George Kruger Gray, who were both granted permission to participate due to their work on the prior New Zealand coinage.

Art instructor and stamp designer Harry Linley Richardson submitted a design featuring a "virile youth" facing up, climbing a hill beneath a shining sun, while carrying a banner emblazoned with "New Zealand Centennial". Sculptor Francis Shurrock's submission shows an early 19th century colonist, wearing a top hat, shaking hands with a contemporary aviator. James Berry's combined the Treaty House with the Cook Landing Site obelisk. Metcalfe and Kruger Gray both submitted full suites of coinage designs to the competition. While greatly differing in the other denominations, their half-crown proposals were very similar; both featured a map of New Zealand, although Metcalfe additionally incorporated the stars of the Southern Cross.

=== Mitchell's half-crown ===
The New Zealander Leonard Cornwall Mitchell's designs were selected for all three denominations. His half-crown design featured a Māori woman in piupiu standing with her arms outstretched, flanked by traditional Māori architecture on her right, including a wharepuni (meeting house) and puhara (lookout post), alongside a cabbage tree. A modern cityscape is on her left, with a rising sun behind her head. The Royal Mint's task of transferring Mitchell's sketch to coinage proved troublesome. Minor changes to the design to accommodate transfer were approved by the High Commissioner in August 1939, and the coin entered production. The coin was relatively popular with the public, and had almost entirely disappeared from circulation by 1941.

== Mintage and production ==
The Centennial commemorative had the same dimensions as other New Zealand half-crowns, at 32 mm (1.3 in) in diameter and with a weight of 14.14 g (0.5 oz). It was struck in .500 fineness silver, with a milled edge. 100,800 were minted, including an unclear number of proof pieces. Three prototype examples are known of a proposed box set of the 1940 coinage, featuring the half-crown. The government declined a production order of the boxed coin set.
