= Coins of the New Zealand pound =

Former New Zealand coinage

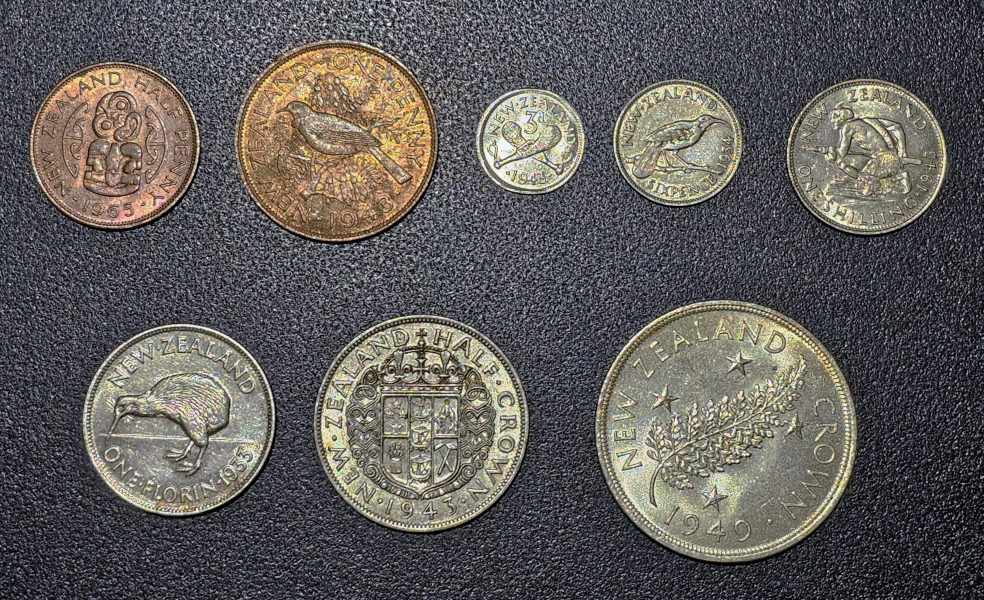
Denominations of the New Zealand pound

The first coinage of the New Zealand pound was introduced in 1933 in response to large-scale smuggling of prior British imperial coinage after devaluation of New Zealand exchange rates relative to the pound sterling and large influxes of other foreign coinage into circulation. The Coinage Act 1933 outlined the weights and compositions of various denominations, out of which five silver issues entered circulation over the following year, after lengthy disagreement between rival coinage design committees. The copper penny and halfpenny entered circulation in 1940, corresponding to anniversary of the New Zealand centennial. An eighth denomination of coin, the five-shilling piece or crown, was produced solely through three commemorative issues. The first issue, the Waitangi crown, was produced in extremely limited quantities and sold to collectors. Later commemorative crown issues in 1949 and 1953 were produced for circulation.

Silver coinage was abandoned in favour of cupronickel in 1947, except for the 1949 commemorative crown. With a decimal coinage system proposed since before its first introduction, New Zealand decimalised the national currency in 1967, introducing the New Zealand dollar.

== Background ==
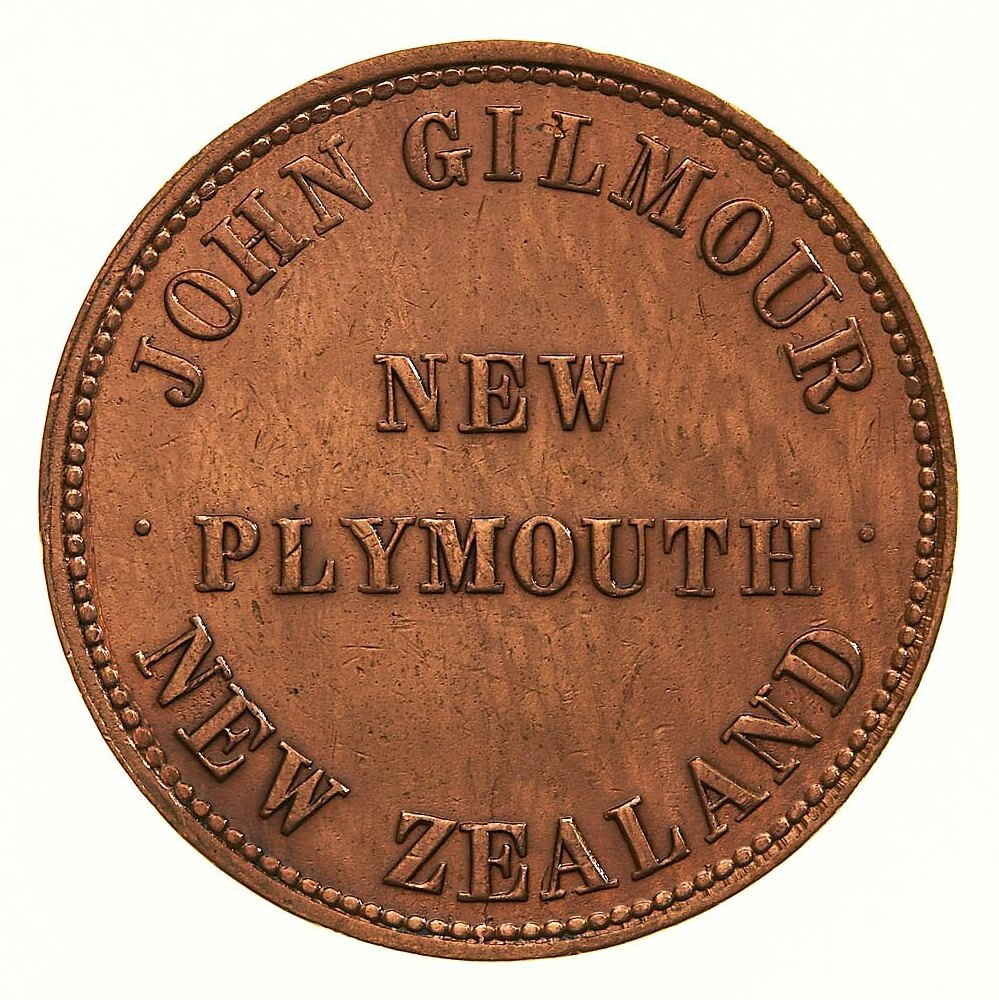
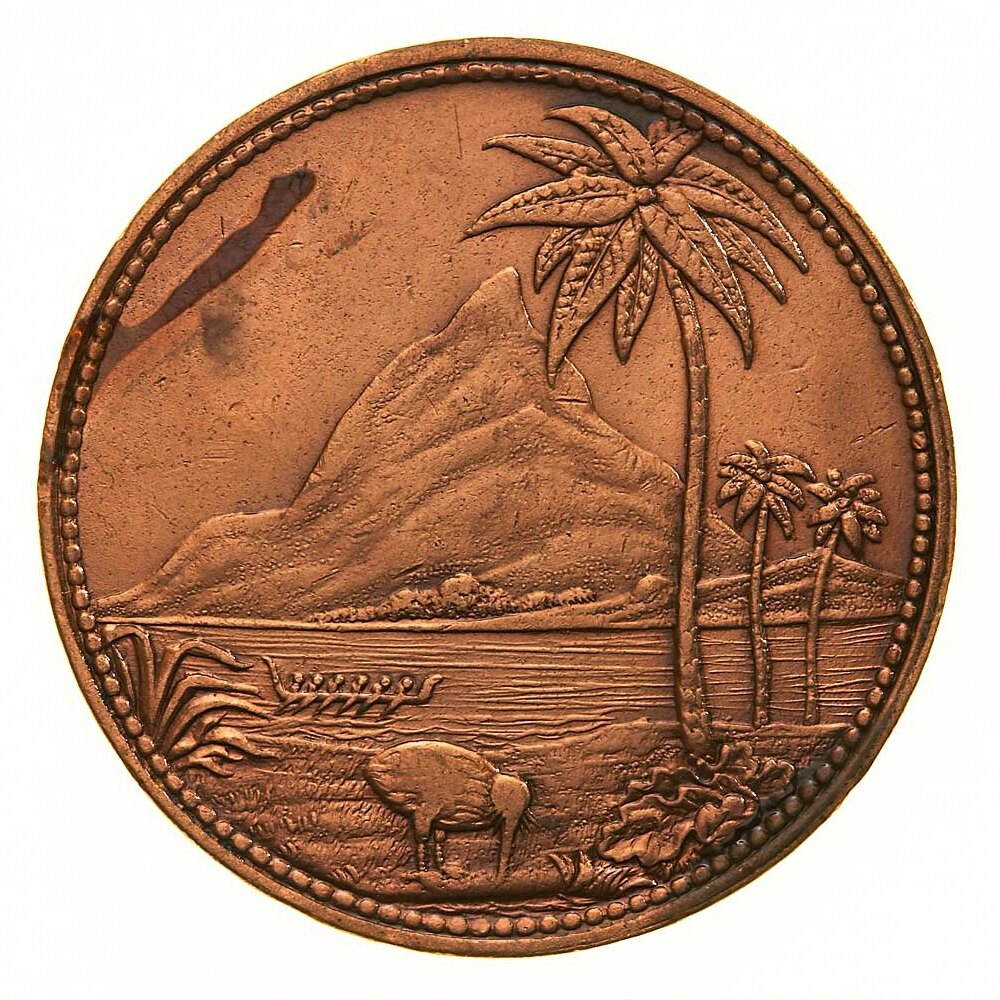
1866 copper one penny token issued by John Gilmour in New Plymouth, featuring a kiwi and Mount Taranaki.

Coinage was first brought to New Zealand by whalers and traders in the early 19th century. Following the establishment of the Colony of New Zealand in the 1840s, Spanish silver coins formed the bulk of currency in circulation, but silver and gold coinage from the United States, Portugal, France, and the Netherlands also circulated. The legal tender was assumed to be the British pound, but no legislation confirming this existed until the English Laws Act 1858. Due to a shortage of small coins, various privately issued bronze and copper tokens of penny and halfpenny denominations were issued beginning in 1857, forming about half of copper coinage in local circulation. Minting of the tokens ceased in 1881, and they were officially demonetised in 1897.

Various privately issued banknotes, redeemable in the New Zealand pound, circulated in the colony over the rest of the 19th century after the failure of the Colonial Bank of Issue. An 1890s banking crisis led to the Bank Note Issue Act 1893 required private banknotes to be backed by gold coinage. The Coinage Act 1870, introduced to New Zealand in 1898, formalised the Crown's sole monopoly over coinage. By the turn of the century enough British coinage had entered circulation to meet New Zealand's demand. While still tied to the pound sterling, the New Zealand pound began to diverge following the British readoption of the gold standard after World War I; unlike in the United Kingdom, the standard was not reinstated in New Zealand during the postwar period.

Early proposals of an independent New Zealand coinage include a 1910 statement to Parliament by Minister of Finance Joseph Ward, stating that the ministry was considering minting New Zealand silver coinage in London. The presence of large amounts of Imperial coins and domestic banknotes led to a lack of public interest in proposals for domestic coinage prior to the 1930s.

The 1910 introduction of the Australian pound caused a limited amount of Australian coinage to circulate in New Zealand, although this was never recognised as legal tender. In an attempt to stabilise the economic position during the Great Depression, Australia demonetised the pound by ten per cent in 1930, leading to an extremely large influx of Australian coins into the country. By October 1931, thirty to forty per cent of all coinage in circulation in New Zealand was Australian. In response to this large amounts of unrecognised coinage, Charles Wilkinson proposed the creation of an independent New Zealand coinage, raising the possibility of local mintage in Wellington. High Commissioner Thomas Wilford approached the Royal Mint about the possibility. Deputy Master of the Royal Mint Robert Johnson discouraged the proposal, stating that neither Australia nor the United Kingdom would be able to repatriate large quantities of currency.

== Introduction of national coinage ==
=== Legislation ===
In January 1933, Minister of Finance and former Prime Minister Gordon Coates devalued the New Zealand pound by 14 per cent against the British pound sterling. This served as a boon for farmers, as exports sold for sterling could be converted into a greater amount of domestic currency. However, as pound sterling coinage in New Zealand was devalued relative to the same coins' value in Britain, a resulting wave of currency smuggling caused a massive decline in the amount of British silver coins available in New Zealand. The devalued pound sterling coinage in circulation in New Zealand was smuggled into Australia and the United Kingdom through various means, including emptied gas cylinders and the oil sumps of cars and motorcycles. Smugglers shipped cases of silver coins to Britain in refrigerators labelled as "frozen duck".

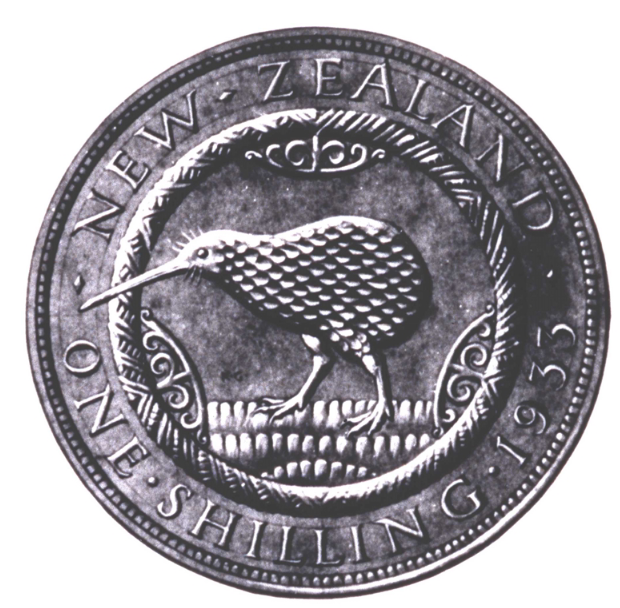
A pattern shilling by Kruger Gray, one of several designs approved by the Royal Mint, but vetoed by Coates' Coinage Committee.

As a result of smuggling and devaluation, large amounts of British silver coinage had left the country, and untendered Australian coinage rapidly took its place as the primary silver coinage in circulation. By June 1933, Canadian and American quarters had entered circulation in place of the now absent British shillings. Urged by Coates, the High Commission approached the Royal Mint again in April 1933 to ask how long a new coinage would take to enter production. Robert Johnson recognised the urgency of the economic situation and gave a rough figure of six months to begin minting the coinage, estimating coinage to arrive in New Zealand by January 1934. The government announced the impending creation of New Zealand pound coinage and appointed a Coinage Committee to organise the design and production of the coinage with the Royal Mint.

Announcements of a national coinage and an agreement with the Royal Mint passed in the 1932–1933 Finance Act, led to calls from various politicians and local organisations, including the New Zealand Manufacturers' Federation for coinage to instead be produced domestically, to provide a steady source of employment for local workers. Statements by the Coinage Committee that no domestic facilities existed for minting capabilities were refuted by local engineering firms, with one citing their production of 750,000 milk tokens for Wellington. Walter Nash advocated in Parliament in favour of domestic minting due to the potential of providing local employment. Such proposals were met with ridicule by the Royal Mint, who suggested that switching to local or private minting would cause significant delays and costs. Robert Johnson described the proposal for a domestic mint as "economic nationalism run mad".

The Coinage Committee considered recommending a decimalised coinage, but ultimately chose to continue the same denominations as circulating Imperial silver coinage: the threepence, sixpence, shilling, florin, and half-crown. The Coinage Act 1933 would outline the denominations, as well as their weight and acceptable degree of variation from this standard. A sixth 'crown' denomination was outlined in the act, but no coins of this denomination would be minted until the Waitangi crown in 1935, and none would circulate until a commemorative issue in 1949.

=== Design conflicts ===
While the Association of New Zealand Art Societies offered to facilitate a domestic competition for coinage design, the New Zealand government instead contracted the artists of the Royal Mint to design the coinage. While the obverse of the initial coinage series shows a crowned bust of George V by Percy Metcalfe, previously used in the coinage of Southern Rhodesia, the Royal Mint's Advisory Committee reviewed various designs for the reverses of each denomination by Metcalfe and George Kruger Gray. Metcalfe's designs were mainly rejected by the Advisory Committee in favour of Gray's work, although several were iterated upon by Gray.

Gordon Coates was described as the de facto prime minister during Prime Minister George Forbes' extended stays in Britain. Political conflict between the two led to separate committees: the New Zealand–based Coinage Committee (appointed by Coates) separately approved various separate designs for the coins' reverses, seeking to create a distinct national character with the coinage. A prolonged disagreement followed between Coates and Deputy Master of the Royal Mint Robert Johnson over which series of designs would be produced, with the latter attempting to stall until Forbes' return to New Zealand in October 1933. Coates however conceded to the Coinage Committee's recommendations, and the reverse designs were put into production beginning over the following months. The first domestic coins to reach the country were a shipment of half-crowns which began to circulate in Auckland and Wellington in late November 1933. Other denominations, all dated 1933, followed over the succeeding months, with shillings finally reaching the country on 3 April 1934. New Zealand was the last British dominion to issue its own national coinage, and British coins (besides pennies and halfpennies) lost their status as legal tender on 1 February 1935.

=== Copper coinage ===
To mark the hundredth anniversary of the Treaty of Waitangi in 1940, three new coins were introduced: the halfpenny, penny, and a commemorative centennial half-crown. The introduction of the bronze denominations had been outlined by the Coinage Act 1933, but was not considered a high priority by the government due to the presence of imperial pennies and halfpennies. By 1936, the New Zealand Numismatic Society had agreed to press for the introduction of such coinage for the celebrations of the Waitangi centennial. New Zealand artist Leonard Cornwall Mitchell won design competitions for the penny and halfpenny, as well as for the commemorative half-crown. Following revisions by Percy Metcalfe, these coins were issued for 1940, although some 1940 dated pennies entered circulation in late 1939 to resolve increasing shortages of copper coinage. Unlike the initial designs of 1933, or the decimalisation redesigns of 1967, these new coins received relatively little contemporary attention.

In 1947, due to increasing prices of silver and corresponding minting charges, the previously silver coinage began to be minted in cupronickel. A 1949 crown issue, circulated to commemorate a proposed but ultimately unrealised royal visit by King George VI, was the last silver coin issued for circulation in New Zealand. Another circulating commemorative crown, struck in cupronickel, was issued in 1953 to commemorate the coronation of Elizabeth II.

=== Proof coinage ===
Two sets of New Zealand pound proof coinage were produced and distributed to collectors, containing a proof coin of each denomination, alongside a commemorative crown coin. The first was initially intended to be dated 1933, but was delayed until 1935 due to design conflicts over the Waitangi crown. This 1935 or 'Waitangi' proof set was produced in tiny quantities, with only 364 sets produced. 100 of these were sold in leather cases, while the remainder was sold in simple cardboard boxes. These proof sets were sold in both Britain and New Zealand, although all coins in New Zealand were placed in unsecured cardboard boxes, alongside empty leather cases. The proof sets were sold for considerably high prices in New Zealand, and a low number of orders placed for the sets was attributed to economic difficulties in the waning years of the Great Depression. A second proof set including the Coronation crown produced to commemorate the coronation of Queen Elizabeth II, with a mintage of 7,000 pieces.

== Denominations ==
Coin denominations
Image		Name	Value	Technical parameters			Edge	Description	Designer	Date of issue
Obverse	Reverse	Name	Value	Diameter	Mass	Composition	Edge	Description	Designer	Date of issue
		Halfpenny	1/2d	1 inch (25.5 mm)	5.67 g	97% copper, 2.5% zinc, 0.5% tin	Plain	A hei-tiki (a greenstone Māori neck pendant)	Leonard C. Mitchell	1940
		Penny	1d	1.25 inches (31.75 mm)	9.45 g	97% copper, 2.5% zinc, 0.5% tin	Plain	A tūī surrounded by kōwhai blossoms	Leonard C. Mitchell	1940
		Threepence	3d	0.642 inches (16.3 mm)	1.41 g	1933–1946: 50% silver, 50% cupronickel; 1947–1965: 75% copper, 25% nickel	Plain	Two crossed patu clubs	George Kruger Gray	1933
		Sixpence	6d	0.765 inches (19.43 mm)	2.83 g	1933–1946: 50% silver, 50% cupronickel; 1947–1965: 75% copper, 25% nickel	Milled	A huia	George Kruger Gray	1933
		Shilling	1s (12d)	0.931 inches (23.65 mm)	5.66 g	1933–1946: 50% silver, 50% cupronickel; 1947–1965: 75% copper, 25% nickel	Milled	A crouched Māori warrior holding a taiaha	George Kruger Gray	1933
		Florin	2s	1.126 inches (28.60 mm)	11.31 g	1933–1946: 50% silver, 50% cupronickel; 1947–1965: 75% copper, 25% nickel	Milled	A kiwi	George Kruger Gray	1933
		Half-crown	2.5s	1.272 inches (32.30 mm)	14.14 g	1933–1946: 50% silver, 50% cupronickel; 1947–1965: 75% copper, 25% nickel	Milled	The coat of arms of New Zealand, ornamented with whakairo, traditional Māori woodcarving	George Kruger Gray	1933
		Crown	5s	1.525 inches (38.74 mm)	28.28 g	1933, 1949: 50% silver, 50% cupronickel; 1953: 75% copper, 25% nickel	Milled	Commemorative only		1935, 1949, 1953
These images are to scale at 2.5 pixels per millimetre. For table standards, see the coin specification table.

== Commemorative coinage ==
Four commemorative issues were produced, of which all except the Waitangi crown entered general circulation. The Waitangi crown was minted in extremely limited qualities, and was sold to collectors by itself, or as part of a proof set.

Commemorative coins of the New Zealand pound
Image		Name	Value	Technical parameters			Edge	Description	Designer	Mintage	Date of issue
Obverse	Reverse	Name	Value	Diameter	Mass	Composition	Edge	Description	Designer	Mintage	Date of issue
		Centennial half-crown	2.5s	1.272 inches (32.30 mm)	14.14 g	50% silver 50% cupronickel	Milled	A Māori woman standing, with a wharepuni (principal house of a Māori village) and pūhara (an elevated platform elected within a pa stockade) to her left. The woman wears a piupiu. Tall modern buildings are to her right.	Leonard C. Mitchell	100,800	1940
		Waitangi crown	5s	1.525 inches (38.74 mm)	28.28 g	50% silver 50% cupronickel	Milled	Tāmati Wāka Nene shaking hands with William Hobson, standing under a royal crown. The chief holds a taiaha and wears a piupiu.	James Berry, Percy Metcalfe	1,128	1935
		Royal visit crown	5s	1.525 inches (38.74 mm)	28.28 g	50% silver 50% cupronickel	Milled	A fern leaf frond surrounded by the four stars of the Southern Cross.	James Berry	200,020	1949
		Coronation crown	5s	1.525 inches (38.74 mm)	28.28 g	75% copper, 25% nickel	Milled	The initials EiiR of Queen Elizabeth II, with Royal Crown and whakairo carving, surrounded by the four stars of the Southern Cross.	Robert M. Conly	257,000	1953
These images are to scale at 2.5 pixels per millimetre. For table standards, see the coin specification table.

== Decimalisation ==
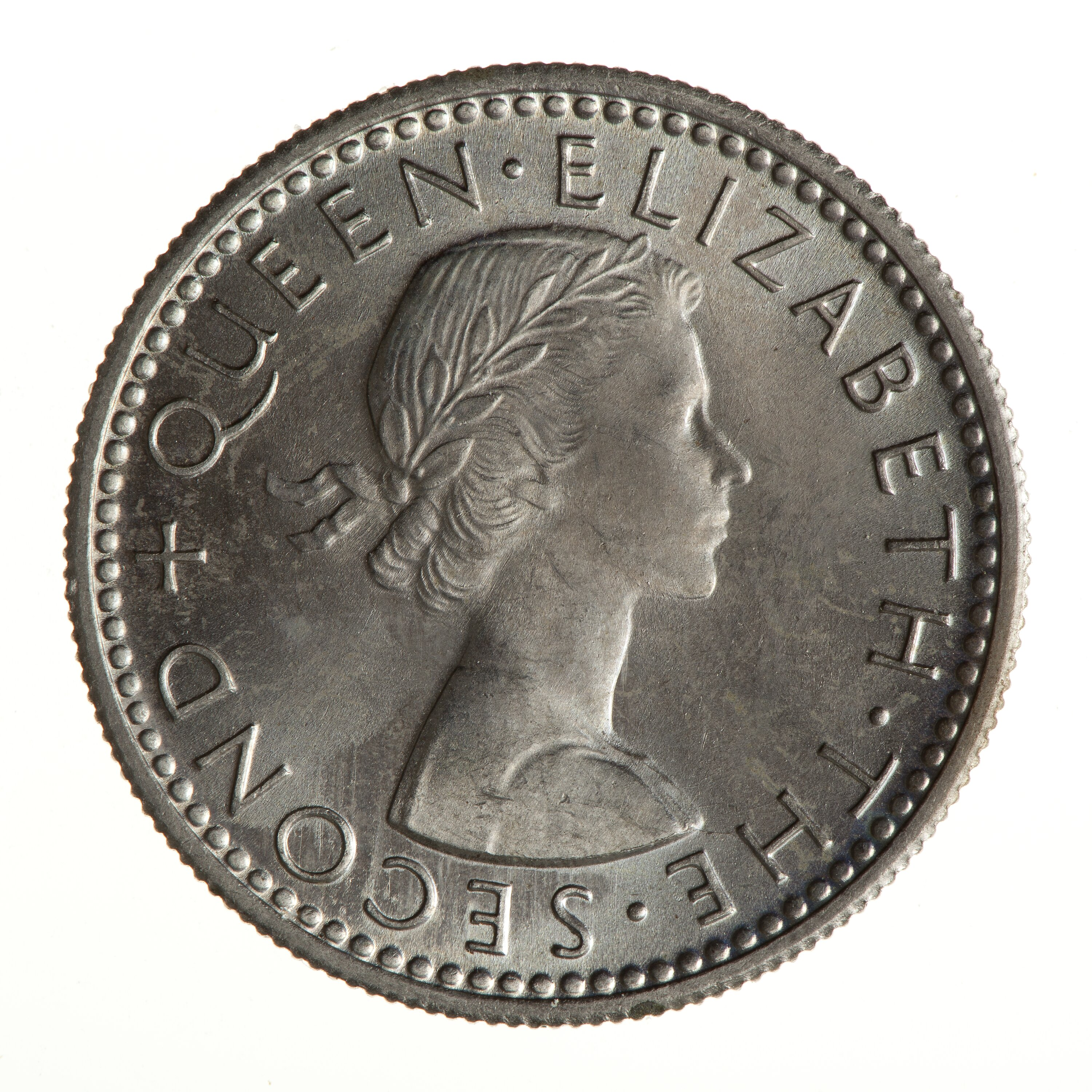
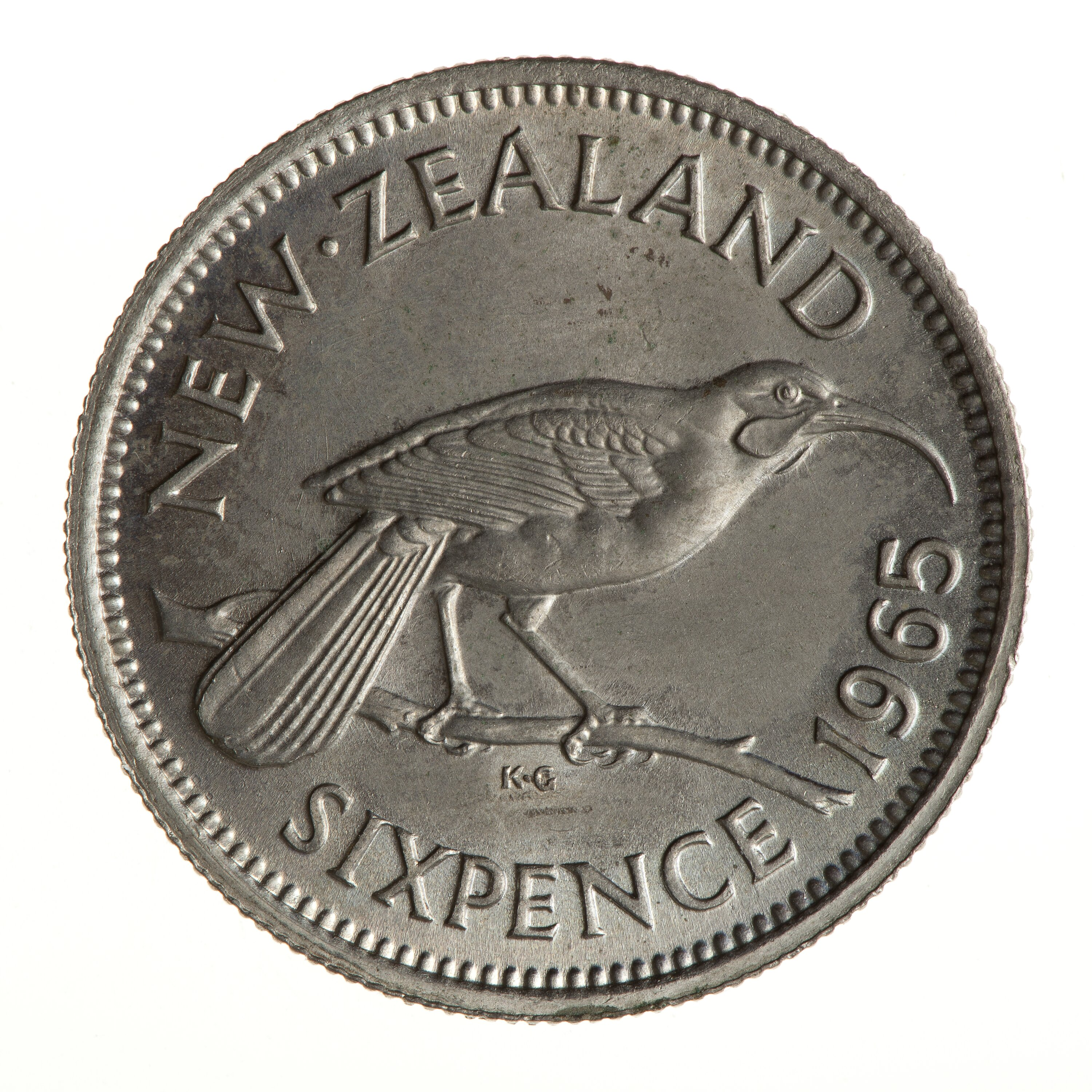
A sixpence from 1965, the last year pound coinage was minted

A decimal currency was first proposed in New Zealand in August 1908, with an Otago Institute address calling for the creation of a pound currency divided into ten florins, each of ten brons, each of ten tennies. Decimalisation was considered but ultimately rejected by the Coinage Committee in 1933. However, future possibilities for decimalisation were kept open in maintaining the crown as a nominal denomination, due to the potential for a crown and cent decimal system.

Labour MP Rex Mason introduced various bills supporting decimalisation during the 1950s while in opposition. National joined support for decimalisation in the late 50s, with both parties supporting it during the 1960 general elections. A government committee formed in 1957 to research the possibility reported favourably on the potential economic effects. Greater efficiency was a primary factor for the change, albeit offset by the cost of public education and the production of new coinage. National announced that decimalisation would proceed in 1963, and passed the Decimal Currency Act 1964.

The Act standardised a new currency, the New Zealand dollar, divided into 100 cents. Its value was based on that of the prior coinage, with one shilling being equal to the new value of ten cents. Eight denominations of coin were defined, ranging from one dollar to one half cent. Upon taking effect on 10 July 1967, the Act abolished the pound. While the halfpenny, penny, and threepence coins were withdrawn, the sixpence, shilling, and florin coins remained legal tender until 31 October 2006 with the withdrawal of the five-cent coin and the introduction of smaller-size 10, 20, and 50-cent coins.

== See also ==
- Coins of the Australian dollar
- Coins of the Australian pound
