= Half-crown (New Zealand coin) =

Former denomination of the New Zealand pound

- New Zealand
- Value: 2½s (£NZ)
- Mass: 14.14 g
- Diameter: 32 mm
- Edge: Milled
- Composition: 1933–1946: 50% silver, 50% quaternary alloy 1947–1965: cupronickel (75% copper, 25% nickel)
- Years of minting: 1933–1965

Obverse
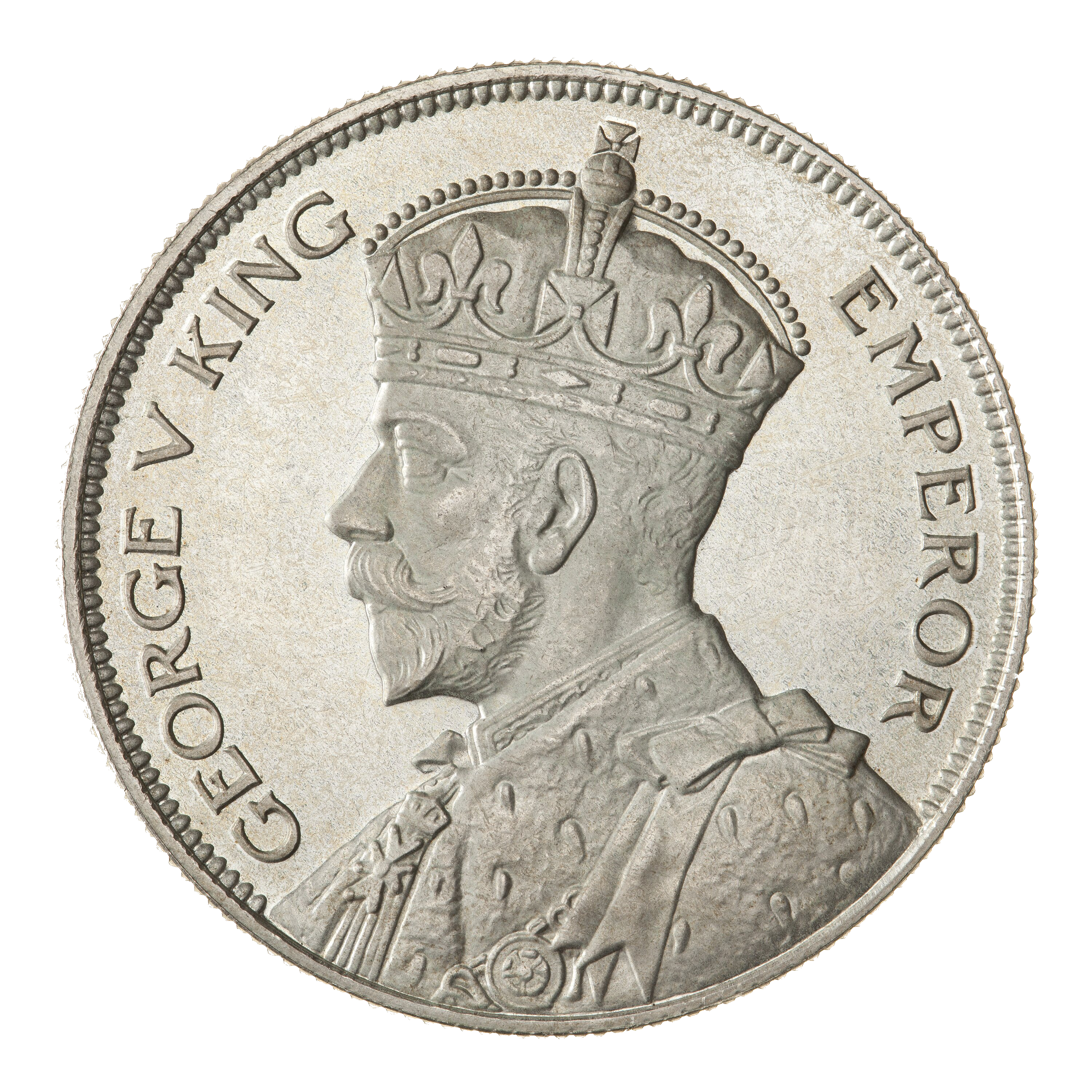
- Design: Crowned bust of George V
- Designer: Percy Metcalfe

Reverse
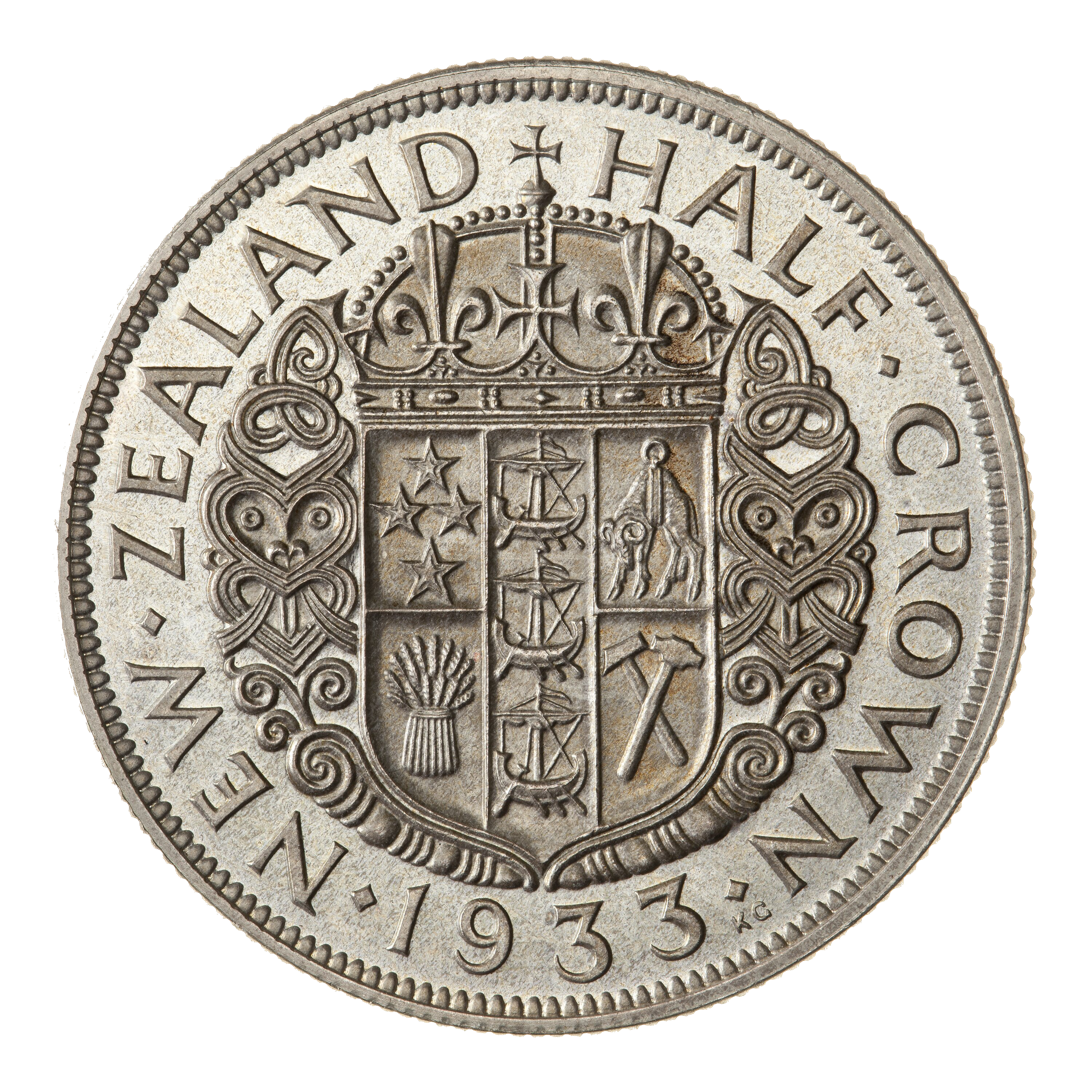
- Design: The coat of arms of New Zealand, surrounded by Māori carvings.
- Designer: George Kruger Gray

The half-crown is the largest of five denominations of New Zealand pound coinage first issued in 1933. Introduced due to shortages of comparable British silver coinage following the devaluation of the New Zealand pound relative to the pound sterling, the coin measures roughly 32 mm (1.3 in) in diameter. It is equal in value to half a crown, i.e. two and a half shillings, or thirty pence, or an eighth of a pound.

Designed by George Kruger Gray, the coin's reverse features the New Zealand coat of arms surrounded by Māori wood carvings. Quickly approved by design committees in Britain and New Zealand to resolve the local currency shortage, the coin was the first denomination of New Zealand coinage to enter circulation. It was initially struck by the Royal Mint as half-ounce (14.14 gram) coins of .500 fineness silver, but was produced in cupronickel from 1947 onward. A commemorative issue, celebrating the centennial of the Treaty of Waitangi, entered circulation in 1940.

== Background ==
British half-crowns first circulated in New Zealand during the early 19th century alongside various other silver coinage, including American, Spanish, French, and Dutch issues alongside other British silver denominations. The British pound sterling was confirmed as legal tender in 1858, but had in effect been the sole circulating currency since 1847. Gold half sovereigns, equivalent in value to ten shillings, entered production in Australia in the 1850s, and were made legal tender (although they would not be legal tender within the United Kingdom itself until 1864). Widespread circulation of the Australian silver coinage in New Zealand began in 1930, when Australia devalued the Australian pound relative to the pound sterling. Large amounts of the devalued Australian currency began to flood into New Zealand, eventually making up 30–40% of all coinage in circulation by early 1933. The counterfeiting of silver coins also increased during this period.

New Zealand followed in devaluing the New Zealand pound in 1933, triggering mass smuggling of silver coinage to Britain and its other colonial possessions. After several decades of proposals, the New Zealand government pursued the creation of a domestic coinage the same year. The Coinage Act 1933, outlined the weights and sizes of the six denominations of New Zealand silver coinage, defining the shilling as a coin with a weight of 5.66 grams (0.200 oz). The shilling was worth twelve pence or half a florin. Although domestic firms offered to produce the coinage, the New Zealand government deemed that domestic facilities were not sufficient for mass production, and contracted with the Royal Mint for minting.

== Design ==
All coinage obverses from the initial 1933 issue featured a crowned bust of George V designed by Royal Mint designer Percy Metcalfe, initially for use on the Southern Rhodesian pound. This was based on an older crowned bust by Australian sculptor Bertram Mackennal, used on the coinage of other British colonies and dominions. Reverse designs were a matter of collaboration between the Royal Mint Advisory Committee, headed by Deputy Master Robert Johnson, and the New Zealand government. Local artists and members of the New Zealand Numismatic Society were consulted throughout the design process, but British designers were tasked with creating an initial series of designs, despite requests from local art societies for domestic artistry of the coins. Metcalfe and George Kruger Gray were experienced artists who had each previously designed coinage for several other British dominions and colonies. The two were tasked to submit designs for each of the five initial silver denominations of coinage.

A full achievement of the coat of arms was rejected by Kruger Gray for its complexity.

Both Metcalfe and Kruger Gray submitted plaster models for the half-crown. Both were based on the coat of arms of New Zealand, but the Advisory Committee strongly preferred Kruger Gray's rendering, only requiring minor modifications to the text positioning. With a woodcut motif inspired by koruru carvings, the design was later commended for combining Pākehā and Māori iconography. The coin, with modified lettering, was approved on 18 July 1933.

New Zealand's prime minister George Forbes held a very weak premiership, and finance minister Gordon Coates served as de facto acting prime minister, especially during Forbes' extended stays in Britain. In July 1933, Coates appointed a Coinage Design Committee, composed of various local artists alongside members of the New Zealand Numismatic Society. Coates's committee advocated for the full achievement of arms, including supporters, to be depicted on the half-crown. This was considered unacceptable to Kruger Gray, who wrote that there was "far too much in it to make this possible and even if it were done the result would be most unsatisfactory from both the artistic and practical points of view." Coates ultimately approved Kruger Gray's design in August, due to the pressing shortage of high denomination silver coinage. The coin would be the only of Kruger Gray's designs to be approved by Coates without modification.

The first shipment of half-crowns, £250,000 in face value, was en route to New Zealand by early November. Throughout November, Coates attempted to push the Coinage Act, 1933 through Parliament, retroactively authorising their production and assigning the coins as legal tender. Although parliamentary debate continued on the coins' design and the need for a distinct national currency, the bill was passed on 27 November. The shipment arrived three weeks later, and quickly entered circulation.

== Reception ==
Coates gave a description of the coin to the public on 5 November 1933, with a reproduction of the design appearing in the Auckland Weekly News two days later. The Dominion praised the coin's sharpness and "exquisite finish", as well as the quaternary alloy used in the coin's production. The Evening Post featured an interview with numismatist Allan Sutherland describing the design process, praising the design as a "happy blending of heraldic and native features", as well as the detail of Metcalfe's obverse. Although lauding the coin in the interview, Sutherland privately wrote that the reverse design was overcrowded.

Considerable religious opposition emerged to the coin's omission of Dei Gratia and Fidei Defensor from the King's listed titles. The New Zealand Baptist declared the removal as reflecting the atheistic attitudes of the New Zealand government. The Federation of New Zealand Justices called for the return of the Latin mottoes to future coinage. Treasury Secretary Alexander Park relayed to the press that the omission was approved by the King, with the titles having been removed on the coinage of all dominions except Australia. British politician John Sandeman Allen raised the issue to the New Zealand Parliament while visiting in late 1934, but no action was taken to modify the titles.

== Centennial commemorative ==
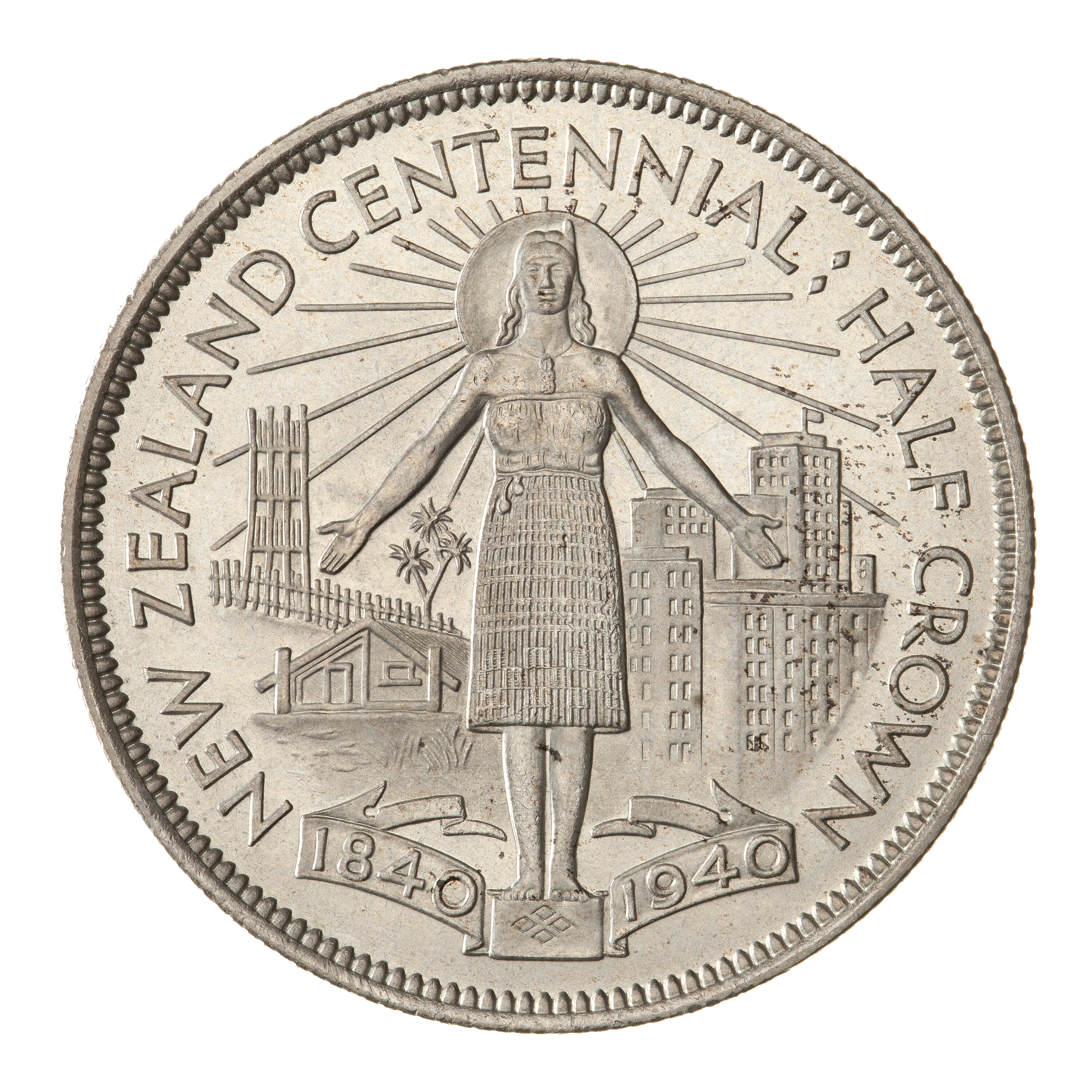
The reverse of the Centennial half-crown features a Māori woman flanked by traditional and modern architecture.

New Zealand's first commemorative coin, the Waitangi crown, faced a lengthy design and production process, and was ultimately unpopular with collectors. These delays and difficulties encouraged the longer-term planning of future commemorative coins. By August 1936, the New Zealand Numismatic Society began pursuing the creation of commemorative coinage to be issued for the hundredth anniversary of the Treaty of Waitangi, seen as a centennial for the country itself. Allan Sutherland proposed the creation of a commemorative half-crown to be released into circulation at face value. The government was receptive to the Society's proposal, and cooperated with it to design the commemorative issue. Commemorative issues for other denominations such as the florin were rejected in favour of the larger half-crown.

From late August 1938 to the end of September, a competition was held for the design of the commemorative half-crown, as well as for the proposed penny and halfpenny denominations. Metcalfe and Kruger Gray both submitted designs for the half-crown, but Leonard Cornwall Mitchell's designs were selected for all three denominations. His half-crown design featured a Māori woman in piupiu standing with her arms outstretched, surrounded by traditional Māori architecture on her right, a modern cityscape on her left, and a rising sun behind her head. The Royal Mint's task of transferring Mitchell's sketch to coinage proved troublesome. The design of the piupiu was simplified to a less authentic vertical pattern. High Commissioner Jordan approved the coin in August 1939, and the coin entered production. The coin was relatively popular to the public, and had almost entirely disappeared from circulation by 1941.

== Mintage and production ==
Mintage figures of the half-crown varied over its period in circulation; many years saw no half-crowns issued, including a seven-year stretch from 1954 to 1960. No half-crowns of the "regular" design were issued in 1940, when the centennial commemorative was issued.

Half-crowns are approximately 32.3 mm in diameter and 14.14 grams (a half ounce) in weight. Initially struck in .500 fineness, the coins were made with cupronickel from 1947 onward. Many were recalled from circulation by banks and melted for their silver content. The half-crown was abolished in 1967 and replaced by the 50 cent coin in the same diameter and mass, one of the new denominations of the New Zealand dollar.

George V half-crown mintage
1933	1934	1935	1936
2,000,000	2,720,000	612,000	0

George VI half-crown mintage
1937	1938	1939	1940	1941	1942	1943	1944	1945	1946	1947	1948	1949	1950	1951	1952
672,000	0	0	100,800 (Note: Mintage figures for the centennial half-crown commemorative.)	776,000	240,000	1,120,000	180,000	420,000	960,000	1,600,000	1,400,000	2,800,000	3,600,000	1,200,000	0

Elizabeth II half-crown mintage
1953	1954	1955	1956	1957	1958	1959	1960	1961	1962	1963	1964	1965
120,000	0	0	0	0	0	0	0	80,000	600,000	400,000	0	1,400,000
