= Wellington City Milk-supply Act 1919 =

Act of Parliament in New Zealand

New Zealand Parliament
- Long title: An Act to confer Additional Powers on the Corporation of the City of Wellington in relation to the Inspection and Control of the Milk-supply of the City of Wellington and other Matters.
- Royal assent: 4 November 1919

Legislative history
- Passed: 1919
- Status: Current legislation

The Wellington Milk-Supply Act is an Act of Parliament passed in New Zealand in 1919. The Act regulates the sale of milk in Wellington City and is an example of a strange law as it is considered obsolete in the current New Zealand legal context.

== History of the Act ==
The Wellington Milk-Supply Act was originally enacted in response to concerns over the quality of milk being supplied to Wellington residents, and the high cost of fresh milk due to a spike in export prices for dairy products during World War I. Under the Act, Wellington City Council took complete control over the treatment and distribution of milk in Wellington through the Municipal Milk Department, established in 1918.

The Municipal Milk Department pioneered several innovations including a guaranteed system of milk supply, payment to farmers on a quality rather than quantity basis (percentage of milk-fat per gallon), pasteurisation, the introduction of milk tokens, zoning of milk rounds, and developing a tanker transport system.

The Municipal Milk Department continued to operate as a branch of the Council until 1987 when its legal status changed to a Local Authority Trading Enterprise (a council-owned company) known as Capital Dairy Products Ltd (CDP).

CDP continued to operate until the Council agreed to sell its shares in the company to Tui Milk Products in February 1991. Tui merged with Kiwi Cooperative Dairies in 1996 and the resulting company amalgamated with the NZ Dairy Group in 2001 to form Fonterra.

== 2021 application for a milk licence ==
In 2021, Wellington lawyer Tyrone Barugh featured in local media after pursuing legal action against Wellington City Council when it declined his application for a milk licence under the Act. The Council's response to Barugh's application indicated that, in their view, the law was "deprecated". In a follow up letter, the Council justified their decision on three grounds:

1. The Wellington Milk-Supply Act had been implicitly repealed by the Dairy Industry Restructuring Act 2001 and granting a licence would undermine the new legislation.
2. Granting a licence would run contrary to the stated purpose of the licencing regime, which is "securing for the inhabitants of the city an adequate supply of milk of good quality and at a reasonable price". The Council argued that granting a licence would reduce the security of Wellington's milk supply.
3. If the Council did possess the power to issue licences under the Act, Barugh's application lacked sufficient detail to support the granting of one.

Barugh lodged an appeal with the High Court against the decision but later withdrew this after the Council threatened to pursue the applicant for legal costs.

== Sources ==
This article incorporates text from a free content work. Licensed under Creative Commons Attribution 4.0 International licence (license statement/permission). Text taken from Back when Council played milkman, Wellington City Council.
