= Half crown =

Half crown may refer to:

- Half crown (British coin), a pre-decimalisation coin of the United Kingdom
- Half crown (Irish coin), a pre-decimalisation coin of Ireland
- Half-crown (New Zealand coin)

== See also ==
- Half a Crown (novel)
