= NZP =

NZP may refer to:

- New Zealand pound
- New Zealand Police
- National Zoological Park (United States)
