= Dairy Industry Restructuring Act 2001 =

Act of Parliament in New Zealand

New Zealand Parliament
- Royal assent: 26 September 2001

Legislative history
- Passed: 2001
- Status: Current legislation

The Dairy Industry Restructuring Act is an Act of Parliament passed in New Zealand in 2001.

The Act authorised the amalgamation of New Zealand's two largest dairy co-operatives - New Zealand Co-operative Dairy Company Ltd and Kiwi Co-operative Dairies Ltd - into Fonterra Co-operative Group Limited and the resulting ownership by Fonterra of all the shares in the New Zealand Dairy Board.

In order to prevent the monopoly position of Fonterra from being anticompetitive the Act requires an open entry and exit of farmers into and out of the co-operative, and up to 600 million litres of raw milk made available to competitors. These are used in conjunction with the Commerce Act 1986.

The Act is administered by the Ministry for Primary Industries.

== See also ==
- Dairy farming in New Zealand
- Wellington City Milk-supply Act 1919
