= Harry Linley Richardson =

New Zealand artist, art teacher and stamp designer (1878–1947)

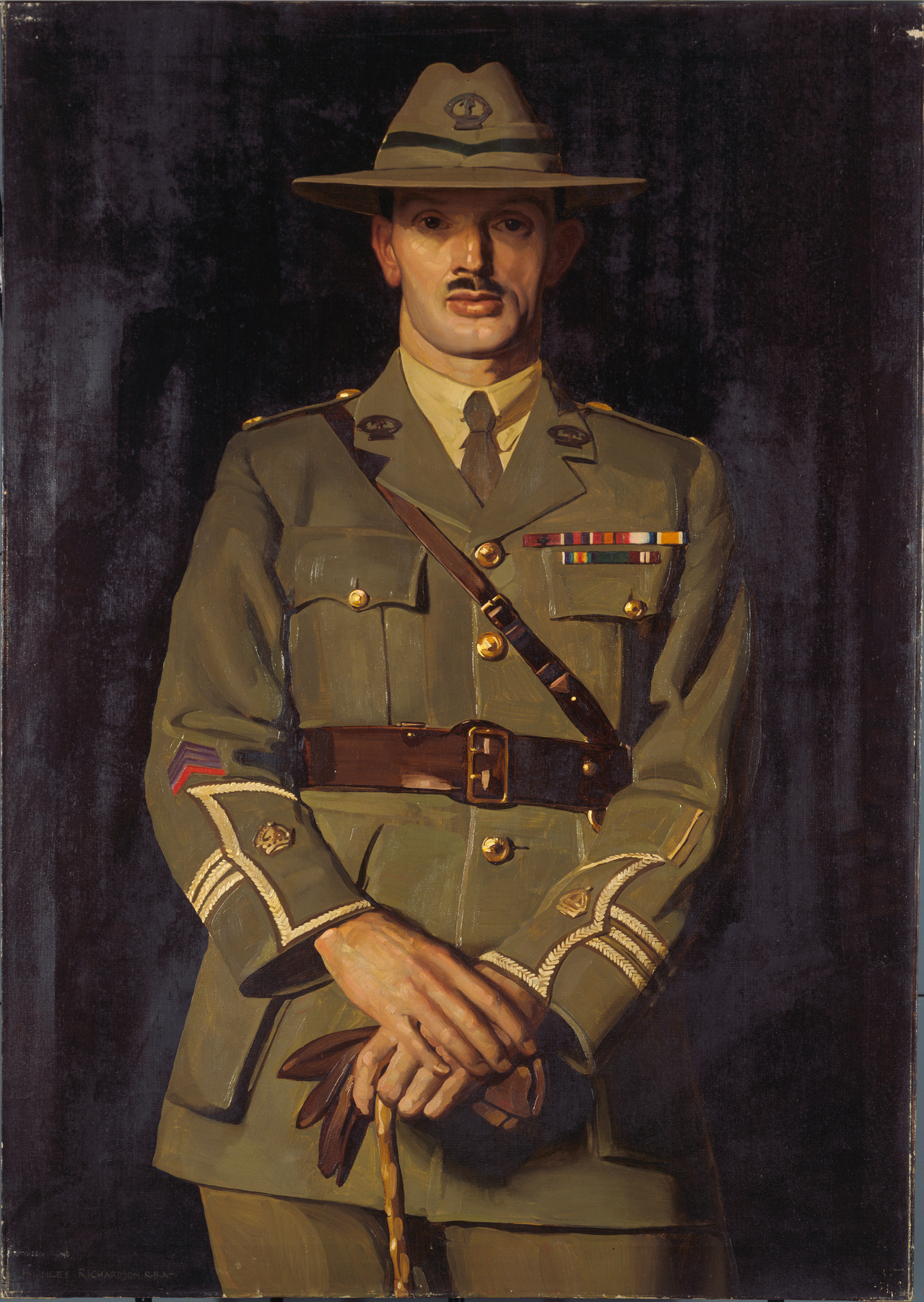
1920 painting by Harry Linley Richardson of William James Hardham

Harry Linley Richardson (1878–1947) was a New Zealand artist and art teacher, stamp designer. He was born in Peckham Rye, Surrey, England on 19 October 1878.
