= Halfpenny (New Zealand coin) =

Former denomination of New Zealand currency

- New Zealand
- Value: 1/2d; 1/480 pound
- Mass: 5.67 g
- Diameter: 25.5 mm
- Edge: Plain

Obverse
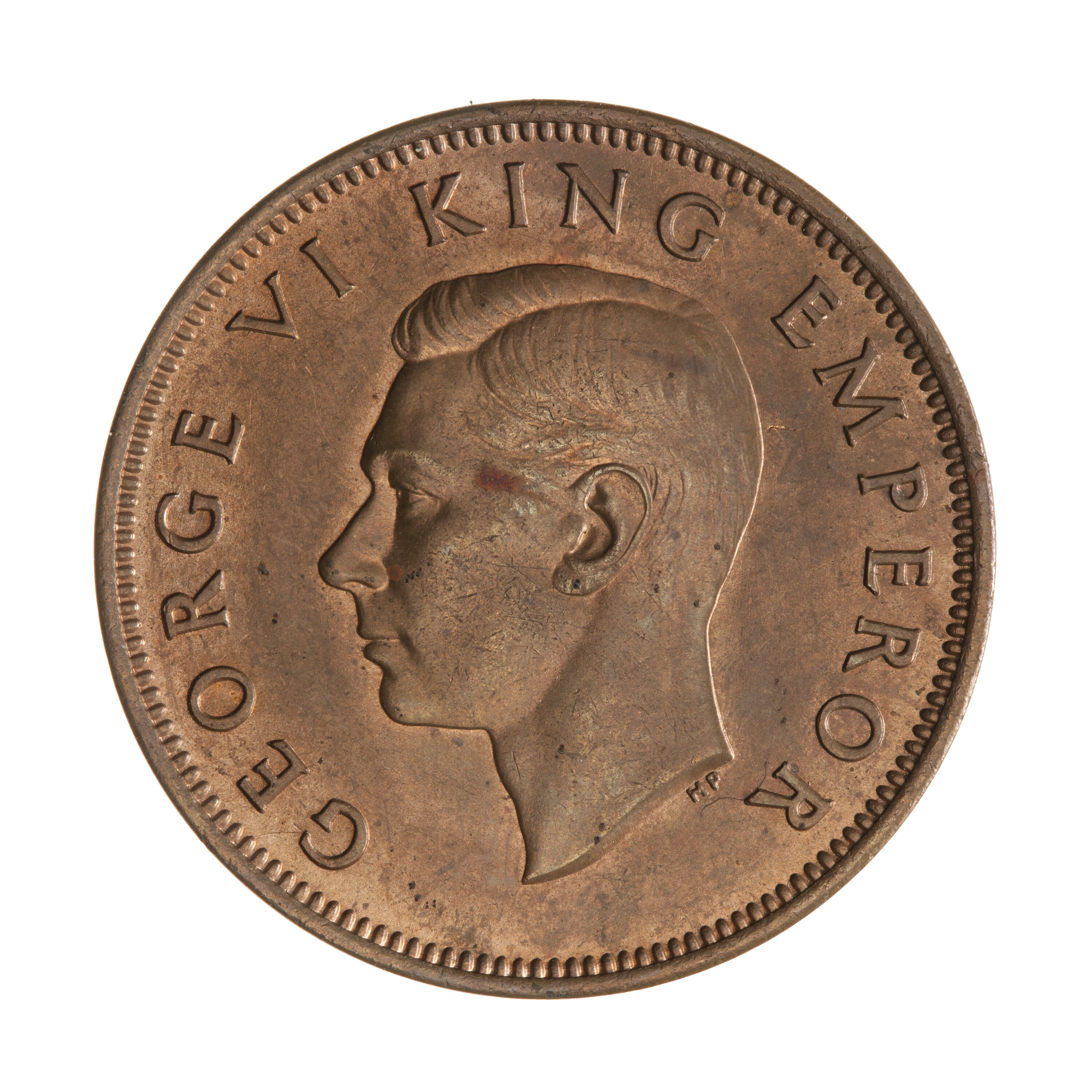
- Design: Profile portrait of George VI
- Designer: Humphrey Paget

Reverse
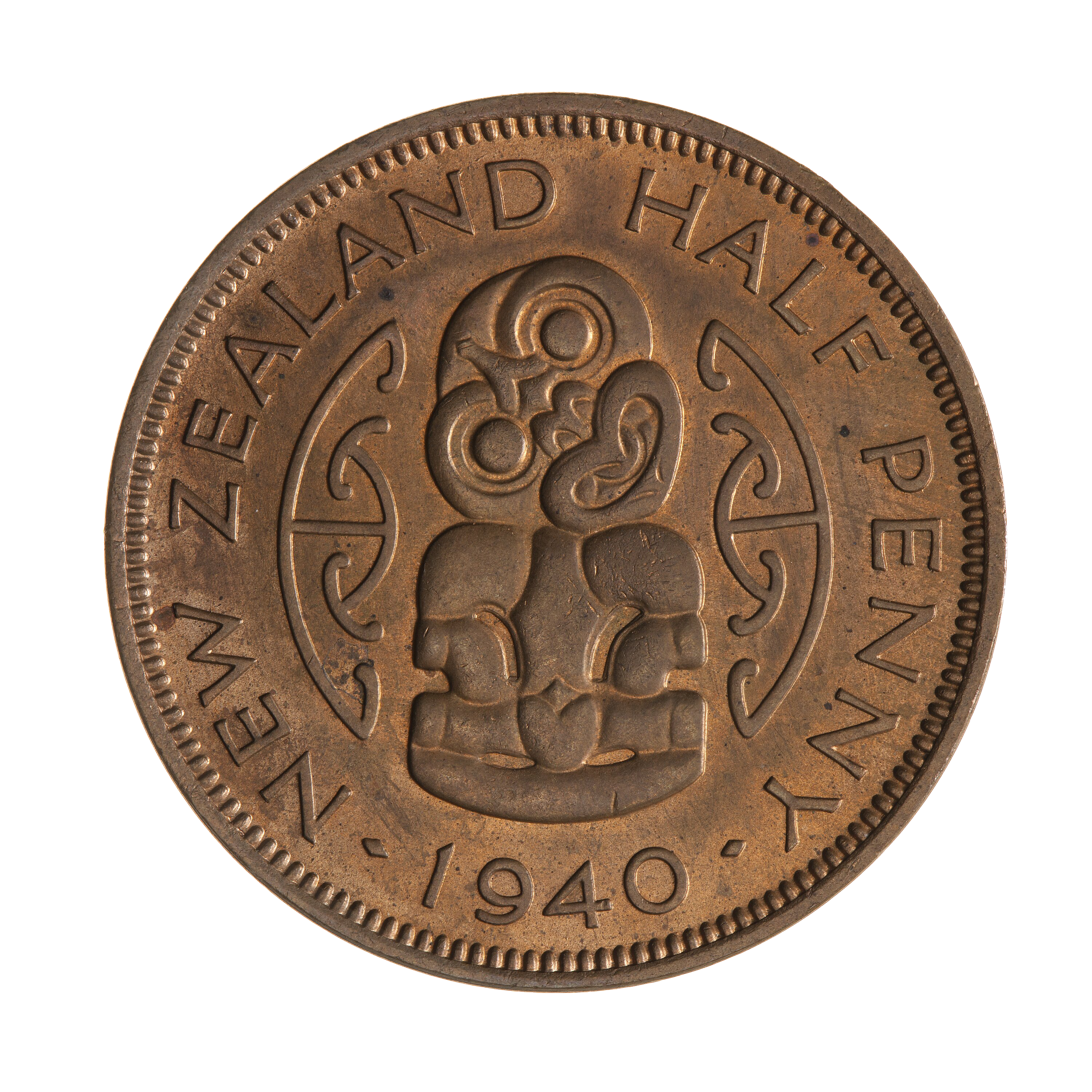
- Design: A hei-tiki with ornamental kowhaiwhai pattern on each side
- Designer: Leonard Cornwall Mitchell

The halfpenny was first issued in New Zealand in 1940, seven years after the first introduction of a domestic pound coinage. The coin's issuing was scheduled to align with the centennial of the Treaty of Waitangi and the New Zealand centennial, alongside the penny and centennial half-crown. The coin was designed by New Zealand artist Leonard Cornwall Mitchell after winning a government-sponsored design competition, and then modelled by Royal Mint designer Percy Metcalfe. The halfpenny features the head of the reigning monarch on the obverse, with a hei-tiki pendant ornamented and simplified kowhaiwhai woodcarvings on the reverse. The smallest of all denominations of the New Zealand pound, the copper coin was worth 1/480th of a pound, or 1/120th of a crown, the largest coinage denomination. It was discontinued alongside all other New Zealand currency following decimalisation in 1967.

== Background ==
The halfpenny was the second smallest denomination of the British pound sterling which saw circulation in New Zealand, alongside the farthing. While the pound was confirmed as legal tender in 1858, it had in effect been the sole circulating currency since 1847, after various foreign coinage was removed from circulation in the newly founded colony.

Beginning in 1857, significant shortages of small denominations of coinage led to the production of penny and halfpenny tokens by local traders. These tokens would form around half of copper coinage in circulation over the following decades. Minting of the tokens ceased in 1881 following rising availability of British copper coinage in the colony. The tokens were officially demonetised in 1897.

The sudden influx of large amounts of Australian coinage into New Zealand in the early 1930s, coupled with rampant currency smuggling in response to the devaluation of the New Zealand pound relative to the pound sterling, prompted the creation of a distinct national coinage. Silver coinage began circulating in 1933, but no immediate need was seen for the design or introduction of domestic pennies and halfpennies, as British copper coins were still in circulation as legal tender. The halfpenny was the smallest denomination of the pound; unlike in Britain, no farthing (¼ penny) denomination was produced.

== Design and introduction ==
A 1933 government report recommended the employment of domestic artists for future coinage of the New Zealand pound. Deputy Master of the Royal Mint Robert Johnson, writing to numismatist Allan Sutherland after the introduction of the first series of coinage in 1934, urged significant time to be spent on the designs of the penny and halfpenny in order to assure quality designs. The New Zealand Numismatic Society, although recommending in mid-1934 the speedy introduction of domestic copper coinage, did not seriously discuss it for several years after. By 1936, members were hesitant to press for an imminent introduction of pennies and halfpennies due to the possible institution of a decimalised currency, for which the coinage would be abolished in favour of a one cent piece. After an October 1937 meeting, a government-appointed Coinage Subcommittee issued a recommendation for the issue of a standard design for the penny and halfpenny to coincide with the New Zealand Centennial in 1940.

By June 1938, with the introduction of silver coinage featuring Humphrey Paget's portrait of George VI, the Numismatic Society again recommended the speedy introduction of the penny and halfpenny. The same month, Finance Minister Walter Nash appointed a new committee composed of various financial ministers and members of the Numismatic Society to consider designs for the new bronze coinage, alongside a commemorative half-crown issue for the centennial.

=== Design competition ===
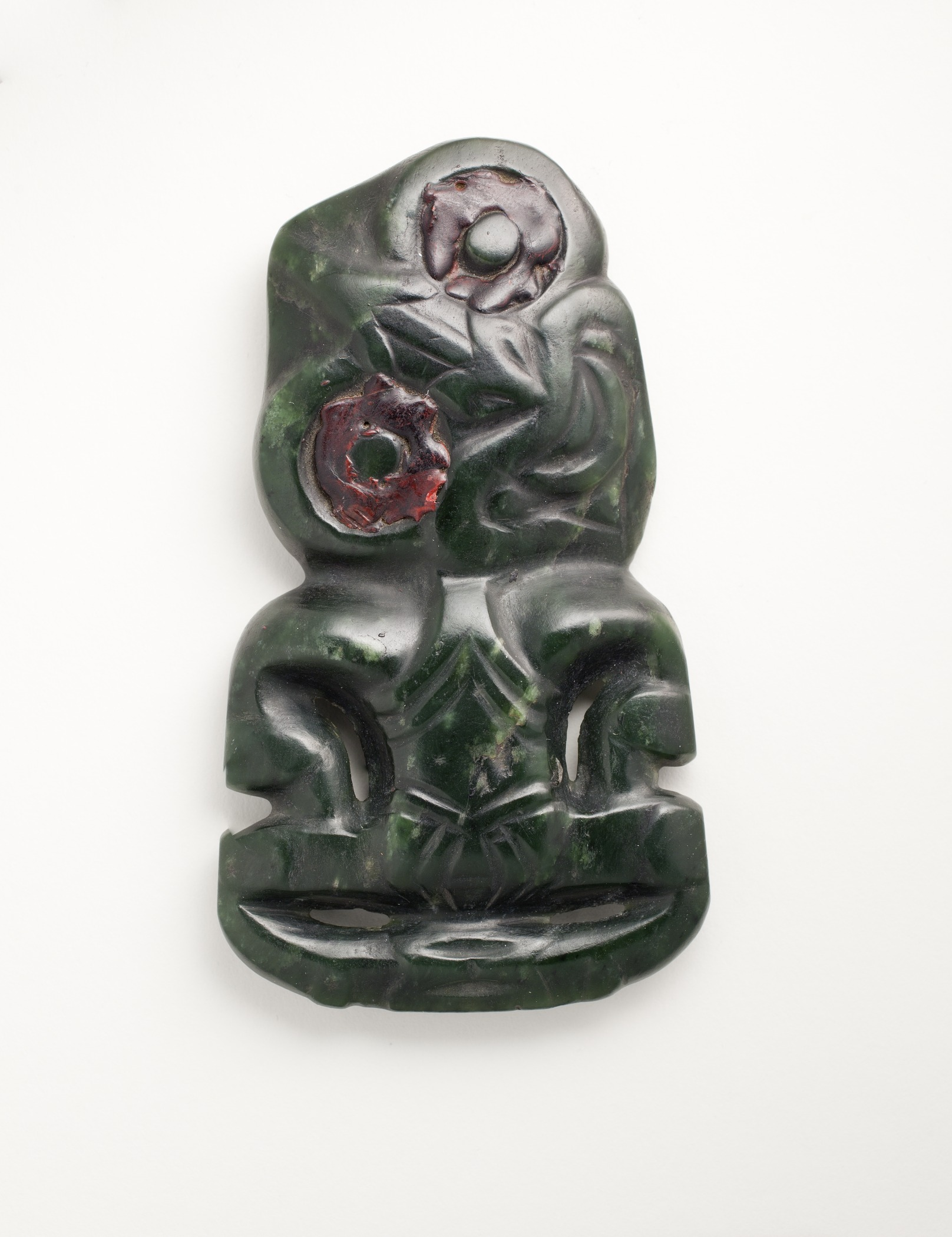
An 18th-century hei-tiki

Beginning in late August 1938, a competition was held for the reverse designs of the penny, halfpenny, and commemorative half-crown. A nominal prize of £25 was offered to the winning halfpenny design. Prospective artists had until the end of September to submit designs via to-scale sketches. Around twenty New Zealand artists submitted designs for the competition, although British Royal Mint designers Percy Metcalfe and George Kruger Gray were both granted permission to participate due to their work on the prior New Zealand coinage. Little outline was given for the design of the halfpenny, other than the inclusion of distinct New Zealand iconography and the text "New Zealand: Half Penny 1940". Artist and stamp designer James Berry submitted a relatively simplistic halfpenny design featuring a horizontal silver fern. Kruger Gray submitted two halfpenny designs. The first features a geyser flanked by two small hei-tiki, Māori greenstone pendants; his alternate design includes the head of a traditional taiaha staff. Metcalfe likewise submitted two halfpenny designs, both variations on the Southern Cross, with one featuring the Golden Fleece of the New Zealand coat of arms suspended from the top star.

=== Hei-tiki halfpenny ===
Leonard Cornwall Mitchell submitted a halfpenny design featuring a hei-tiki adapted from a rejected threepence reverse by George Kruger Gray. In 1933, Sutherland had managed to dissuade the Royal Mint from approving the threepence hei-tiki design, due to misconceptions of the figure as a fertility charm; some period sources claimed the symbol represented a "personified phallus". However, Sutherland's opinions towards the design warmed over time, and he recommended restoring the figure on a later issue of threepence. This proposal was shelved following the adoption of the hei-tiki figure in Mitchell's halfpenny design. Due to greater familiarity with Māori iconography, Mitchell was able to produce a more accurate figure flanked by simplified kowhaiwhai woodcarvings. Metcalfe adapted the sketches into a plaster model shown to the Royal Mint Advisory Committee, which had not previously seen Mitchell's sketches. Although the Advisory Committee recommended the removal or reduction of the woodcarving motif, an urgent request by the New Zealand government for the coinage to enter circulation prevented any redesign. The coin was approved by early July 1939 and entered production. Pattern strikes of the penny, halfpenny, and centennial half-crown were given to the Numismatic Society by James Elliott. Johannes Carl Andersen, chair of the Numismatic Society, spoke favourably of the coin's design. Sutherland, still wary of the alleged fertility associations of the hei-tiki, wrote that "the half-penny is not a popular coin in New Zealand".

== Mintage ==
25.5 mm in diameter and 87.5 grains (5.67 g) in weight, the coins were initially made of an alloy consisting of 95.5% copper, 1.5% zinc, and 3% tin. The alloy composition of the coin was changed in 1960 to include significantly less tin. In September 2023, a New Zealand halfpenny error coin that had text in Latin instead of English sold at auction for $19,000.

George VI Mintage
Date	1940	1941	1942	1943	1944	1945	1946	1947	1948	1949	1950	1951	1952
Mintage	3,432,000	960,000	1,920,000	0	2,035,000	1,516,000	3,120,000	2,726,000	0	1,766,400	1,425,600	2,342,400	2,400,000

Elizabeth II Mintage
Date	1953	1954	1955	1956	1957	1958	1959	1960	1961	1962	1963	1964	1965
Mintage	720,000	240,000	240,000	1,200,000	1,440,000	1,920,000	1,920,000	2,400,000	2,880,000	2,880,000	1,680,000	2,885,000	5,200,000
