= Milk token =

Token coins for milk payments

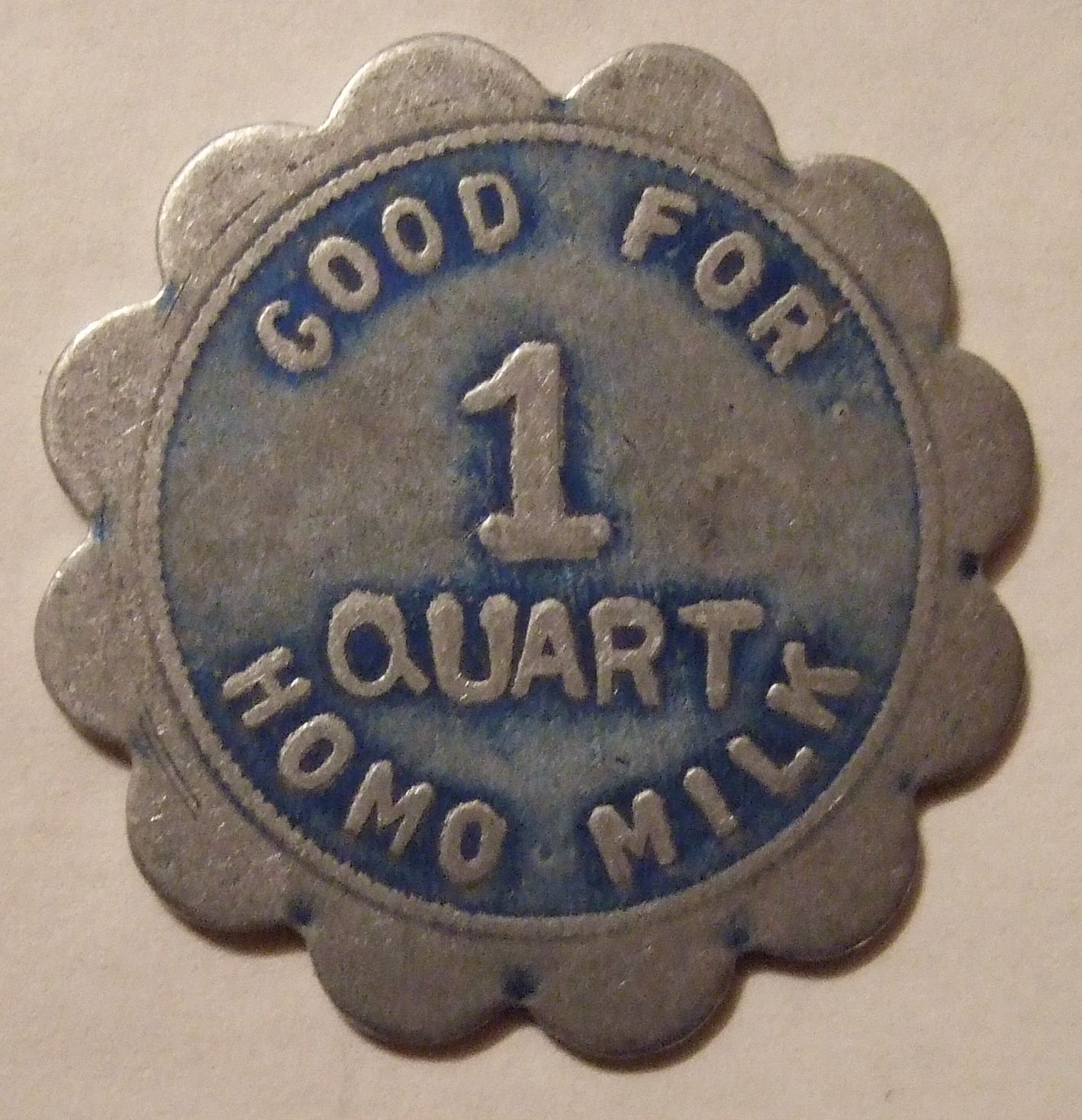
A Canadian milk token for 1 quart of homogenised milk

Milk tokens, also known as dairy tokens, were token coins used for the payment of milk deliveries in Canada, New Zealand, and the United Kingdom. They were introduced to solve the issue of milk payments occasionally being stolen (including by the children of the household), as they would be left outside the house, usually inside the empty bottles that were waiting to be refilled. Milk tokens often marked what products they were valid for, removing the need to write orders down. They also removed the issue of people not having enough change.

== Canada ==
The first dairy tokens in Canada were created in the 1890s. These early tokens were often made with either copper, aluminium or brass, but anodised aluminium became the most common metal because of its light weight and its avoidance of being tarnished. Colour was rarely used in milk tokens in Canada before the Second World War. After new plastics were designed, western Canadian dairy companies began using opaque coloured plastic tokens in the 1940s, but plastic was rarely used in eastern Canada. Dairy tokens in Canada used imperial units until the country's metrication in the late 1970s.

Tokens in Canada came in various shapes, commonly round, rectangular, triangular or scalloped (wavy). Some more specific shapes included hearts, bull's heads and "T" shapes. Milk tokens also often had perforated holes so that they could be held on strings in kitchens. They also came in various colours, with some tokens being colour-coded so that the milkman could understand what type or quantity of milk was being ordered from a distance. Some milk tokens were designed so that they would sit inside the neck of the empty bottles and not at the bottom; cash left at the bottom of bottles would sometimes get stuck if any leftover milk froze in cold weather.

== New Zealand ==
According to the Otago Daily Times, milk tokens were first used in Wellington in 1922 and stopped being used in about the 1980s after the milk industry was deregulated.

== United Kingdom ==
In the United Kingdom, when the price of milk increased, the colour of the tokens would be changed. If customers had an old token colour, they would leave an extra coin outside their house to pay the difference.

== See also ==
- Telephone token
