= Penny (New Zealand coin) =

New Zealand coin

One penny
- New Zealand
- Value: 1d (£NZ)
- Mass: 9.45 g
- Diameter: 31.75 mm
- Edge: Plain
- Composition: 95.5% copper, 1.5% zinc, 3% tin (1940 - 1959); 97% copper, 2.5% zinc, 0.5% tin (1960 - 1965)
- Years of minting: 1940-1965

Obverse
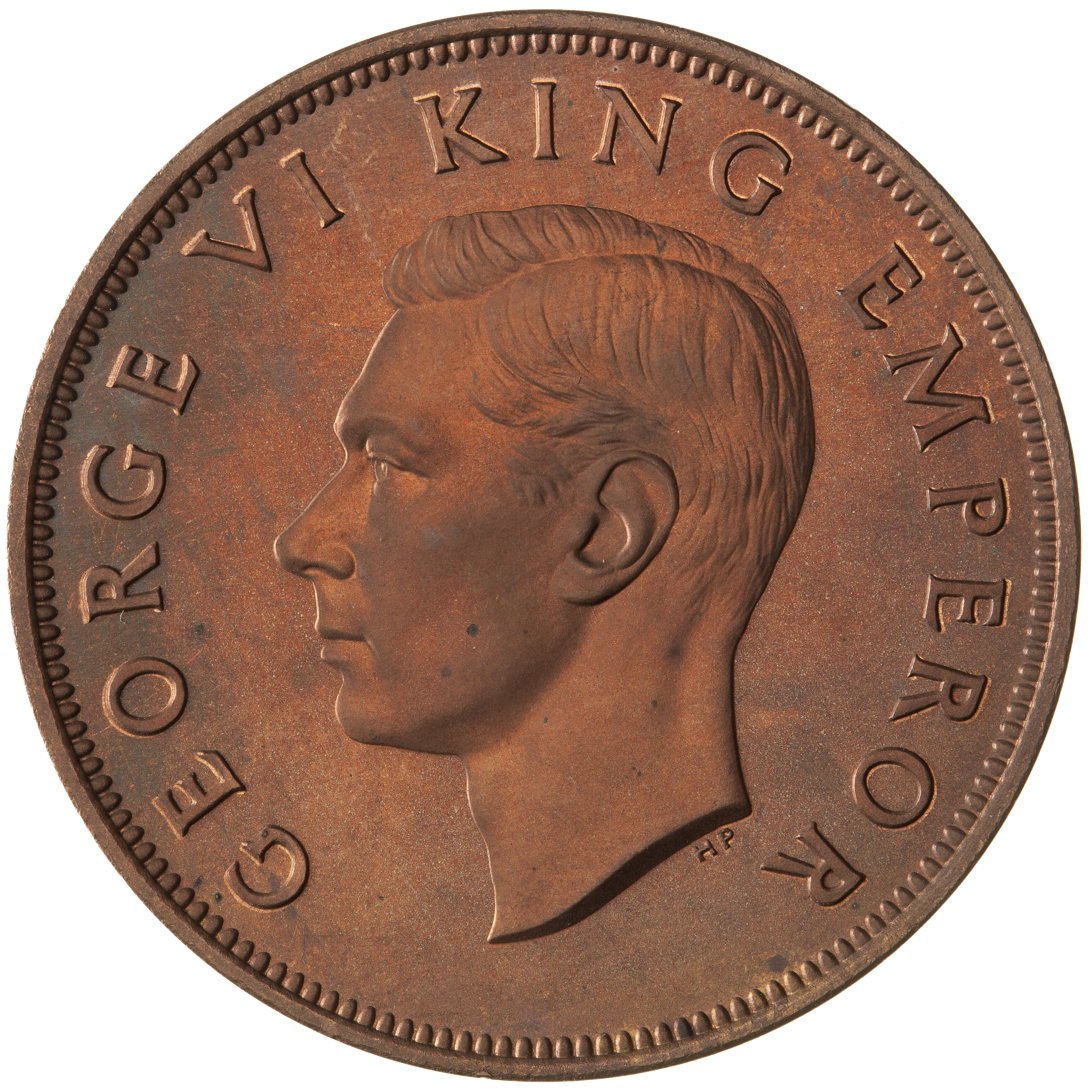
- Design: Uncrowned bust of George VI
- Designer: Humphrey Paget

Reverse
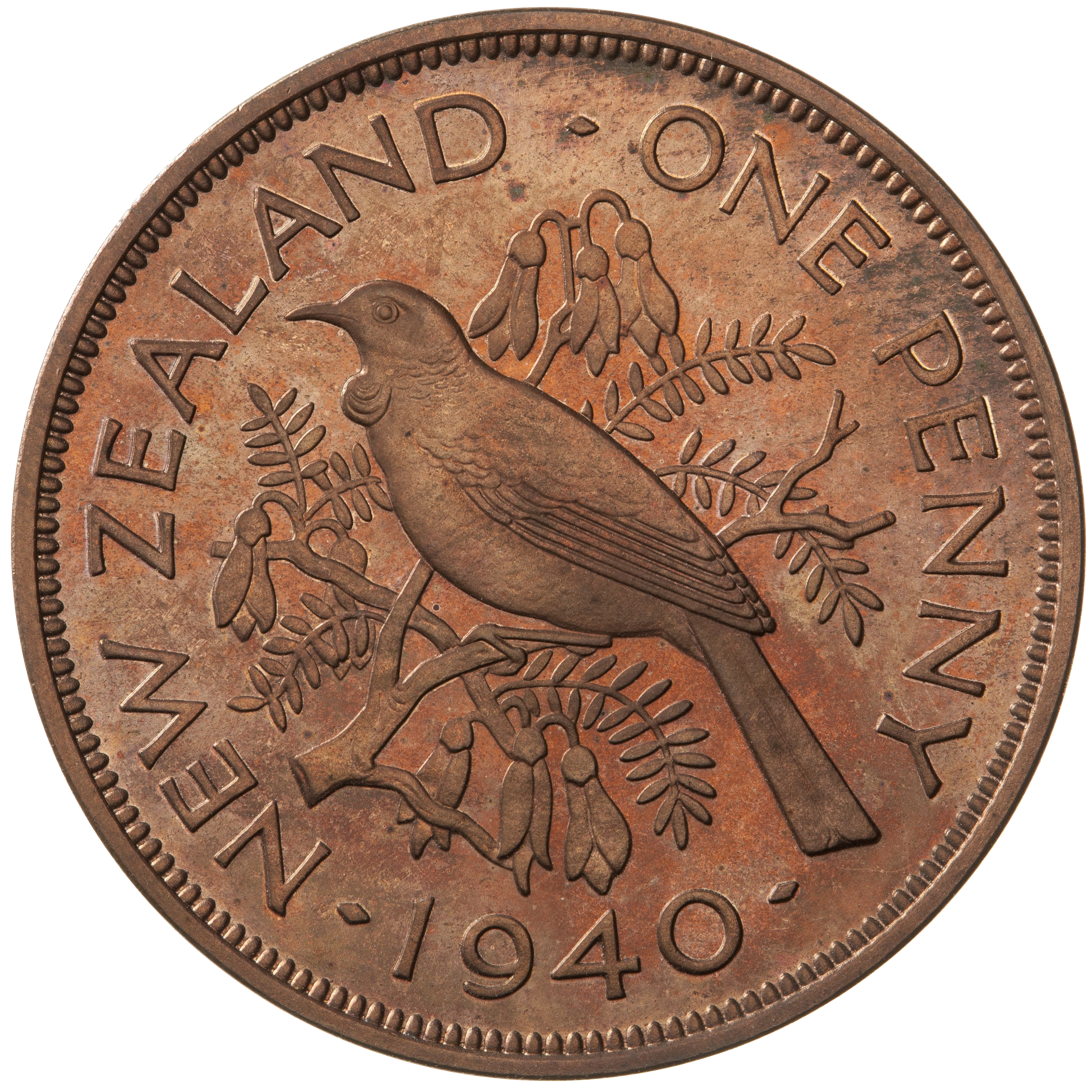
- Design: A tūī surrounded by kōwhai blossoms
- Designer: Leonard C. Mitchell

The New Zealand penny is a large bronze coin issued from 1939 (Note: Although dated 1940, the first issue of pennies were minted prior to this and began circulating in late 1939.) to 1965. Introduced seven years after the larger denominations of New Zealand pound coinage, the coin's issuing was scheduled to align with the centennial of the Treaty of Waitangi and the New Zealand centennial, alongside the halfpenny and centennial half-crown. Featuring the standard portrait of the ruling monarch on the obverse, the reverse features a tūī bird perched atop a kōwhai branch.

The coin was designed in a government-sponsored design competition. British sculptors George Kruger Gray and Percy Metcalfe, designers of previous New Zealand coinage, submitted designs, but the contest was won by New Zealand sculptor Leonard Cornwall Mitchell. Metcalfe altered Mitchell's submitted sketches into a model, and the coin entered production in late 1939. Following the decimalisation of New Zealand currency in 1967, the coin was demonetised and replaced with a smaller one-cent coin. Although there were some calls to retain the tūī design on the new penny, it was ultimately abandoned following decimalisation alongside all other pound coinage designs.

== Background ==
While the pound sterling had been the legal tender in New Zealand since 1858, various one and half-penny copper tokens minted by local tradesmen circulated during the mid-19th century in the New Zealand colony due to a lack of British imperial coinage. The first known penny tokens began mintage in 1857, and by their cessation in 1881 formed about half of the copper coinage circulating in the colony. They were officially demonetised in 1897, as supply of British pennies and halfpennies became reliable.

The sudden influx of large amounts of Australian coinage into New Zealand in the early 1930s, coupled with rampant currency smuggling in response to the devaluation of the New Zealand pound relative to the pound sterling, prompted the creation of a distinct national coinage. Silver coinage began circulating in 1933, but no immediate need was seen for the design or introduction of domestic pennies and halfpennies, as British copper coins were still in circulation as legal tender.

== Design and introduction ==
In 1936 the New Zealand Numismatic Society, which often served as an advisory body to the national government on coinage issues, began to press for the introduction of bronze coinage by 1940 to correspond with the hundredth anniversary of the Treaty of Waitangi. At an October 1937 meeting of the government-appointed National Historical Committee, Under-Secretary of Internal Affairs Joe Heenan formally proposed the issue of bronze denominations in 1940, alongside a commemorative medal and half-crown. In June 1938, a committee headed by Assistant Secretary Athol MacKay and joined by various members of the National Historical Committee was formed to facilitate the approval of submitted designs for the new coinage. For the design of the penny and halfpenny, a modest prize of £25 each was offered. Just over a month was allowed to submit designs.

=== Design proposals ===
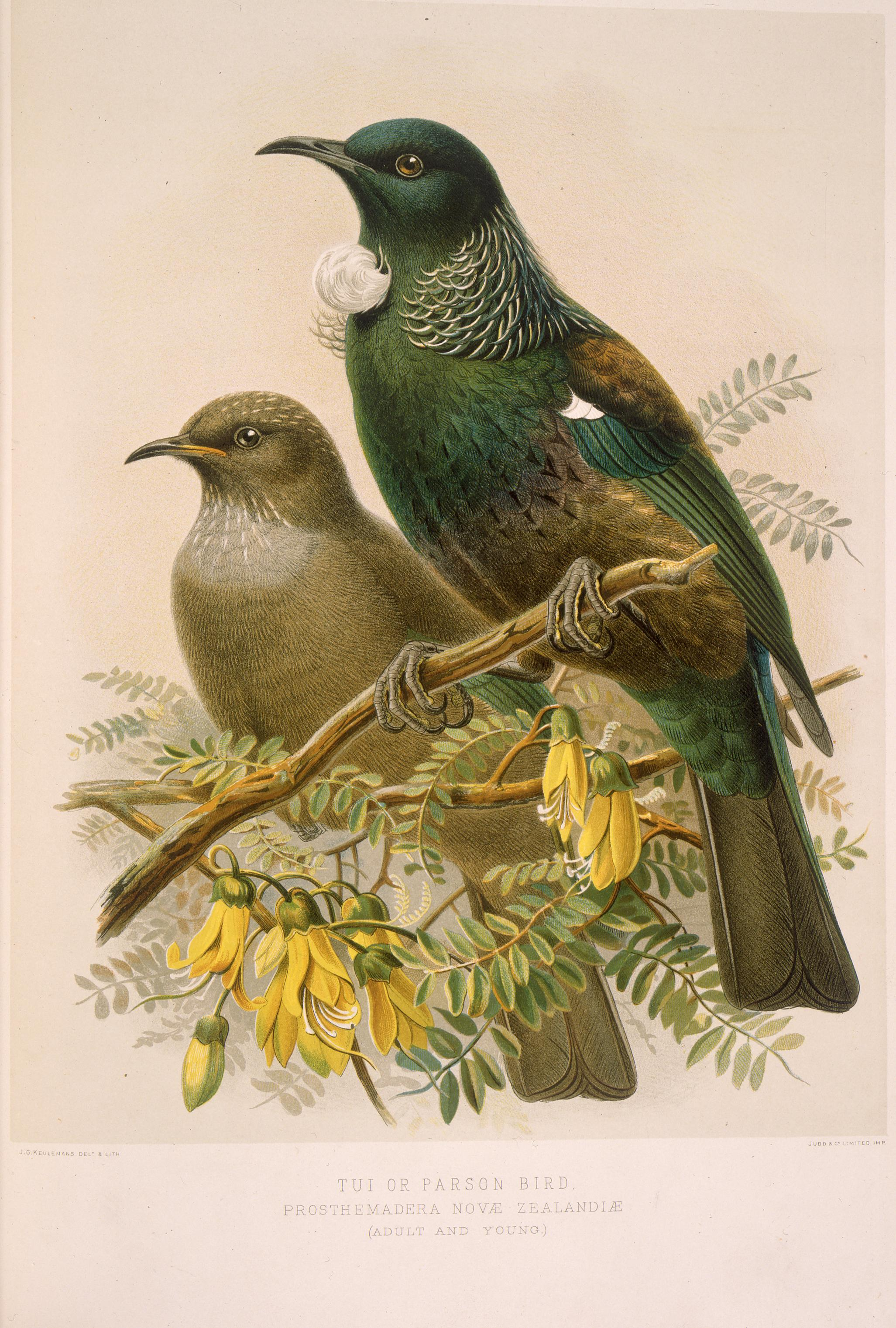
Tūī perched on a kōwhai branch as depicted by J.G. Keulemans in History of the Birds of New Zealand, possibly used as a reference for Mitchell's design

Kruger Gray and Percy Metcalfe, Royal Mint employees who had designed previous New Zealand coinage, were the only artists outside the country to submit designs. Metcalfe's resubmitted a "baffling" design previously rejected for the shilling, a toki poutangata (a greenstone Māori adze) superimposed with a whakapakoko rākau or godstick, a ceremonial staff used by Māori priests. Gray's penny design featured the prow of waka taua, a Māori war canoe. A local art instructor, Thomas Jenkin, also featured a waka taua on his penny proposal, depicting it alongside a silver fern at seashore with several warriors aboard.

Francis Shurrock, a local sculptor and art teacher, submitted multiple designs. One penny design showed a Māori tekoteko figurine (Note: Later reused in 1949 for the Margaret Condliffe Memorial Award, and again in 1965 as a proposed 10-cent piece.), with the other featuring a fern and a triumphant rugby player holding a ball. A modified version of this design would be submitted in 1966, to public outcry, as a proposed 20 cent piece. James Berry, who had previously worked alongside Metcalfe on the reverse of the Waitangi crown, proposed a full suite of coinage including a one-penny piece featuring the HMS Endeavour, the ship commanded by Captain Cook in his mid-18th century expeditions to New Zealand.

Leonard C. Mitchell's design, featuring a tūī songbird perched atop a blossoming kōwhai branch, was ultimately selected by the committee, continuing a motif of native birds on New Zealand coinage, alongside the kiwi on the florin and huia on the sixpence. His original design was remarkably similar to a depiction of two tūī by John Keulemans, which may have directly or indirectly served as a base for the design. Mitchell's original large-scale model was highly illustrative, with the designer noting on the back of a submitted photograph "Have kept detail down as much as possible but if necessary further elimination could be made." William Perry, Chief Clerk of the Royal Mint, criticised the design, noting that its design would not transfer to that of a physical coin. The Royal Mint Advisory Committee recommended that the feathers be rendered in greater relief.

With Mitchell's design approved, Percy Metcalfe was tasked by the Royal Mint with creating a plaster model for the coin. Unlike his rendering of the halfpenny, he made significant changes to the achievement of the coin, increasing the depth of the feathers while simplifying the kōwhai foiliage. High Commissioner Bill Jordan approved the design in June 1939, and the coin entered production.

== Mintage and production ==
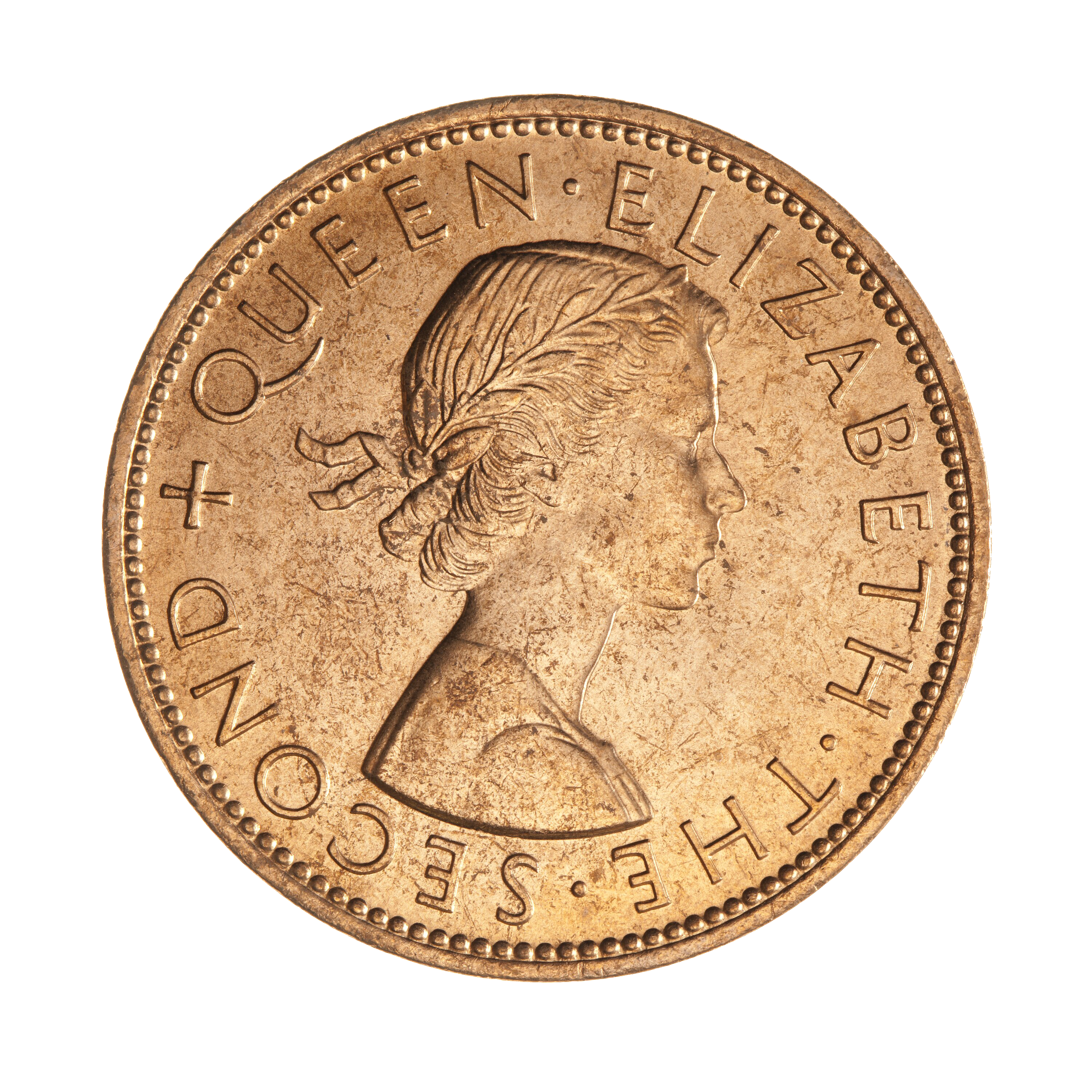
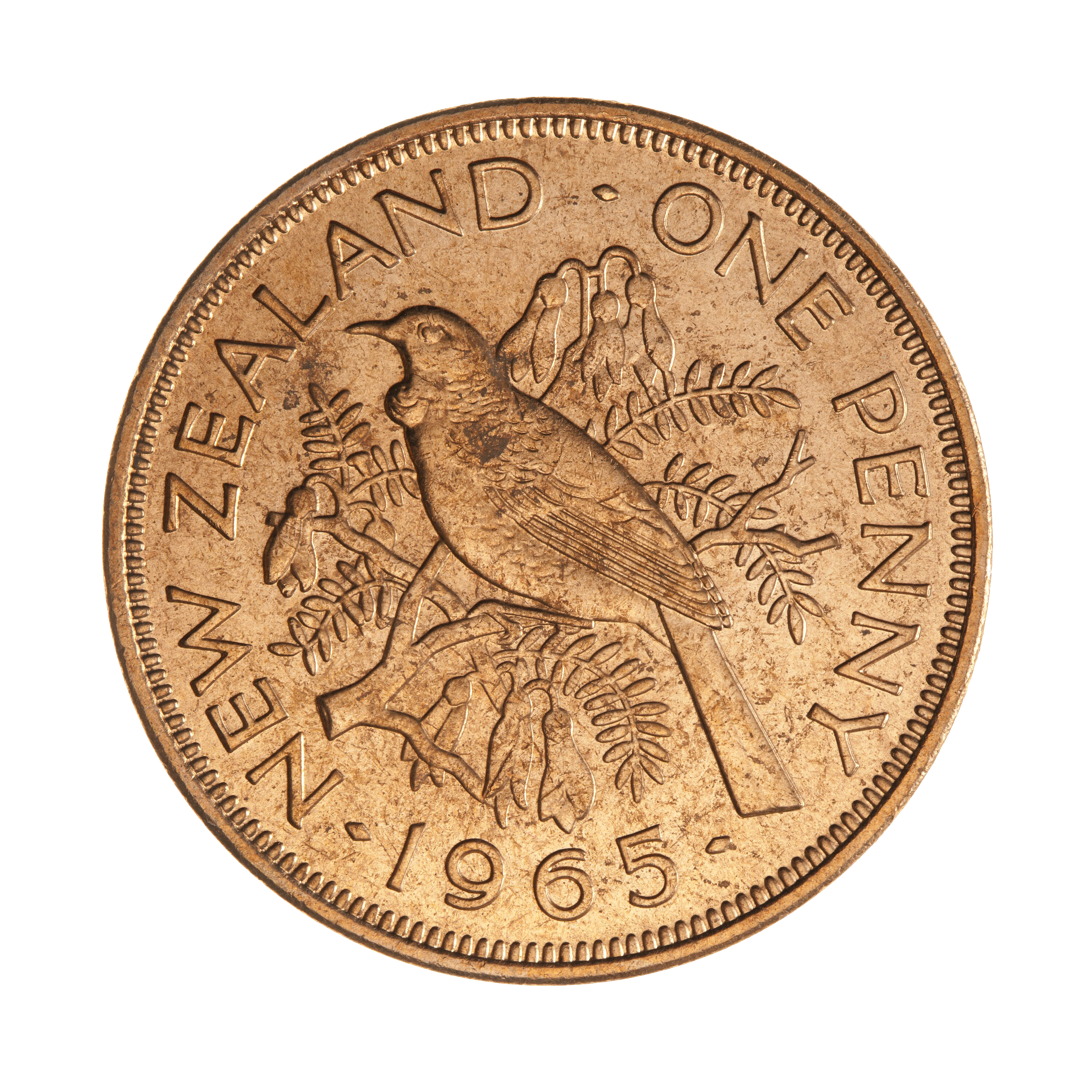
A 1965 penny, the final issue prior to decimalisation, featuring Elizabeth II

Although initially planned to be released alongside the Waitangi centennial in February 1940, the first pennies entered circulation in December 1939 due to an emerging shortage of British pennies in New Zealand. 31.75 mm in diameter and 9.45 g in weight, the coins were initially made of an alloy consisting of 95.5% copper, 1.5% zinc, and 3% tin. The alloy composition of the coin was changed in 1960 to include significantly less tin. Proof pennies were included in a proof set issued to commemorate the coronation of Queen Elizabeth II, with a mintage of 7,000 pieces. In anticipation of the decimalisation in 1967, there were some calls to retain the popular tūī design on the new one-cent piece. However, this was dismissed due to government support for an entirely new set of coinage.

George VI Penny Mintage
Date	1940	1941	1942	1943	1944	1945	1946	1947	1948	1949	1950	1951	1952
Mintage	5,424,000	1,200,000	3,120,000	8,400,000	3,696,000	4,764,000	6,720,000	5,880,000	0	2,016,000	5,784,000	6,880,000	10,800,000

Elizabeth II Penny Mintage
Date	1953	1954	1955	1956	1957	1958	1959	1960	1961	1962	1963	1964	1965
Mintage	2,400,000	1,080,000	3,720,000	3,600,000	2,400,000	10,800,000	8,400,000	7,200,000	7,200,000	6,000,000	2,400,000	18,000,000	200,000
