= New Zealand pound =

Currency of New Zealand from 1840 until 1967

New Zealand one pound note
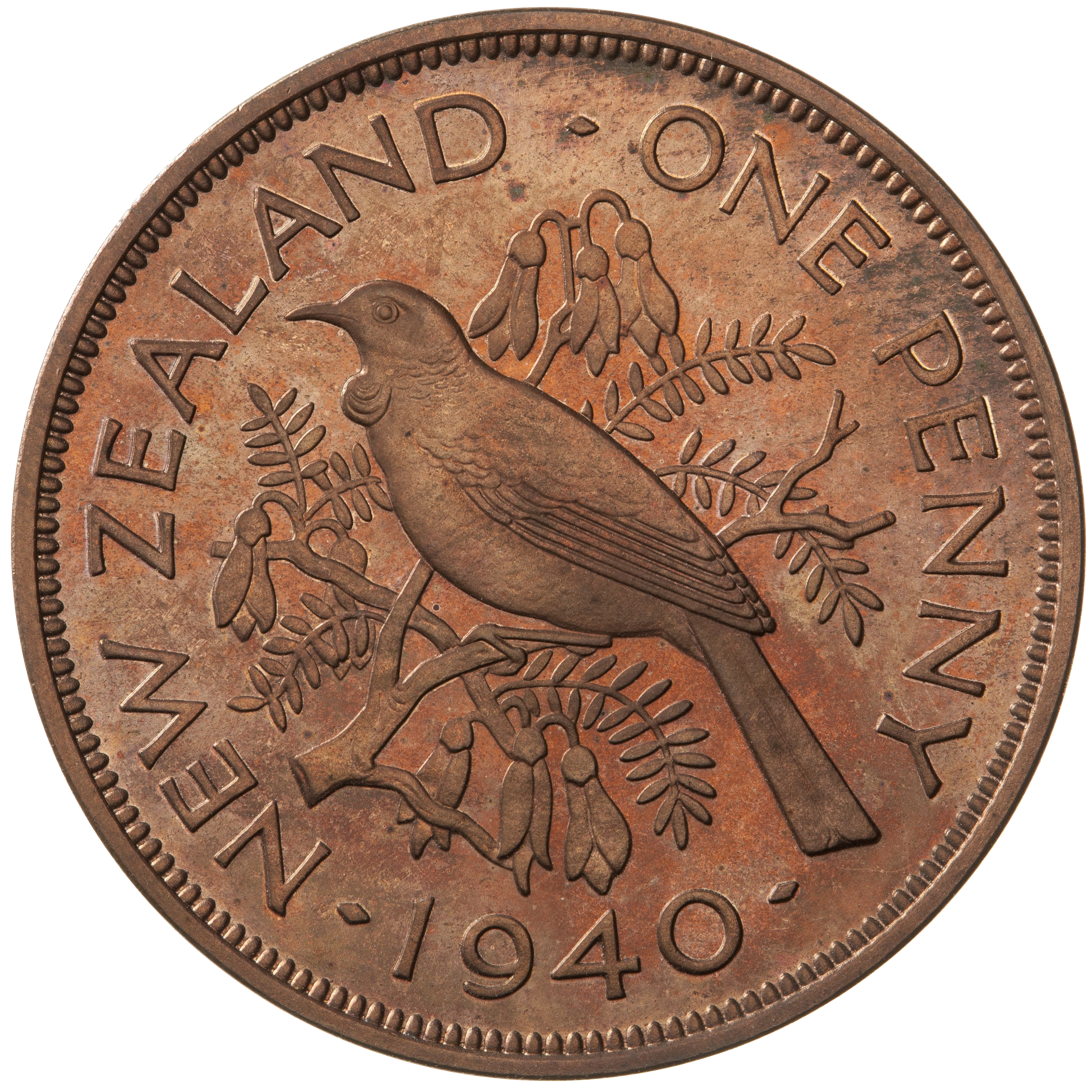
New Zealand one penny coin

Unit
- Symbol: £

Denominations
- Subunit
- 1/20: shilling
- 1/240: penny
- Symbol
- shilling: s or /
- penny: d
- Banknotes: 10/–, £1, £5, £10, £50
- Coins: 1/2d, 1d, 3d, 6d, 1/–, 2/–, 2/6

Demographics
- Date of introduction: 1840
- Date of withdrawal: 1967
- Replaced by: New Zealand dollar
- User(s): New Zealand, Cook Islands, Niue, Pitcairn Islands, Tokelau

Issuance
- Central bank: Reserve Bank of New Zealand
- Website: www.rbnz.govt.nz
- This infobox shows the latest status before this currency was rendered obsolete.

The pound (symbol £, £N.Z. for distinction) was the currency of New Zealand from 1933 until 1967, when it was replaced by the New Zealand dollar. Prior to this, New Zealand used the pound sterling since the Treaty of Waitangi in 1840. Like the pound sterling, it was subdivided into 20 shillings (abbreviation s or /) each of 12 pence (symbol d).

== History ==
Up until the outbreak of the First World War, the New Zealand pound was at parity with one pound sterling.

As a result of the Great Depression of the early 1930s, the New Zealand agricultural export market to the UK was badly affected. Australian banks, which controlled the New Zealand exchanges with London, devalued the New Zealand pound to match the value of the Australian pound in 1933, from parity or £NZ 1 = £1 sterling to £NZ 1 = 16s sterling (£0.8). In 1948, it returned to parity with sterling or £NZ 1 = £1 sterling.

In 1967, New Zealand decimalised its currency, replacing the pound with the dollar at a rate of $NZ 2 = £NZ 1 (or $NZ 1 = 10/– NZ). In November of that year, the British government devalued sterling from £1 sterling = US$2.80 to US$2.40, but the New Zealand dollar was devalued even more from $NZ 1 = US$1.40 to US$1.12 in order to match the value of the Australian dollar.

== Coins ==
Initially, British and Australian coins circulated in New Zealand. The devaluation of the New Zealand pound relative to sterling in the 1930s led to the issue of distinct New Zealand coins in 1933, in denominations of 3d, 6d, 1/– (one shilling), 2/– (or florin) and 2/6 (half-crown), minted in 50% silver until 1946 and in copper-nickel from 1947. In 1940, bronze 1/2d and 1d coins were introduced. All these denominations were the same size and weight as their equivalents in the Australian and UK coinage (although Australia never minted a half-crown). When the UK introduced the nickel-brass twelve sided threepenny bit, New Zealand continued to use the smaller silver coin until decimalisation in 1967.

Reverse Image	Value	Equivalent in cents (c)	Technical Parameters				Description			Date of	
	Value	Equivalent in cents (c)	Diameter	Thickness	Mass	Composition	Edge	Obverse	Reverse	Issue	Withdrawal
	1/2d (half penny)	0.4167c	26 mm		5.7 g	Bronze	Plain	King George VI (1940–52); Queen Elizabeth II (1953–67)	A Māori hei-tiki (neck pendant) with ornamental tukutuku patterns on each side	1940	
	1d (one penny)	0.8333c	31 mm		9.5 g	Bronze	Plain	King George VI (1940–52); Queen Elizabeth II (1953–67)	A tūī perched in a setting of yellow kōwhai blossoms	1940	
	3d (three pence)	2.5c	16 mm		1.4 g	50% silver (1933–1946); Cupronickel (1947–1967)	Plain	King George V (1933–1936); King George VI (1937–1952); Queen Elizabeth II (1953–1967)	Two carved patu (Māori weapons) crossed with lanyards or thongs attached, with "3d" between their blades	1933	
	6d (six pence)	5c	19 mm		2.9 g	50% silver (1933–1946); Cupronickel (1947–1967)	Continuously milled	King George V (1933–1936); King George VI (1937–1952); Queen Elizabeth II (1953–1967)	A huia perched on a branch	1933	31 October 2006^{1}
	1/– (one shilling)	10c	23 mm		5.7 g	50% silver (1933–1946); Cupronickel (1947–1967)	Continuously milled	King George V (1933–1936); King George VI (1937–1952); Queen Elizabeth II (1953–1967)	A figure of a Māori warrior in warlike attitude carrying a taiaha	1933	31 October 2006^{1}
	2/– (2 shillings, one florin)	20c	28.5 mm		11.3 g	50% silver (1933–1946); Cupronickel (1947–1967)	Continuously milled	King George V (1933–1936); King George VI (1937–1952); Queen Elizabeth II (1953–1967)	A kiwi facing left	1933	31 October 2006^{1}
	2/6 (2 1/2 shillings, 2 shillings and 6 pence, half crown)	25c	32 mm		14.1 g	50% silver (1933–1946); Cupronickel (1947–1967)	Continuously milled	King George V (1933–1936); King George VI (1937–1952); Queen Elizabeth II (1953–1967)	Arms of New Zealand on a background of Māori carvings.	1933	
	5/– (crown, five shillings)	50c	38.8 mm		28.3 g	50% silver (1935, 1949); Cupronickel (1953)	Continuously milled	King George V (1933–1936); King George VI (1937–1952); Queen Elizabeth II (1953–1967)	Commemorative only^{2}		
These images are to scale at 2.5 pixels per millimetre. For table standards, see the coin specification table. Notes: 1. The sixpence, shilling, and florin (2 shilling), although rarely seen in circulation, remained legal tender as late as 2006, being used as the identical size and value of its decimal successors: the 5c (cents), 10c, and 20c coins respectively. They were demonetised on 31 October 2006, when the 5c coin and the original 10c and 20c coins were withdrawn from circulation.; 2. Three commemorative crowns were issued in 1935, 1949, and 1953. Example Coronation crown shown; see: New Zealand crown

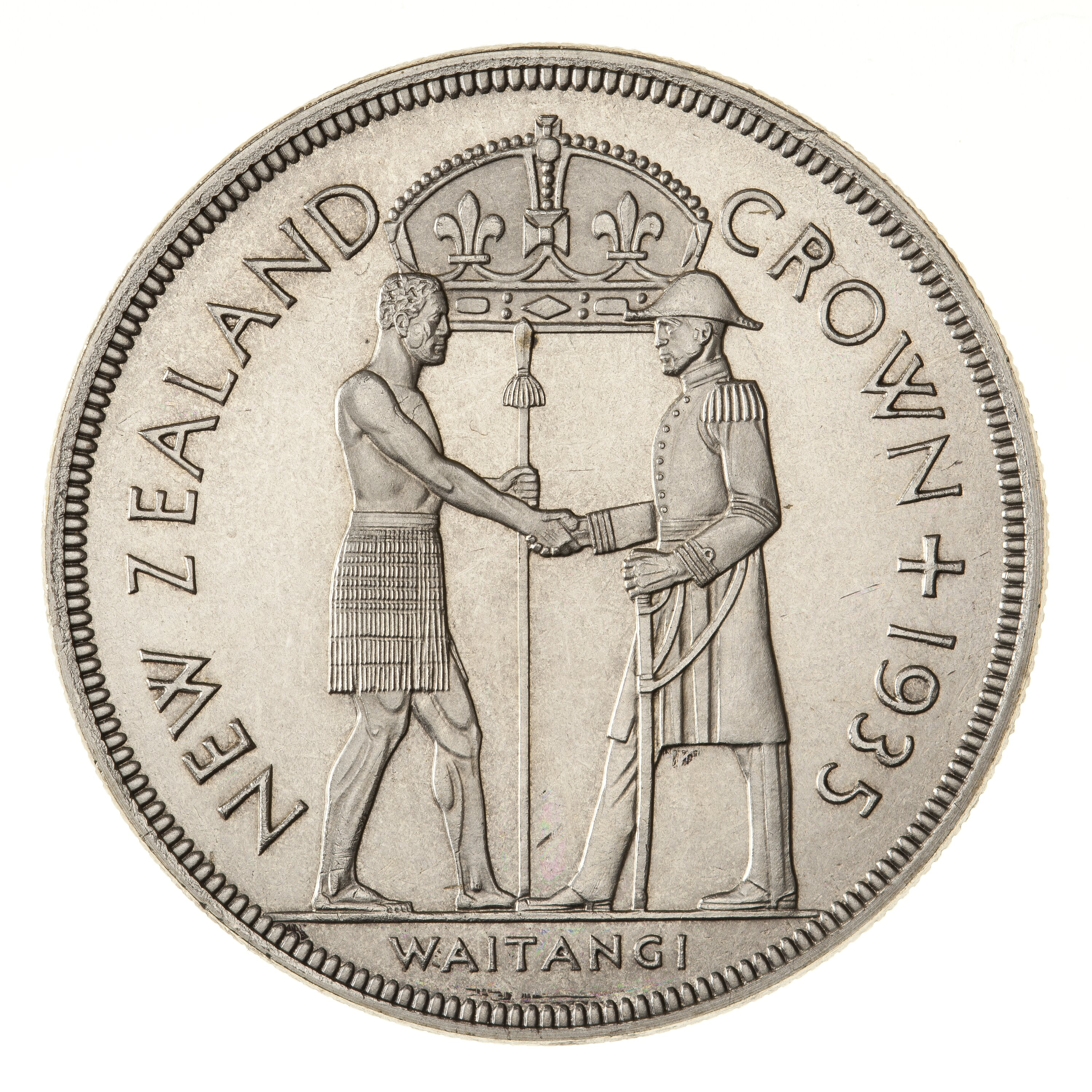
The 1935 Waitangi crown, the first commemorative coin of New Zealand

Three commemorative crowns were minted: the Waitangi crown in 1935, a crown to commemorate a proposed royal visit in 1940, and a crown to commemorate the coronation of Queen Elizabeth II.

== Banknotes ==
Until 1934, private trading banks issued notes. The first bank notes were issued in New Zealand in March 1840 by the Union Bank of Australia at Britannia, now Wellington, then the New Zealand Banking Company followed in September 1840 at Kororareka, now Russell. These banks issued notes in New Zealand:

- Union Bank of Australia (March 1840 – July 1934)
- New Zealand Banking Company (September 1840 – January 1845)
- Colonial Bank of Issue (1847–1856)
- Otago Banking Company (unsuccessful issuer in 1851)
- Oriental Bank Corporation (1857 – May 1861)
- Bank of New South Wales (May 1861 – July 1934)
- Bank of New Zealand (October 1861 – July 1934)
- Commercial Bank of New Zealand (1863–1866)
- Bank of Australasia (1863 – July 1934)
- Bank of Auckland (December 1864 – June 1867)
- Bank of Otago (1864–1874)
- Colonial Bank of New Zealand (1873 – November 1895)
- National Bank of New Zealand (1874 – July 1934)
- Bank of Aotearoa (unsuccessful issuer c. 1886)
- Commercial Bank of Australia (1912 – July 1934)

Between 1852 and 1856, the Colonial Bank of Issue was the only banknote issuing body. Public distrust of these notes soon led to their redemption with Union Bank notes. The discovery of gold in 1861 encouraged competing banks into New Zealand leading to a variety of note issue. By 1924, public demand for convenience in usage led to the six remaining issuing banks agreeing a "Uniform" standard size and colour for each denomination.

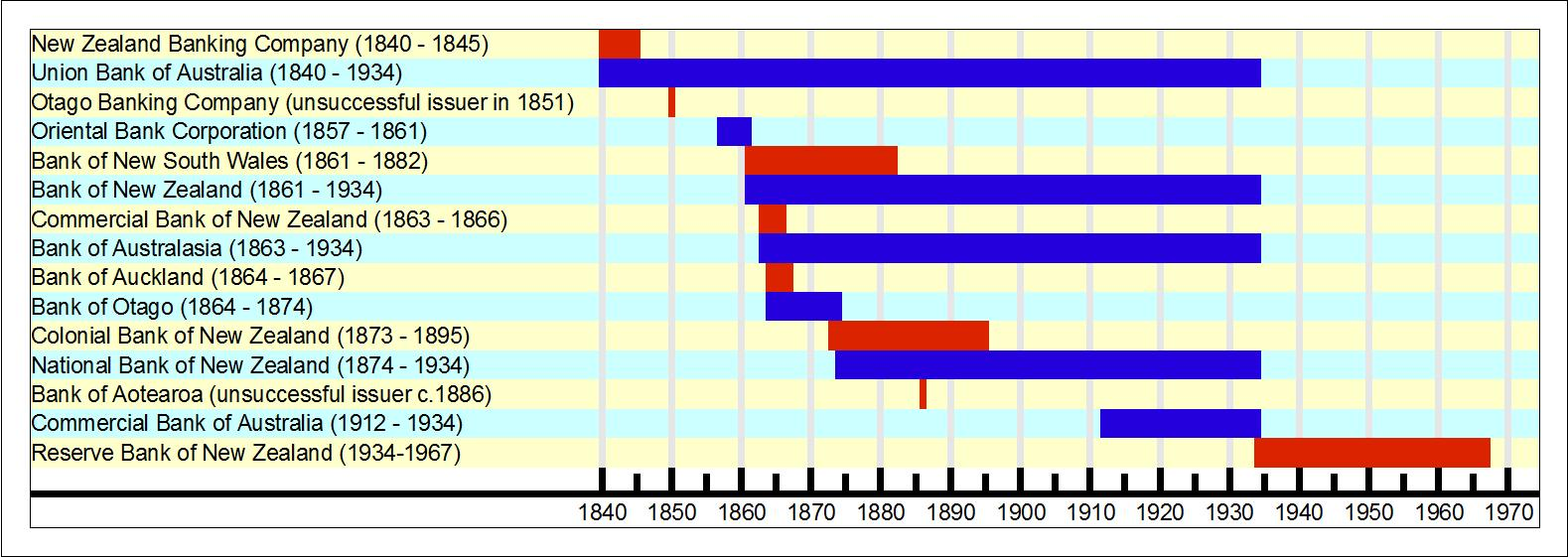
The private trading banks that issued the NZ pound between 1840 and 1934, and the Reserve Bank until 1967.

When the Reserve Bank of New Zealand was established on 1 August 1934 by the Reserve Bank of New Zealand Act 1933, it became the sole issuer of notes. This government agency introduced notes for 10/–, £1, £5 and £50. In 1940, £10 notes were added. Only two series of £1 notes were printed. The first (1934–40) featured the portrait of Matutaera Te Pukepuke Te Paue Te Karato Te-a-Pōtatau Tāwhiao, the second (1940–67) featured Captain James Cook.

The last circulating second series banknotes of the New Zealand pound, at the time of decimalisation in 1967, are described in the following table.

Image		Value	Dimensions	Main Colour	Description			Date of issue
Obverse	Reverse	Value	Dimensions	Main Colour	Obverse	Reverse	Watermark	Date of issue
		10/- (ten shillings)	7 × 3½ in (178 × 89 mm)	Brown	Captain James Cook, Coat of arms of New Zealand	Kiwi, Signing of the Treaty of Waitangi	Kīngi Tāwhiao	1940
		£1	7 × 3½ in (178 × 89 mm)	Purple	Captain James Cook, Coat of arms of New Zealand	HMS Endeavour at sea	Kīngi Tāwhiao	1940
		£5	7 × 3½ in (178 × 89 mm)	Blue	Captain James Cook, Coat of arms of New Zealand	Fantail, Lake Pukaki and Aoraki / Mount Cook	Kīngi Tāwhiao	1940
		£10	7 × 3½ in (178 × 89 mm)	Green	Captain James Cook, Crowned escutcheon, sailing ship	Ponga, scene with sheep and tī kōuka (cabbage tree)	Kīngi Tāwhiao	1940
		£50	7 × 3½ in (178 × 89 mm)	Red	Captain James Cook, Crowned escutcheon, sailing ship	Tūī, dairy farm scene and Mount Taranaki	Kīngi Tāwhiao	1940
These images are to scale at 0.7 pixel per millimetre (18 pixel per inch). For table standards, see the banknote specification table.

== Present status ==
Coins and uncancelled notes issued by the six private trading banks operating in 1934 as well as the Reserve Bank of New Zealand are still redeemable at the RBNZ offices in Wellington. The RBNZ has an obligation to redeem private bank notes. Under the 1933 Reserve Bank Act the privately held gold was confiscated and paid for in RBNZ banknotes.

In all cases, the currency's value to collectors is now far higher than its face value, due to its rarity. A prime example is a first issue Union Bank £1 from the 1840s returned to New Zealand in 1934, for redemption at face value, by its owner in the United States. Today a similar note would be valued in excess of £10,000 sterling. £NZ.50 notes of the Reserve Bank are also extremely rare and fetch a high price from collectors. The note signed by Chief Cashier T. P. Hanna in uncirculated condition could fetch as high as $NZ.25,000 according to the premier value listing for New Zealand notes and coins (some other lesser valued notes signed by Hanna exist).

== Notes ==
Preceded by: Pound sterling	Currency of New Zealand; 1933 – 9 July 1967	Succeeded by: New Zealand dollar Reason: decimalisation Ratio: 2 dollars = 1 pound
