= Australian five-cent coin =

Current denomination of Australian currency

Five cents
- Australia
- Value: 0.05 AUD
- Mass: 2.83 g
- Diameter: 19.41 mm
- Thickness: 1.30 mm
- Edge: Reeded
- Composition: 75% Copper, 25% Nickel
- Years of minting: 1966–present
- Catalog number: KM# 80

Obverse
- Design: Queen Elizabeth II (1966–2023); King Charles III (2024–present)
- Designer: Various (1966–2023); Dan Thorne (2024–present)
- Design date: 2024

Reverse
- Design: Echidna
- Designer: Stuart Devlin
- Design date: 1966

The five-cent coin is the lowest-denomination circulating coin of the Australian dollar, worth 1/20 of a dollar. It was introduced on 14 February 1966, replacing the pre-decimal sixpence. It has been the lowest-denomination coin in general circulation since the withdrawal of the one-cent and two-cent coins in 1992.

Due to inflation, the purchasing power of the five-cent coin continues to drop, and as of 2018 represents 0.0027 hours (that is, 9.7 seconds) of the country's minimum wage for workers age 21 or over.

The coin was introduced into circulation on 14 February 1966. In its first year of minting, 30 million were struck at the British Royal Mint (then in London), in addition to 45.4 million at the Royal Australian Mint in Canberra. Since then, with the exception of 1981, the coin has been produced exclusively in Canberra. In 1981, 50.3 million were produced at the Royal Mint's new headquarters in Llantrisant, Wales, and 50 million at the Royal Canadian Mint in Winnipeg, in addition to 62 million in Canberra.

The reverse side depicts an echidna and the obverse side the head of state, Queen Elizabeth II. The only commemorative coin in this denomination was issued in 2016 to commemorate the 50th anniversary of decimal currency.

As of 2023–24, the five-cent coin has the highest mintage of any current coins. The lowest mintage was 8.25 million coins in 1972, and the highest was 306.5 million in 2006. No coins were issued in 1985–86, however, only minted for coin sets.

There has been some debate about removing this coin from circulation as with the New Zealand dollar mainly as stated for its low value and high costs; however, there are still no confirmed plans to remove it. Royal Australian Mint chief executive Ross MacDiarmid estimates that, sometime in the second half of the 2020s, "[it] will probably cease to be used due to droppage of demand".

In May 2007, owing to the high market value of copper and nickel, the bullion value of the coin was about 6.5 cents, though there were no reported cases of hoarding or melting down of the coins despite the apparent 30% gross profit to be made from doing so. Market prices in June 2018 were about A$7/kg (equivalent to A$7.86 in 2022) for copper and A$15/kg (equivalent to A$16.85 in 2022) for nickel, making the metal content of the 5c coin worth only 2.5c or 50% of its face value (about the same as for a 10c or 20c coin). The production cost of the coin was 12c in 2022.

5c coins are legal tender for amounts not exceeding $5 for any payment of a debt.

== See also ==
- Coins of the Australian dollar

Preceded by Sixpence (Australian coin)	Five cents (Australian); 1966–present	Succeeded by Present
