= Australian ten-cent coin =

Current denomination of Australian currency

Ten cents
- Australia
- Value: 0.10 AUD
- Mass: 5.65 g
- Diameter: 23.60 mm
- Thickness: 2.00 mm
- Edge: milled
- Composition: 75% Copper, 25% Nickel
- Years of minting: 1966–present
- Catalog number: —

Obverse
- Design: Queen Elizabeth II (1966–2023); King Charles III (2024–present)
- Designer: Various (1966–2023); Dan Thorne (2024–present)
- Design date: 2024

Reverse
- Design: Male superb lyrebird (Menura novaehollandiae)
- Designer: Stuart Devlin
- Design date: 1966

The ten-cent coin is a coin of the Australian dollar, worth 1/10 of a dollar. When the dollar was introduced as half of an Australian pound on 14 February 1966, the coin inherited the specifications of the pre-decimal shilling; both coins were worth one twentieth of a pound and were called "bob". On introduction it was the fourth-lowest denomination coin. Since the withdrawal from circulation of the one and two cent coins in 1992, it has been the second-lowest denomination coin in circulation.

For the first year of minting (1966), 30 million coins were produced at the British Royal Mint (then in London), and 11 million at the Royal Australian Mint in Canberra. Since then, all coins have been produced in Canberra, with the exception of 1981 when 40 million coins from the Royal Mint's new headquarters in Llantrisant, Wales supplemented the 76.1 million produced in Canberra.

Years without issue for the 10c, were 1986, 1987, 1995 and 1996. Those years were only for mint and proof sets. The lowest mintage was in 2011, when 1.7 million coins were issued. There has been one commemorative issue for this denomination, the 50th anniversary of decimal currency in 2016.

The image of a male superb lyrebird (Menura novaehollandiae) is displayed on the reverse of all ten-cent coin. It was designed by Stuart Devlin, who designed the reverses of all of the coins of the Australian dollar introduced in 1966.

The obverse has displayed different designs featuring the head of Elizabeth II, Queen of Australia: from 1966 to 1984, the head by Arnold Machin; from 1985 to 1998, the head by Raphael Maklouf; from 1999 to 2015, and 2017, the head by Ian Rank-Broadley and since 2019, the head by Jody Clark. The obverse of these coins has the inscription AUSTRALIA and the year-of-issue on the right hand side, and ELIZABETH II on the left hand side. In 2016, (the 50th anniversary of decimal currency), the obverse was designed by G. K. Gray.

2016 obverse design to celebrate the 50th anniversary of decimal currency

Year	Subject	Mintage
2016	obverse design to celebrate the 50th anniversary of decimal currency	7,000,000

As of 2022, the production cost of a 10c coin was confirmed as being more than the face-value of the coin by the Royal Australian Mint's CEO.

10c coins are legal tender for amounts not exceeding $5 for any payment of a debt.

Preceded by Shilling (Australian)	Ten cents (Australian); 1966–present	Succeeded by Present
