= Australian two-cent coin =

Former denomination of Australian currency

Two cents
- Australia
- Value: 0.02 AUD
- Mass: 5.20 g
- Diameter: 21.59 mm
- Thickness: 1.4 mm mm
- Edge: Plain
- Composition: 97% copper 2.5% zinc 0.5% tin
- Years of minting: 1966–1991 and 2006–16

Obverse
- Design: Elizabeth II, Queen of Australia
- Designer: Raphael Maklouf
- Design date: 1985

Reverse
- Design: Frill-necked lizard (Chlamydosaurus kingii)
- Designer: Stuart Devlin
- Design date: 1966

The two-cent coin was an Australian coin introduced in 1966. It was the second-lowest denomination until it was withdrawn from circulation in 1992 (along with the one-cent coin). It is still counted as legal tender, but is subject to some restrictions, and two-cent coins are legal tender only up to the sum of 20 cents.

A two-cent coin in 1966 would have a purchasing power equal to about 30c in 2022 values.

== History ==
The coin entered circulation on 14 February 1966. In its first year of minting the coin was manufactured at three different mints: 145.2 million at the Royal Australian Mint in Canberra, 66.6 million at the Melbourne Mint and 217.7 million at the Perth Mint. The only year that the coins were minted outside Australia was 1981, when 70.8 million were struck at the British Royal Mint in Llantrisant, Wales, in addition to 97.4 million from Canberra and 81.8 million from Perth. No two-cent coins were struck in 1986 or 1987 and the last year of minting was 1989.

From 1966 until 1984 the obverse featured the portrait of Queen Elizabeth II by Arnold Machin. It was changed in 1985 to a version by Raphael Maklouf, which remained until its withdrawal from circulation in 1992.

The 2c was only minted for coin sets in the following years: 1986, 1987, 1990, 1991, and finally, 2026.

The decision to remove it was confirmed in the Treasurer's budget speech of 21 August 1990. The removal was due to inflation reducing its value, and the high cost of bronze. Around the same time other countries removed their bronze coins—New Zealand removed its one and two cent coins in 1990, while the United Kingdom and Ireland replaced their bronze one and two pence coins with copper-plated steel coins. After removal from circulation, some of the coins were melted down to make bronze medals for the 2000 Summer Olympics in Sydney, Australia.

== Features ==
The reverse side of the coin features the image of a frill-necked lizard (Chlamydosaurus kingii), a reptile native to northern Australia and southern New Guinea. The image was designed by Stuart Devlin, who designed the reverses of all Australian decimal coins introduced in 1966.

== Sources ==
- Ian W. Pitt, ed. (2000). Renniks Australian Coin and Banknote Values (19th ed.). Chippendale, N.S.W.: Renniks Publications. ISBN 0-9585574-4-6.
- Prospect Stamps and Coins

Preceded by Denomination created	Two cents (Australian); 1966–1991	Succeeded by Withdrawn from circulation
