= Shilling (Australian coin) =

Coin

- Australia
- Value: Pre-decimal: 1/20 Australian pound Decimal: 0.10 Australian dollar
- Mass: 5.65 g
- Diameter: 23.5 mm (0.925 in)
- Edge: Round (milled)
- Composition: 92.5% silver, 7.5% copper (1910–1944). 50% silver, 40% copper, 5% zinc, 5% nickel (1946–1963)
- Circulation: 1910–1963

Obverse
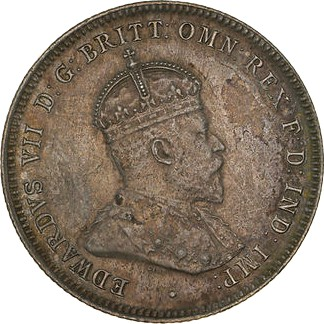
- Design: Visage of King Edward VII
- Designer: George W. De Saules
- Design used: 1910
- Design discontinued: 1911
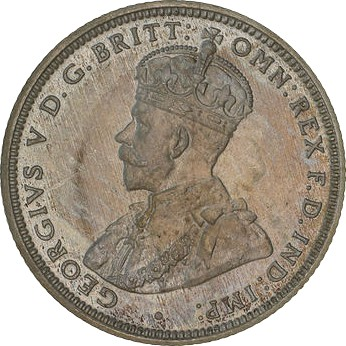
- Design: Visage of King George V
- Designer: Sir Edgar B Mackennal
- Design used: 1911
- Design discontinued: 1936
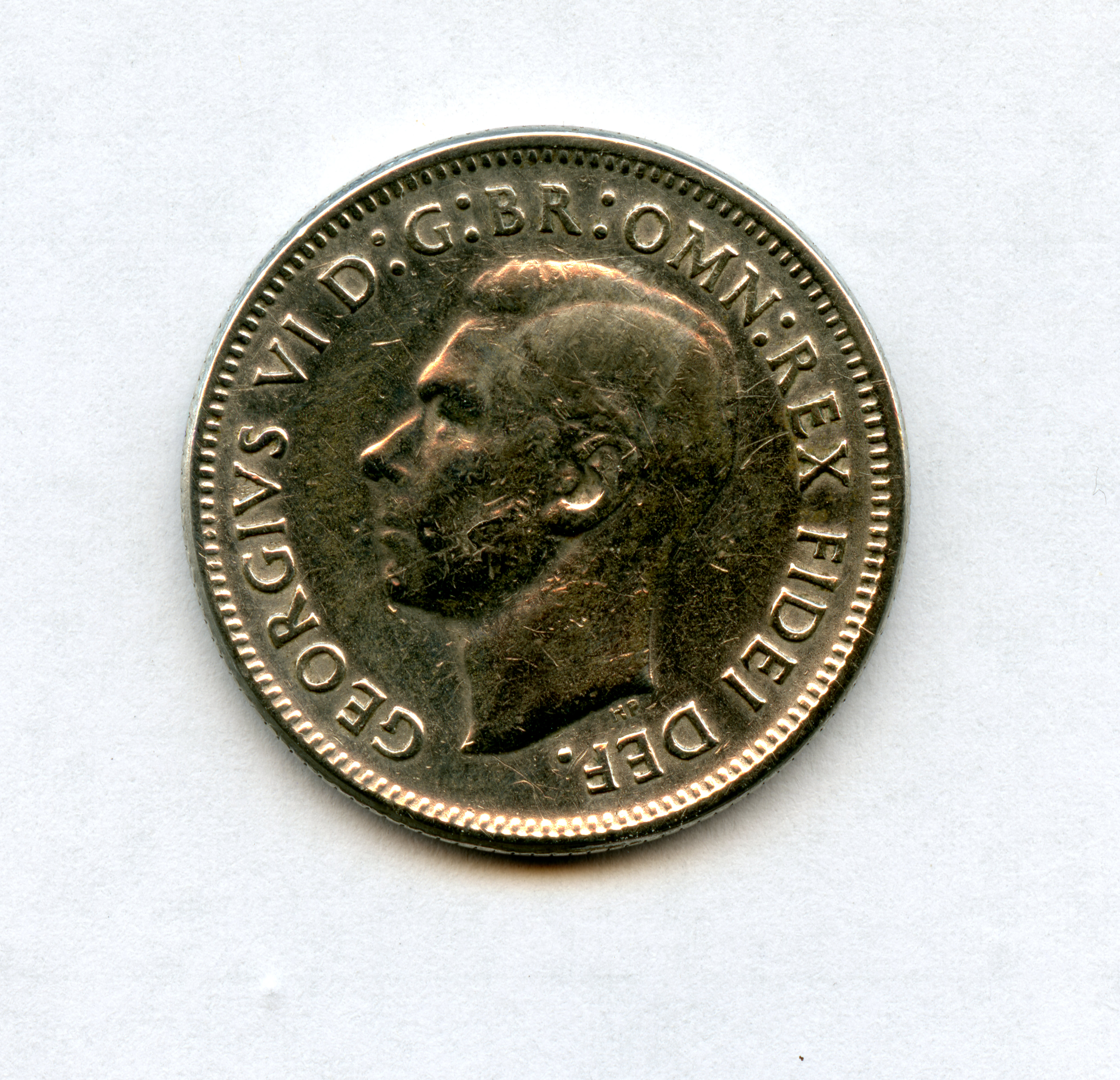
- Design: Visage of King George VI
- Designer: Thomas H. Paget
- Design used: 1938
- Design discontinued: 1952
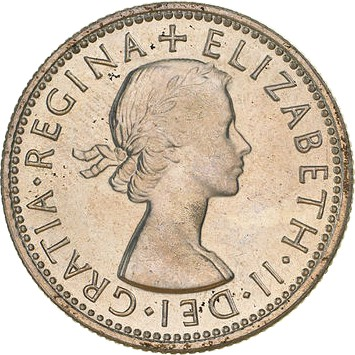
- Design: Visage of Queen Elizabeth II
- Designer: Mary Gillick
- Design used: 1953
- Design discontinued: 1963

Reverse
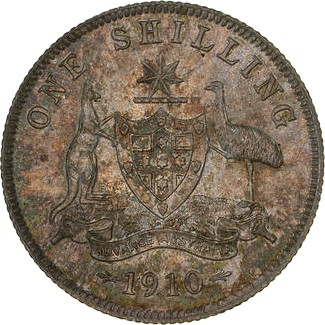
- Design: Australian coat of arms (1908)
- Designer: William Henry James Blakemore
- Design used: 1910
- Design discontinued: 1936
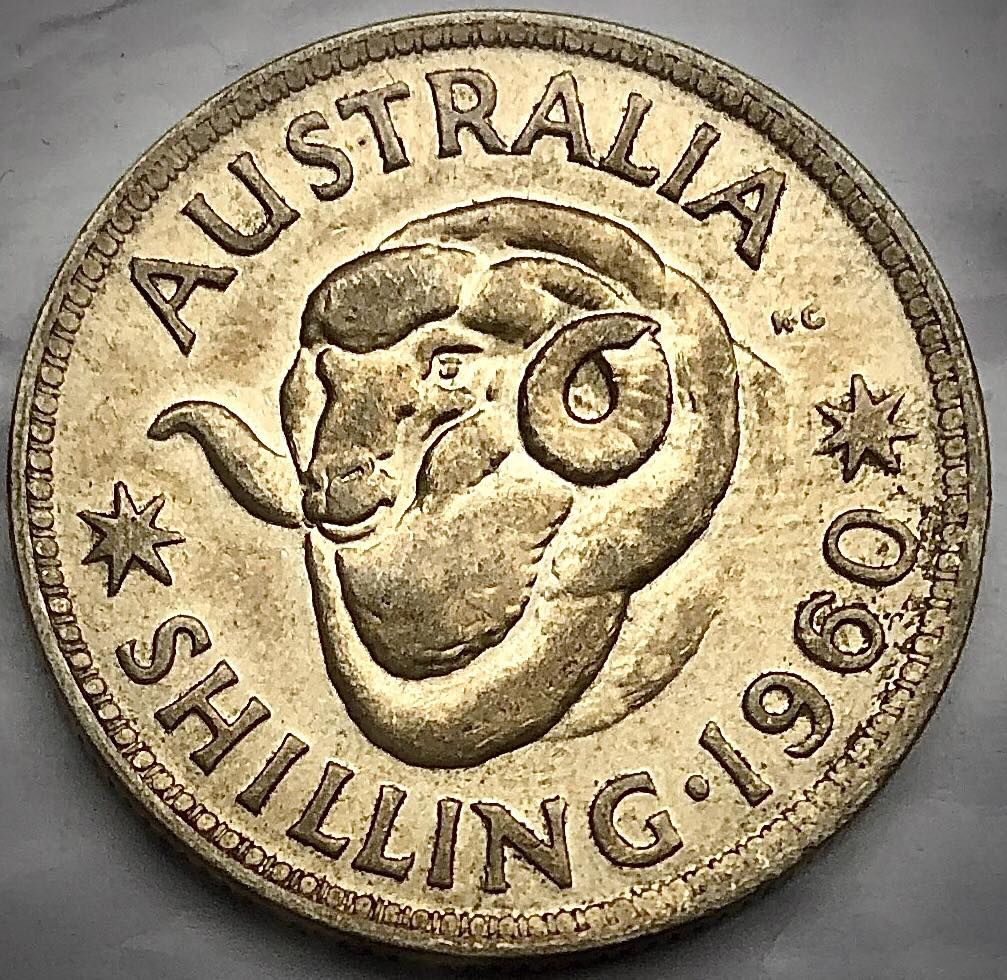
- Design: Merino Ram's head
- Designer: George Kruger Gray
- Design used: 1938
- Design discontinued: 1963

The shilling, informally called a "bob", was a type of silver coinage issued by the Commonwealth of Australia, that circulated prior to the decimalisation of Australian coinage. The Australian shilling was derived from the British pre-decimal sterling pound system (the British shilling) and was first issued following the passing of the Australian Coinage Act 1909, which established Australia's first formal currency system. The shilling was issued as part of Australia's silver coinage, which included the two-shilling (florin), the sixpence and the threepence. The shilling was minted from 1910 until 1963. During this period there was one significant modification to the design of the Australian shilling, the change in its reverse design, which occurred in 1938 when the design was altered from the Australian coat of arms (1910–1936) to the visage of a Merino ram's head (1938–1963).

The design of the Australian shilling was originally meant to mimic the design of the British shilling; however, there were specific design changes that were implemented that created some distinction between the two coins. The mintage of Australian shillings increased after it was first issued, as in the first few years of its production one thousand shillings were produced per annum, whilst towards the end of the shilling's issuance, this amount increased to around ten thousand shillings per annum.

In accordance with the transition towards the decimalisation of Australia's currency, the shilling was no longer issued after 1963 along with other silver coins such as the sixpence, and two-shilling coins. On 14 February 1966 these Australian silver coins (along with the rest of Australia's pre decimal coinage) were slowly phased out over time in accordance with the Currency Act 1965.

== History ==
The Australian shilling was first released in 1910 as part of the implementation of the Coinage Act 1909, along with other silver coins, such as the two-shilling, sixpence, threepence (all were first issued with the head of Edward VII printed on the obverse side of the coin).

=== Pre-decimalisation ===
Before the Federation of Australia in 1901, British shillings were shipped by the British Empire around the world to serve as a universal currency for the Empire. Between 10 February 1825 and 10 June 1836, the British Royal Mint shipped silver coins worth 166,000 pounds to Australia.

However, following the Federation of Australia, the country decided to establish its own currency system. After the Coinage Act 1909 was passed, the first Australian shillings were struck in England, at the Heaton Mint in Birmingham and the Royal Mint in London. In 1916, the first Australian coins to be struck in Australia were silver coins, including shillings which were produced by the Melbourne Mint.

Over the next 50 years, there were minimal changes to Australian silver coinage; however, there were specific design changes that occurred as a result of changes in the English monarchy and periods of war. There were also a number of changes to the design of the coin throughout its period of production between 1910 and 1963. However, in the years 1923, 1929, 1930, 1932, 1937, 1947, 1949 and 1951, Australian shillings were not issued for circulation.

=== Transition to decimalisation ===
In the late 1950s and early 1960s, Australia prepared for the conversion of its currency to the decimal system that would be described as “C-Day” on Monday 14 February 1966. In preparation for “C-Day” the Australian government concluded that no sixpence, one shilling or two-shilling were to be issued after 1963 and from “C-Day” onwards, all Australian pre-decimal coinage would be phased out. After the introduction of Australia's decimal currency on 14 February 1966, the shilling became the equivalent of 10 cents in the new Australian dollar system.

To assist in the transition to decimal currency in Australia, the Federal Government launched an advertising campaign to explain to the Australian community how the transition would be introduced. The majority of these advertisements appeared on television and radio. The advertisements were part of a nationwide education program that aimed to help the Australian public understand the conversion between pre-decimal and decimal currency and the reasons why Australia would be switching to decimal currency. There was a key cartoon character used throughout the television advertisements, named 'Dollar Bill', who educated the other cartoon characters about the new currency system.

== Types ==
There were a number of different types of Australian shilling due to the changes in the obverse and reverse design that occurred between 1909 and 1963. There was also a key change in the alloy makeup of the shilling in 1946.

=== Mintmark ===
Between 1910 and 1915, the obverse design of the shilling bore the mintmarks “H” and “L” as they were issued by either the Ralph Heaton Mint in Birmingham or the Royal Mint in London, respectively. When Australian coins began to be struck at the Melbourne Mint, some shillings bore the Melbourne mintmark under the date. Throughout the period of issue of Australia's pre-decimal coinage, shillings were also struck at the Sydney Mint (bearing the mintmark S), the San Francisco Mint (bearing the mintmark USAS) and the Perth Mint (bearing the mintmark P).

=== Designs ===
==== Reverse design ====
There were two distinct designs for the reverse side of the Australian shilling, the first depicting the 1908 Australian coat of arms (used 1910–1936), designed by William Henry James Blakemore. This was Australia's first design of the coat of arms and was granted by royal warrant from King Edward VII. The coat of arms on the shilling displayed a shield at the centre which was adorned with the cross of St George, while 5 six-pointed stars were dotted along the inside of the cross. Six smaller shields called escutcheons were located around the outer rim of the central shield. Above the shield was the seven-pointed star, symbolising the Federation.

The second design for the reverse side of the Australian shilling depicted the Merino Ram, which was designed by George Kruger Gray. Kruger Gray's initials appeared as KG on each coin containing his design. This design of the Merino Ram was based on the grand champion Merino ram at the 37th Annual Sydney Sheep Show in June 1932. The ram's head and horn placement was considered to be so correct, that it was decided that his visage would be placed on the reverse design of the Australian shilling six years later in 1938. This ram, named Uardry 0.1, was also depicted on the 50-cent coin of 1991.

==== Obverse design ====
The first shillings struck in 1910 bore the visage of King Edward VII on the obverse side of the coin which was designed by George W. De Saules. Between 1911 and 1936 the coins bore the image of King George V on the obverse, which was instead designed by Sir Edgar B Mackennal.

According to the Royal Australian Mint, “in 1936, Edward VIII abdicated and, as a consequence, no British or Australian coins bearing his portrait were released”. However, there are coins that are extremely rare using the reverse intended for Edward VIII's coinage and bearing his image on the obverse that are dated 1937.

When George VI ascended to the throne, the coins struck in his reign (1938–1952) were similar to those designed for the coins of Edward VIII, except for the new reverse design which had been changed to a Merino Ram's head, instead of the previous Australian coat of arms. The visage of the monarch on the obverse design of Australia's pre-decimal coins were required to change direction each time a new monarch ascended to the throne, which was impacted by the abdication of Edward VIII. The Royal Australian Mint describes this as, "By tradition, each new monarch faced a different way on the portrait of his or her coinage" to their predecessor. Thomas Humphrey Paget designed the obverse side of King George VI's coins, whose visage faced the same direction as his father, since the coins of George VI's brother, Edward VIII were meant to face the opposite direction of their father.

After the coronation of Queen Elizabeth II, the first coins struck with her image were issued in 1953, with the same reverse design as the coins issued in the reign of her father, George VI. The obverse design of Queen Elizabeth II's coins were designed by Mary Gillick.

=== Alloy composition ===
The Coinage Act 1909 in accordance with the Commonwealth required that silver coins (including shillings) be made of “standard” silver, which at the time was “defined as a mixture thirty-seven parts of fine silver with three parts of alloy”. Between 1910 and 1938 shillings were composed of 92.5% silver and 7.5% copper. However, after the Second World War, the rising price of silver meant that the silver content of Australian coins was close to meeting the face value of the coin itself and therefore Australia decided to change the silver content of its coins. After 1946 until 1963, shillings were composed of 50% silver, 40% copper, 5% zinc and 5% nickel. In contrast, Australia's current "silver" coins are not made of silver.

Image		Years		Technical parameters				Description / Legend / Designer		
Obverse	Reverse	From	To	Diameter	Thickness	Mass	Composition	Edge	Obverse	Reverse
		1910	1910	23.5 mm		5.65 g	92.5% silver, 7.5% copper	Reeded	Edward VII; EDWARDVS VII D:G: BRITT. OMN: REX F: D: IND: IMP: by George William de Saulles	1908 coat of arms of Australia (with ADVANCE AUSTRALIA on ribbon); ONE SHILLING by W.H.J. Blakemore
		1911	1936						George V GEORGIVS V D.G.BRITT: OMN: REX F.D.IND:IMP: by Bertram Mackennal	
		1938	1944						George VI; GEORGIVS VI D:G:BR:OMN:REX: F:D:IND:IMP. by Thomas Hugh Paget	Merino Sheep / Commonwealth Star; AUSTRALIA SHILLING by George Kruger Gray
		1946	1948				50.0% silver, 40% copper, 5% nickel, 5% zinc			
		1950	1952						George VI; GEORGIVS VI D:G:BR:OMN:REX FIDEI DEF. by Thomas Hugh Paget	
		1953	1954						Elizabeth II + ELIZABETH.II.DEI.GRATIA.REGINA by Mary Gillick	
		1955	1963						Elizabeth II + ELIZABETH.II.DEI.GRATIA.REGINA.F:D: by Mary Gillick	
These images are to scale at 2.5 pixels per millimetre. For table standards, see the coin specification table.

== Relation to the British shilling ==
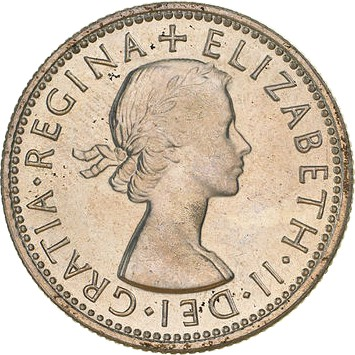

When Australian shillings were introduced, all coins were to be produced the same size and with the same alloy content as their British counterparts, with the obverse originally matching the British coinage which displayed the king without a crown atop his head. However, this obverse design was changed as Edward VII was presented with a crown, whilst the reverse design was distinctly Australian, depicting the Australian coat of arms.

Both British and Australian shillings bore the letters “F:D” representing the phrase Defender of the Faith, which is a title held by the English monarch, who is also the supreme governor of the Church of England. The title was given to the English monarchy in 1521 by Pope Leo X, who granted King Henry VIII the title as a result of his criticism of Martin Luther, the Protestant reformer. However, the title was revoked in 1530 after King Henry broke from the Vatican and founded the Church of England. In 1544, the English Parliament bestowed the title on Henry VIII, which continued to be bestowed upon English monarchs after his reign. There was controversy surrounding the first shillings issued for Queen Elizabeth II in 1953, since these coins did not bear the “F:D” inscription on the obverse design. This decision was met by public outcry especially from church leaders. In 1955 the letters “F:D” were added to the obverse design of shillings and was added to most Australian coin denominations in 1956.

== Production ==
Before the advent of the Australian shilling, Australia's currency was produced by branches of the British Royal Mint in Sydney (opened in 1855), Melbourne (opened in 1872) and Perth (opened in 1899). The Royal Australian Mint never issued Australian shillings or any other form of pre-decimal currency, since it began to produce Australian coinage two years after the ceasing of shilling production and only produced coins in preparation for the transition to decimal currency.

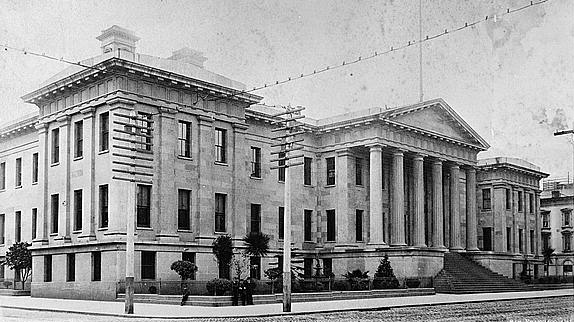
The old San Francisco Mint, built in 1874.

The Australian shilling was produced both in Australia and overseas at different periods. From 1910 to 1915, shillings were struck at the Ralph Heaton Mint in Birmingham and the Royal Mint in London, however shillings began to be produced in Melbourne in 1916. Between 1916 and 1936, the Sydney and Melbourne Mints produced the majority of Australia's shillings. These mints underwent manufacturing shortages during the Second World War, which required Australia to allow the production of specific coinage (primarily silver coinage) at United States (US) mints in San Francisco and Denver. Shillings and florins were produced at the San Francisco Mint, while threepences and sixpences were struck at both the San Francisco and Denver Mint. These coins that were struck in the US mints exhibit mintmarks, "S" and "D" respectively.

== Mintmarks ==
- H : Birmingham
- M : Melbourne
- USAS : San Francisco
- star (above date) : Sydney
- dot (before shilling) : Perth (1946 issue)
- L : Royal Mint (London)

== Mintages ==
Mintages of Australian Shillings from 1910 - 1963 (*000's)
Edward VII	George V	George VI	Elizabeth II
1910 - 2,536	1911 - 1,000	1938 - 1,484	1953 - 12,204
	1912 - 1,000	1939 - 1,520	1954 - 16,188
	1913 - 1,200	1940 - 760	1955 - 7,492
	1914 - 3,300	1941 - 2,500	1956 - 6,064
	1915 - 800 (+500)	1942 - 2,920 (+4000)	1957 - 12,668
	1916 - 5,141	1943 - 1,580	1958 - 8,132
	1917 - 5,274	1944 - 14,576 (+8,000)	1959 - 10,156
	1918 - 3,761	1946 - 10,072 (+1,316)	1960 - 16,408
	1920 - 1,642	1948 - 4,132	1961 - 30,100
	1921 - 522	1950 - 7,188	1962 - 6,592
	1922 - 2,039	1952 - 19,644	1963 - 10,072
	1924 - 673		
	1925 - 1,449		
	1926 - 2,352		
	1927 - 1,416		
	1928 - 664		
	1931 - 1,000		
	1933 - 220		
	1934 - 480		
	1935 - 500		
	1936 - 1,424		

== Citations ==
=== Sources ===
- Bruce, Colin R.; Thomas Michael (2005). 2006 Standard Catalog of World Coins (1901–present). KP Books. p. 69. ISBN 0-87349-987-5.
- Shillings article on Cruzis Coins
- Harper Ian; Slizys, Nerida (1996). "Measuring Seignoirage in Australia". Economic Papers: A Journal of Applied Economics and Policy. 15 (2): 20–21. doi:10.1111/j.1759-3441.1996.tb00112.x.
- Holland, Paul (2005). "Perth Mint Proof Coins 1955-1963". Journal of the Numismatic Association of Australia. 16: 3–45.
- Saxton, Jon (2003). "The 1925 shilling". Journal of the Numismatic Association of Australia. 14: 32–39.
- Johnston, Kate (30 December 2021). "An interview with Education Visitors Service at the Royal Australian Mint" (Interview). Interviewed by Duncan Eddy. Canberra: Education Visitor Services, The Royal Australian Mint.
- "The Shilling Ram" (PDF). Merino NSW.
- "Why do we have the letters 'FD' on our coins". History Extra. BBC History Revealed.
- Reserve Bank of Australia (2021). "A New Currency". Reserve Bank of Australia.
- Royal Australian Mint (2021). Commonwealth Coinage (Report). Royal Australian Mint. (Retrieved from the information wall in the museum section of the Royal Australian Mint).
- Royal Australian Mint (2021). Development of Pre-Decimal Coins (Report). Royal Australian Mint. (Retrieved from the information wall in the museum section of the Royal Australian Mint).
- Royal Australian Mint (2021). The Circulating Coins of Queen Elizabeth II (Report). Royal Australian Mint. (Retrieved from the information wall in the museum section of the Royal Australian Mint).
- Royal Australian Mint (2021). The End of Shillings and Pence (Report). Royal Australian Mint. (Retrieved from the information wall in the museum section of the Royal Australian Mint).
- Royal Australian Mint (2021). The Sterling Age (Report). Royal Australian Mint. (Retrieved from the information wall in the museum section of the Royal Australian Mint).
- Royal Australian Mint (2017). Australian Coin History (Report). Royal Australian Mint. (Retrieved from the information wall in the museum section of the Royal Australian Mint).
- Royal Australian Mint (2021). "Before decimal currency – what did Australia use?" (PDF). Royal Australian Mint.

Preceded by Shilling (British)	Shilling; 1910–1966	Succeeded by Ten cent coin (Australian)
