= Australian twenty-cent coin =

Current denomination of Australian currency

Twenty cents
- Australia
- Value: 0.2 AUD
- Mass: 11.3 g
- Diameter: 28.65 mm
- Thickness: 2.50 mm
- Edge: milled
- Composition: 75% Copper, 25% Nickel
- Years of minting: 1966–present
- Catalog number: —

Obverse
- Design: Queen Elizabeth II (1966–2023); King Charles III (2024–present)
- Designer: Various (1966–2023); Dan Thorne (2024–present)
- Design date: 2024

Reverse
- Design: Platypus
- Designer: Stuart Devlin
- Design date: 1966

The twenty-cent coin is a coin of the Australian dollar, worth 1/5 of a dollar. It was first issued with conversion to decimal currency on 14 February 1966, replacing the florin, which was equivalent to two shillings, a tenth of a pound.

Obverse face designs have been: from 1966 to 1984, the head of Queen Elizabeth II by Arnold Machin; from 1985 to 1998, the head by Raphael Maklouf; from 1999 to 2019, the head by Ian Rank-Broadley; and in 2019 the head by Jody Clark was introduced. The obverse has the inscription AUSTRALIA and the year of issue on the right hand side, and ELIZABETH II on the left hand side.

Stuart Devlin's platypus, introduced in 1966, became the standard design for the reverse face.

The United Nations 20c was the first commemorative 20c coin issued for circulation in 1995. Commemorative designs had been issued for circulation previously in other denominations.

20c coins are legal tender for amounts not exceeding $5.

== Commemorative coins ==
There have been various commemorative issues, including:

- 1995: 50th Anniversary of the United Nations (with the UN emblem).
- 2001: Commemoration for Sir Donald Bradman (1908–2001).
- 2001: Centenary of Australian Federation: a set of nine coins; six for the states, two for the territories and one for Norfolk Island. The designs were made by students from each of the areas.
- 2003: Commemorating Australia's Volunteers. "AUSTRALIA'S VOLUNTEERS – MAKING A DIFFERENCE"
- 2005: 60 years since the end of the Second World War, with WORLD WAR 1939–1945 COMING HOME. The design was inspired by a photo from the Australian War Memorial collection.
- 2010: Centenary of the Australian Taxation Office.
- 2011: Wedding of HRH Prince William and Catherine Middleton: Duke and Duchess of Cambridge.
- 2011: Centenary of International Women's Day.
- 2011: 10th anniversary of the International Year of Volunteers. (IYV +10)
- 2013: Centenary of Canberra
- 2016: 50th Anniversary of decimal currency – unusually for Australian coins, this is a commemorative obverse; the reverse is as normal.

== Varieties ==
Excepting commemorative varieties, there have been a number of varieties of regular issue coins identified by collectors, on both the obverse and reverse faces. The first of these seen is a highly prized variety of the 1966 issue, with a "wave" on the top of the bottom stroke of the 2 in "20" on the reverse face. These coins are sold for over A$200, depending on condition. Other variants of the reverse face generally involve the length and number of claws of the platypus; these change if incorrect stamping pressure is used in creation of dies for the coins, most frequently seen on coins produced at foreign mints.

There have been several variations of the Broadley head obverse, including:

- 1999 with thicker lettering.
- 2000–2003 slightly reduced lettering by 0.01 mm.
- The 2004 issue had two forms:
  - "the small head": a head reduced all around by 2 mm, and thicker lettering. The version was in general circulation.
  - "the large head": an issue identical to the 2000–03 obverse. This version was only available in mint packs though, it is rarely found in circulation.
- 2005 non-commemorative and subsequent issues have reverted to "the large head" obverse.
- The 2005 WWII commemorative issue had an even larger head.

== 1981 mintings ==
In 1981 more 20-cent coins were required than the Royal Australian Mint facility in Canberra could produce, so thato some coins were minted at other facilities. The Canadian impression of the 20-cent coin is known as the "Ottawa Mint" version. This may be incorrect as the Ottawa Mint (and the Perth Mint) only produced precious metal commemorative coins from 1976; the coins may have been produced at the Royal Canadian Mint's Winnipeg facilities.

Due to differences in the milling and annealing process, the Canadian variety of the 1981 20-cent coin is distinctive to attentive collectors and cash handlers. The top and bottom edges of the milling is rounded over, not squared like the Australian and London varieties, and despite being in circulation for well over 25 years, even when well worn, the fields remain shiny, and not dulled like those produced at other mints. These qualities are also observed in Canadian coinage of similar ages.

Some of the Canadian coins were produced with a shortened first toe on the right claw. These are referred to as the "3 1/2 claw" variety.

== Mintages ==
The quantity of 1981 and 1982 mintages of the 20-cent coin was sufficient to not require many coins released for circulation until 1990.

The 1983 and 1984 coins were struck for circulation with mintages of 55.11 million and 27.82 million coins respectively, but were never released for general circulation. Later they were resmelted by the Royal Australian Mint, leaving the coins relatively rare. Significant premiums have been paid for a small number of mint rolls from these years that have shown up in auctions.

The Royal Australian Mint website reports an issue of 2.7 million coins for 1985 and 0.2 million for 1988. No coins dated to between 1989 and 1993 were minted for circulation, and no standard platypus design coins dated to 1995 were minted for circulation.

In 2022, the production cost of a 20c coin was more than its face value.

== See also ==
- Coins of the Australian dollar

Preceded by Florin (Australian coin)	Twenty cents (Australian); 1966–present	Succeeded by Present
