= Razoo =

Razoo may refer to:

- Brass razoo, an Australian term
- Razoo, Iran, a village in Hormozgan Province, Iran
