= Australian one-cent coin =

Former denomination of Australian currency

One cent
- Australia
- Value: 0.01 AUD
- Mass: 2.60 g
- Diameter: 17.65 mm
- Edge: Plain
- Composition: 97% copper 2.5% zinc 0.5% tin
- Years of minting: 1966–1991, 2006 and 2010–2016

Obverse
- Design: Elizabeth II, Queen of Australia
- Designer: Raphael Maklouf
- Design date: 1985

Reverse
- Design: Feathertail glider (Acrobates pygmaeus)
- Designer: Stuart Devlin
- Design date: 1966

The Australian one-cent coin (in circulation 1966–1992) was the lowest-denomination coin of the Australian dollar, valued at 1/100 of a dollar. It was introduced on 14 February 1966 in the decimalisation of Australian currency and was withdrawn from circulation in 1992 (along with the two-cent coin). It is still minted as a non-circulating coin. A one-cent coin in 1966 would have a purchasing power equal to about 16 cents in 2023.

One-cent and two-cent coins are legal tender only up to the sum of 20 cents (preventing large debts from being paid in small coins).

== Description ==
From 1966 until 1984 the obverse featured the portrait of Queen Elizabeth II by Arnold Machin. It was changed in 1985 to a version by Raphael Maklouf, which remained until its withdrawal from circulation in 1992.

The reverse side of the coin features the image of a feathertail glider (Acrobates pygmaeus), a gliding possum unique to Australian states bordering the Pacific Ocean. The image was designed by Stuart Devlin, who designed the reverses of all of the original Australian decimal coins.

== Production ==
The first issue (1966) was produced by three mints: 146.5 million were minted at the Royal Australian Mint in Canberra, with 239 million at the Melbourne Mint and 26.6 million at the Perth Mint. With the exception of 1966 and 1981, all other one-cent coins have been produced at the Canberra mint. In 1981, 40.3 million were struck at the British Royal Mint in Llantrisant, Wales, as well as 183.6 million in Canberra. The only year when it was not minted during its years in general circulation was 1986. It was last minted in 1990.

The decision to remove the one and two-cent coins was confirmed by the Treasurer in a Budget Speech on 21 August 1990. The removal was due to inflation reducing its value, and the high cost of minting. Around the same time, other Commonwealth countries removed their bronze coins; New Zealand removed its one and two-cent coins in 1990, while the United Kingdom and Ireland changed their bronze one and two-pence coins into copper-plated steel.

The one-cent coin was produced as proof and uncirculated coins in 1986, 1991, 2006 and 2010 as part of mint sets. Other compositions were also used for one-cent coins such as the 1978 (incorrectly listed as 1968 at Downies) specimen struck in aluminium or fine silver proofs in 1991, 2006 and 2011.

After removal from circulation, some of the one-cent and two-cent coins were melted down for plating bronze medals for the 2000 Sydney Olympics.

In 2017, a limited edition Possum Magic themed coin set was released. A one-cent coin is included that shows Hush the Possum reading a book. In 2019, a limited edition Mr Squiggle friends themed coin set was released. A one-cent coin is included that shows the moon from the cover of Mr Squiggle.

== General references ==
- Ian W. Pitt, ed. (2000). Renniks Australian Coin and Banknote Values (19th ed.). Chippendale, NSW: Renniks Publications. ISBN 0-9585574-4-6.

Preceded by Denomination created	One cent (Australian); 1966–1991	Succeeded by Withdrawn from circulation
