= Tuvaluan dollar =

Currency of Tuvalu

ISO 4217
- Code: None (TVD unofficially)

Units of account
- Symbol: $, $T, TV$
- Symbol
- cent: ¢

Denominations
- Banknotes: Australian dollar notes circulate
- Coins: ¢5, ¢10, ¢20, ¢50, $1

Demographics
- User(s): Tuvalu (alongside Australian dollar)

Issuance
- Issuing authority: Government of Tuvalu
- Mint: Perth Mint
- Website: www.perthmint.com

Valuation
- Inflation: 3.30%
- Pegged with: Australian dollar at par

The Tuvaluan dollar is one of the currencies of Tuvalu, whose unofficial international currency code is TVD. Tuvalu has never had banknotes of its own, and has been issuing coins since 1976. However, the Tuvaluan dollar is used as a unit of account, and is pegged to the Australian dollar (the other currency of Tuvalu) at parity. From 1966 to 1976, Tuvalu officially used the Australian dollar. In 1976, Tuvalu began issuing its own coins, which continue to circulate alongside Australian coins. Tuvalu continues to use Australian banknotes. Tuvaluan coins are not legal tender in Australia. Similar to the Faroese króna's relationship to the Danish krone and the Panamanian balboa's relationship to the United States dollar, the Tuvaluan dollar is not an independent currency, but a variation of the Australian dollar.

Tuvalu does not have a monetary authority or central bank, and the National Bank of Tuvalu, the only bank in Tuvalu, performs some monetary functions for the government, including the holding of government accounts and foreign assets.

Other currencies that had been used in Tuvalu have been the British pound sterling, prior to the introduction of the Australian dollar, as well as the US dollar, during the World War II American occupation of the islands. Gilbert and Ellice Islands banknotes had also been used in Tuvalu. These notes were cashier's cheques backed in pounds rather than an official, independent currency. The yen-backed Oceania pound was used in parts of the Gilberts (now Kiribati), but Japanese influence never actually reached the Ellice Chain (now Tuvalu).

== Coins ==
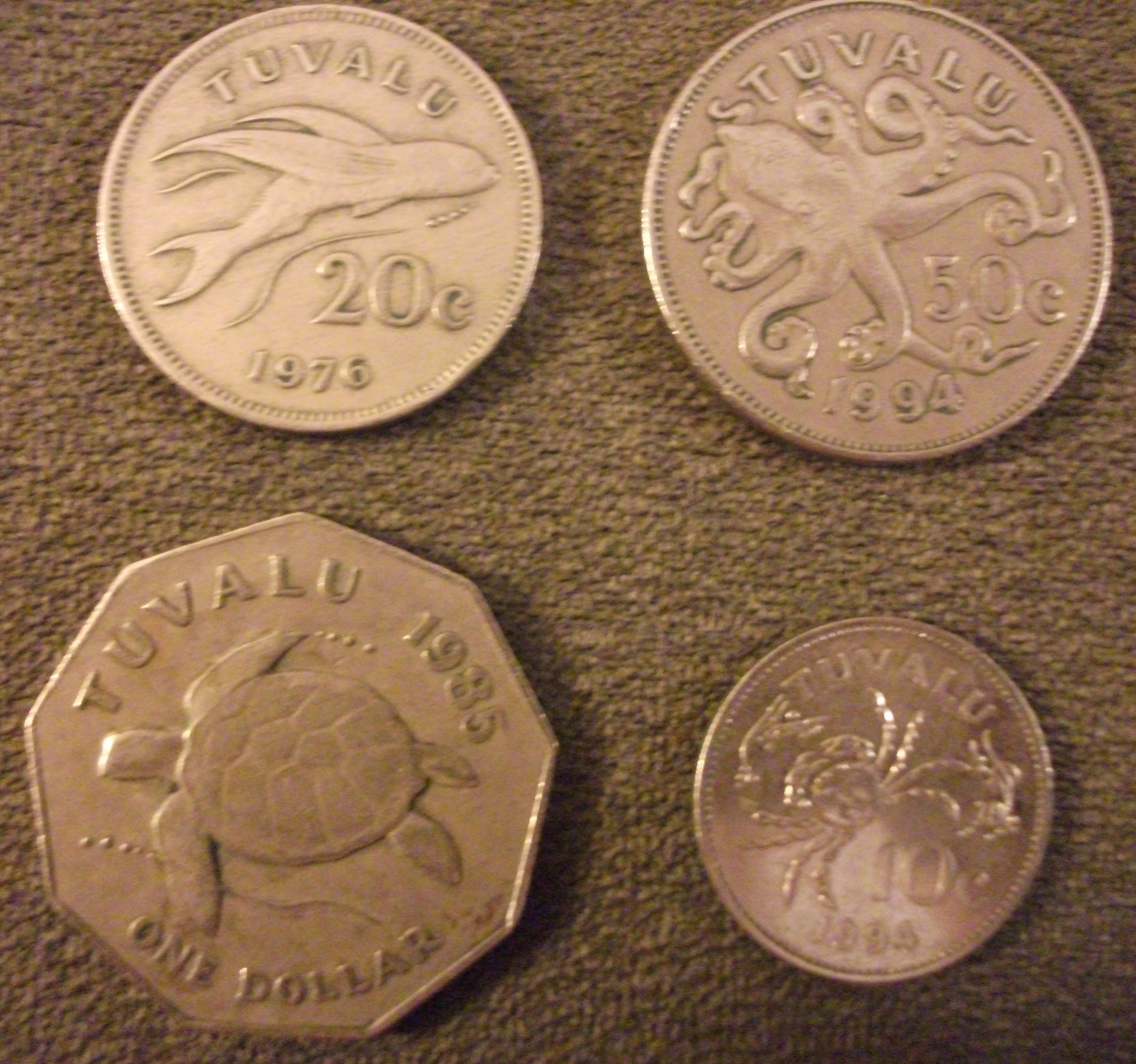
Reverse of the 10, 20, 50 cents and $1 coins of Tuvalu

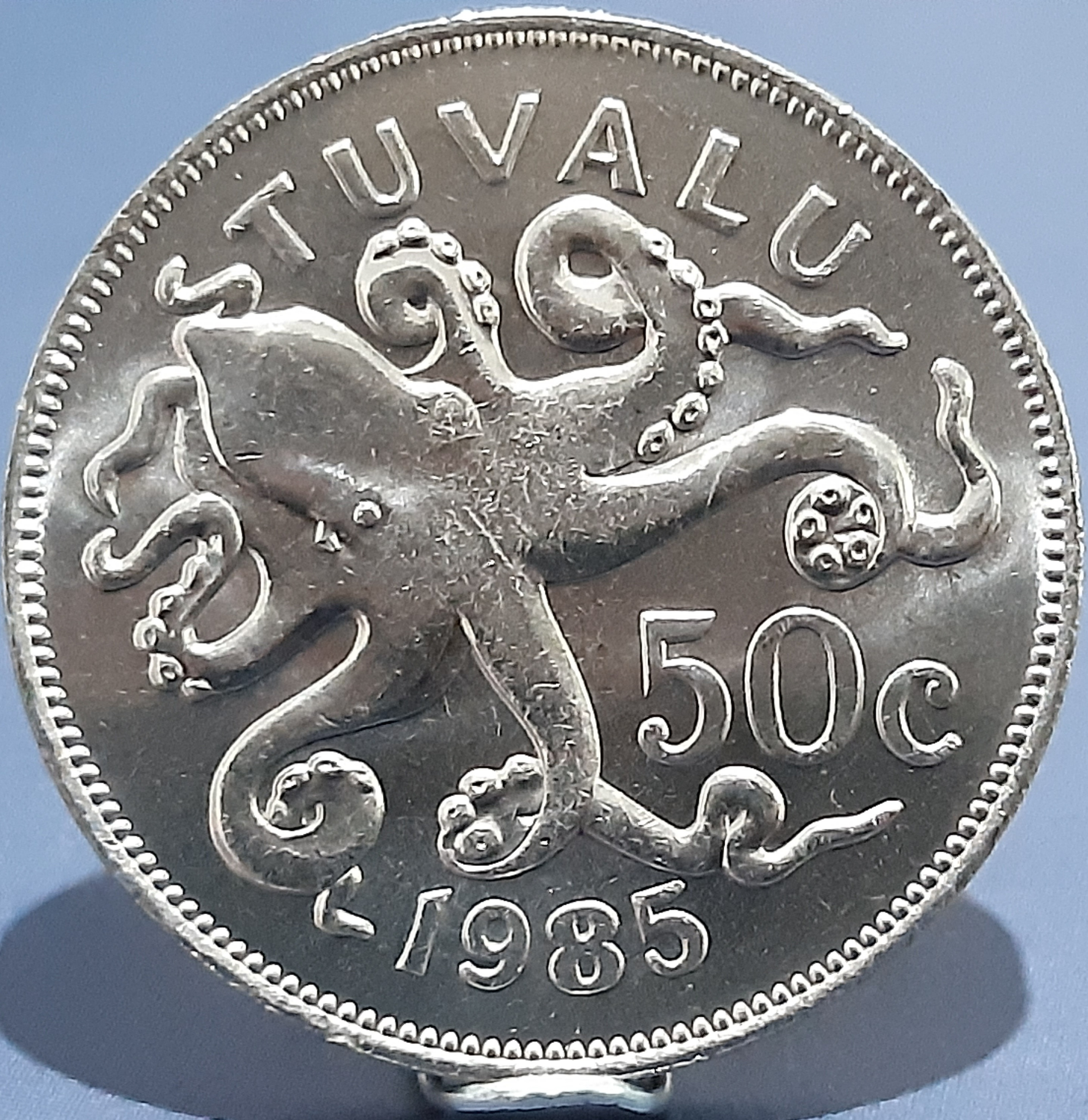
Tuvalu $0.50 (A)

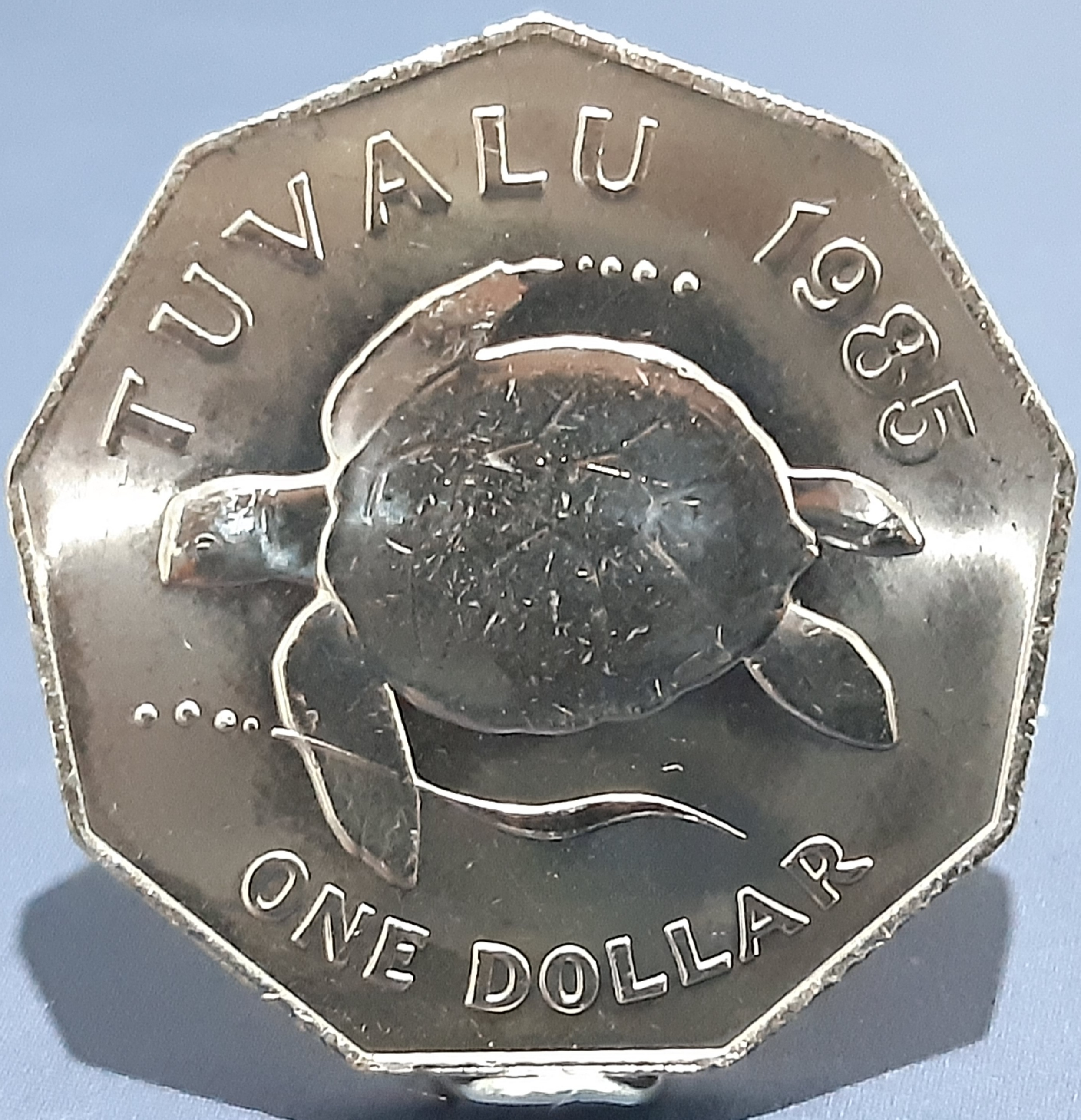
Tuvalu $1.00 (A)

In 1976, corresponding with its slated independence, Tuvalu's first coins were introduced in denominations of 1, 2, 5, 10, 20, and 50 cents and 1 dollar. The set, designed by John Donald, features an aquatic theme. The bronze 1 and 2 cents and the cupro-nickel 5, 10, and 20 cents were the same size, weight, and composition as the corresponding Australian coins they were set to constitute. However, the cupro-nickel 50-cent piece was distinct from the dodecagonal (twelve-sided) Australian 50-cent coin in that it was round with plain edges. The enneagonal (nine-sided) cupro-nickel 1 dollar piece was unique not only by its odd shape but also because it predated the Australian 1 dollar coin by eight years. It was also issued long before the trend toward larger denomination coins became much more widespread in many countries. The nine sides on the dollar are meant to represent each of the nine islands and atolls composing the Tuvalu chain. Each of the coins depicts a sea animal that is native to the area, with the only exception to that being the 1 cent, which depicts an empty spider conch shell washed up on the shore.

The 1976 series also included the introduction of Tuvalu's first silver and gold proof bullion coins. A silver 5 dollar piece and a gold 50 dollar piece. They are considered an official release and legal tender within Tuvalu.

Although Australia withdrew their 1 and 2 cent coins from circulation in 1991, there was still demand for the two lower denominations in Tuvalu, so these continued to be retained well after Australia discontinued use. However, as prices and shipping costs have progressively risen, the 1 and 2 cent coins have since been withdrawn from circulation.

Australia introduced a $2 coin to replace the note in 1988, but Tuvaluan $2 coins have never been introduced. Instead, the Australian piece circulates in place. In recent years, Tuvaluans have also taken a preference to Australia's smaller, round, brass dollar over their own large, clumsy nonagonal ones, and they are thus seen a little less often.

In 1994, the Queen's profile was changed in tandem with many other Commonwealth states to the more recent Raphael Maklouf design. Older coins dated 1976-1985 feature the Arnold Machin design. The coins dated 1994 were minted in very limited numbers and are today valuable to collectors. After the 1994 issue, Tuvaluan coins ceased to be produced, and Australian coins were sent in their stead. However, Tuvalu coins remain as legal tender and continue to circulate alongside Australian ones.

Tuvalu also issues a fair number of non-circulating bullion-type coins and colourized commemoratives. These non-circulating bullion coins are produced by the Perth Mint, which is owned by the Government of Western Australia. The deal between the Government of Tuvalu (as issuing authority) and Perth Mint allows Tuvalu to receive a minimum of about $200,000 per year in royalties from the production of these coins.

Queen Elizabeth II was depicted on all coins issued by Tuvalu until 2024, when an effigy of her successor, King Charles III, was finally approved and used for the first time on some premium bullion coins. There have been calls from some politicians to abolish Tuvalu's monarchy and remove the sovereign's image from all future coins; however, a majority vote decided otherwise.

The reverse of each coin is depicted as follows:

Value	Diameter	Composition	1976–1994	
Value	Diameter	Composition	Obverse	Reverse
1 cent	18 mm	Bronze	Queen	Spider conch shell
2 cents	21 mm	Bronze	Queen	Stingray
5 cents	19 mm	Cupronickel	Queen	Tiger Shark
10 cents	24 mm	Cupronickel	Queen	Red-eyed crab
20 cents	29 mm	Cupronickel	Queen	Flying Fish
50 cents	32 mm	Cupronickel	Queen	Octopus
1 dollar	30–35 mm	Cupronickel	Queen	Sea Turtle

== Banknotes ==
In 1942, local banknotes were issued by the colonial government of the Gilbert and Ellice Islands in denominations of 1, 2, 5, and 10 shillings and £1 with equivalent value to the Australian pound.

Since 1966, the official currency of Tuvalu is the Australian dollar, with Australian banknotes having been in use prior to and after independence. $1, $2, and $10 notes were originally the only denominations sent, but $5 and higher denominations have since come into use. However, after independence was achieved, the $1 note was withdrawn from circulation to encourage the use of the $1 coin.

== See also ==
- Kiribati dollar
- Australian dollar
