= Kiribati dollar =

Currency of Kiribati

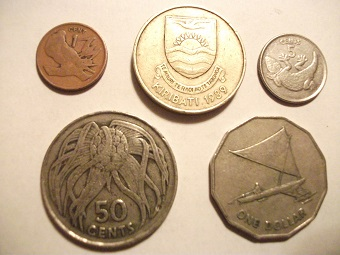
- Coins of the Kiribati dollar

ISO 4217
- Code: none (KID unofficially)

Units of account
- Symbol: $
- Subunit
- 1/100: cent
- Symbol
- cent: ¢

Denominations
- Banknotes: Australian notes circulate
- Coins: 5¢, 10¢, 20¢, 50¢, $1, $2

Demographics
- Date of introduction: 1979
- User(s): Kiribati (alongside Australian dollar)

Issuance
- Issuing authority: Government of Kiribati
- Mint: Not produced since 1992

Valuation
- Inflation: 0.5%
- Source: The World Factbook, 2005 est.
- Pegged with: Australian dollar at par

The Kiribati dollar is one of the two official currencies of Kiribati. The Kiribati coins are pegged at 1:1 ratio to the Australian dollar, the other official currency of Kiribati. Kiribati coins were issued in 1979 and circulate alongside banknotes and coins of the Australian dollar. In present day, Kiribati coins are rare in comparison to Australian coins with the last minor emission made in 1992, and these old coins are now generally collector's items. The complete emissions of coins were made in 1979 and in 1989 for the tenth anniversary of independence.

== History ==
Before independence, Australian coins were used in Kiribati (then part of the Gilbert and Ellice Islands) from 1966 until 1979. Previous to Australia's introduction of the dollar, the Australian pound, since World War I, was chiefly used throughout the islands, though Gilbert and Ellice Islands banknotes issued in the 1940s were also in use and were redeemable for Pound Sterling at face value.

During Japanese occupation of the islands during World War II, the Oceanian pound, an all banknote currency created by the Japanese Government to be a universal currency for the Pacific, was in use. The Australian pound was restored, always in use in the atolls not occupied by Japan, as the official currency after the war ended.

A call to issue coinage for an independent Kiribati in 1979 was made to legitimise its new political status, and although Australian banknotes would be used, the decision to issue domestic coins was widely favoured and accepted. A two dollar coin was introduced in 1989 to replace the note and celebrate the nation's tenth anniversary.

== Coins ==
Kiribati's first coins were introduced in 1979 following independence and were directly pegged to the Australian dollar. The coins were initially issued in denominations of 1, 2, 5, 10, 20 and 50-cents, and 1 dollar.

Except for the 50 cents and 1 dollar pieces, all of these coins are the same size, weight, and composition as the corresponding Australian coins, with the 1 and 2 cents pieces composed of bronze and the 5, 10, 20, 50 cents pieces, and $1 being composed of cupro-nickel. As usual for other Pacific island states, only the lower denominations (1-20 cents) share any commonality, with the largest denominations being unique to their respective countries. The 50-cents piece is round with reeded edges, unlike the dodecagonal (twelve sided) Australian equivalent. The Kiribati 1 dollar is the same twelve sided shape as Australia's 50 cents coin, but it is smaller and weighs 4.3 grams less than both the Australian and Kiribati half dollars.

In 1989, nickel-brass 2 dollar coins were introduced coinciding with Kiribati's tenth anniversary of independence, and followed Australia's issuance of its 2 dollar coin and withdrawal of the 2 dollar note in 1988. The Kiribati $2 piece is round and much larger than Australia's comparatively tiny $2 piece, with the same circumference of the 20-cents coin and a thickness similar to the British 1 Pound coin.

Most Kiribati coins are dated 1979, marking an event to coincide with independence, but with some exception. In 1992, Kiribati began producing 1 and 2 cents pieces in copper-plated steel and 5 cents pieces in nickel-plated steel re-struck off of 1979 planchets. These coins are distinct in their lustre and obvious attraction to a magnet and were produced to compensate for Australia's discontinuation of the two lowest denominations. However, a small mintage of the 1992 issue 1 cent was struck in bronze. 10-, 20-, 50-cents, and $1 coins have yet to appear as later issues and do not appear to be restrike coins. So most of the denominations remain as a single date issue. Although Kiribati retained 1 and 2 cents coins well after Australia demoted theirs, redundancy and devaluation has slowly removed these coins from general circulation.

Kiribati no longer issues local coinage and has not for quite some time, so most examples are either uncirculated from the bank or heavily used. Australian coinage has also become more frequent than local coinage in more populated regions for these reasons as the government feels it more practical and cost effective to use Australian coins rather than mint additional Kiribati coins.

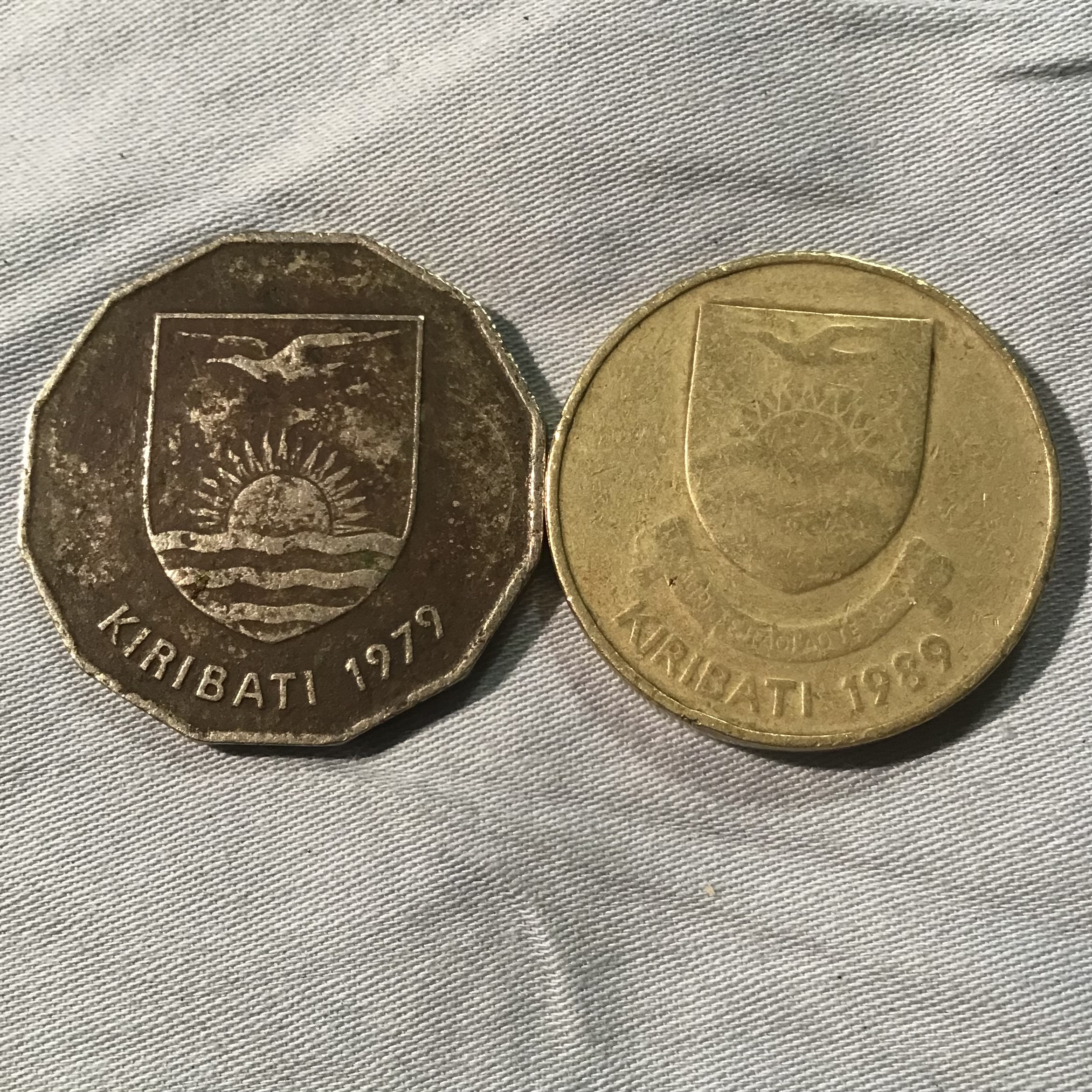
$1 and $2 coins, heavily used

The primary side of all Kiribati coins depicts the national crest, while the obverse depict flora, fauna, and items of cultural importance to the islands. The coins were designed by sculptor and engraver Michael Hibbit.

Reverse depictions are as follows:

Value	Diameter	Composition	1979–1989	
Value	Diameter	Composition	Obverse	Reverse
1 cent	17.5 mm	Bronze	Coat of arms	Frigatebirds
2 cents	21.6 mm	Bronze	Coat of arms	Babai plant
5 cents	19.3 mm	Cupronickel	Coat of arms	Gecko (Note: Often described by mistake as a Tokay gecko.)
10 cents	23.6 mm	Cupronickel	Coat of arms	Breadfruit
20 cents	28.45 mm	Cupronickel	Coat of arms	Dolphins
50 cents	31.65 mm	Cupronickel	Coat of arms	Pandanus tree
1 dollar	30 mm	Cupronickel	Coat of arms	Outrigger canoe
2 dollars	29 mm	Nickel-Brass	Coat of arms	Maneaba/"Tenth Anniversary of Independence"

== Banknotes ==
Australian pound Sterling banknotes were introduced to the region in 1914 shortly before the Gilbert Islands gained status from a protectorate to a crown colony of Great Britain in 1916. These continued to be the main source of exchange until the decimalisation of 1966.

In 1942, local banknotes were issued under the authority of the Gilbert and Ellice Islands Government and were locally produced with a primitive and austere design. These notes were valued on parity with sterling and issued in denominations of 1, 2, 5, and 10 shillings and 1 pound. After the wartime emergency had passed these notes were discontinued and gradually phased out. Due to their scarcity, these notes are highly collectable.

In 1966, the new Australian dollar became the new official currency of the Gilbert and Ellice Islands, replacing the pound notes. Only 1, 2, and 10 dollars were used at first, but 5, 20, 50, and 100 dollars were later sent for use. This continued to be the official currency after the break-up of the joint Gilbert and Ellice colonies and following independence of the Gilberts and annexed territories as Kiribati. The 1 dollar notes circulated alongside a local coin.

The 1 and 2 dollar notes were later withdrawn in favour of Kiribati- and Australian- issued coins.

== See also ==
- Tuvaluan dollar
- Australian dollar
