= Australian dollar =

Currency of Australia

A$, AU$
$50 banknote (2020, obverse)
$1 coin (reverse)

ISO 4217
- Code: AUD (numeric: 036)
- Subunit: 0.01

Units of account
- Base unit: dollar
- Plural: dollars
- Symbol: $
- Subunit
- 1/100: cent
- Plural
- cent: cents
- Symbol
- cent: c

Denominations
- Banknotes
- Freq. used: $5, $10, $20, $50, $100
- Rarely used: $1, $2 (no longer in production)
- Coins
- Freq. used: 5c, 10c, 20c, 50c, $1, $2
- Rarely used: 1c, 2c (no longer in production)

Demographics
- Date of introduction: 14 February 1966; 60 years ago
- Replaced: Australian pound
- User(s): Australia 7 external territories: Ashmore and Cartier Islands Australian Antarctic Territory Christmas Island Cocos (Keeling) Islands Coral Sea Islands Heard Island and McDonald Islands Norfolk Island; 3 other countries: Kiribati (alongside Kiribati dollar) Nauru Tuvalu (alongside Tuvaluan dollar)

Issuance
- Central bank: Reserve Bank of Australia
- Website: rba.gov.au
- Printer: Note Printing Australia
- Website: noteprinting.com
- Mint: Royal Australian Mint
- Website: ramint.gov.au

Valuation
- Inflation: 4.3% (Australia only)
- Source: Reserve Bank of Australia, September 2026
- Pegged by: Tuvaluan dollar and Kiribati dollar at par

The Australian dollar (sign: $; code: AUD; also abbreviated A$ or sometimes AU$ to distinguish it from other dollar-denominated currencies; and also referred to as the dollar or Aussie dollar) is the official currency and legal tender of Australia, including all of its external territories, and three independent sovereign Pacific Island states: Kiribati, Nauru, and Tuvalu. In April 2025, it was the seventh most-traded currency in the foreign exchange market and as of Q1 2024 the sixth most-held reserve currency in global reserves.

The Australian dollar was introduced as a decimal currency on 14 February 1966 to replace the non-decimal Australian pound, with the conversion rate of two dollars to the pound (£A1 = A$2). Each dollar is subdivided into 100 cents. The $ symbol precedes the amount. On the introduction of the currency, the $ symbol was intended to have two strokes, but the version with one stroke has also always been acceptable.

In 2023, there were A$4.4 billion in coins and A$101.3 billion in notes of Australian currency in circulation, or around A$6,700 per person in Australia, which includes cash reserves held by the banking system and cash in circulation in other countries or held as a foreign exchange reserve.

== Constitutional basis ==
Section 51(xii) of the Constitution of Australia gives the Commonwealth (federal) Parliament the power to legislate with respect to "currency, coinage, and legal tender". The states are not allowed to coin money, in accordance with section 115 which provides that "[a] State shall not coin money, nor make anything but gold and silver coin a legal tender in payment of debts." Australian circulating coins are now produced at the Royal Australian Mint in Canberra.

== History ==
=== Background ===
Before Federation in 1901, the six colonies that comprised Australia had separate currencies, all of which closely replicated the British currency system, and were usually exchangeable with each other on a one-to-one basis. Hence Federation was not seen as urgently requiring a single, unified currency. For another 10 years, colonial banknotes and coins continued to be the main circulating currencies.

In 1902, a select committee of the House of Representatives, chaired by George Edwards, had recommended that Australia adopt a single, national decimal currency, with a pound divided into ten florins and each florin comprising 100 cents. However, the recommendation was not acted upon.

The Australian pound (£A) was introduced in 1910, at par with the pound sterling – £A1 = £1 (UK). Like the UK pound, it was divided into 240 pence, or 20 shillings (each comprising 12 pence). In December 1931, the Australian currency was devalued by 25%, so that one pound five shillings Australian was equivalent to one pound sterling.

In 1937, a banking royal commission, appointed by the Lyons government, recommended that Australia adopt "a system of decimal coinage ... based upon the division of the Australian pound into 1000 parts". This recommendation was not accepted either.

=== Adoption of the dollar ===
1966 government advertisement jingle on the change to decimal currency to the tune of Click Go the Shears

In February 1959, treasurer Harold Holt appointed a Decimal Currency Committee, chaired by Walter D. Scott, to examine the merits of decimalisation. The committee reported in August 1960 in favour of decimalisation and proposed that a new currency be introduced (from February 1963), to be modelled on South Africa's replacement of the South African pound with the rand (worth 10 shillings, or 1/2 pound). The Menzies government announced its support for decimalisation in July 1961, but delayed the process in order to give further consideration to the implementation process. In April 1963, Holt announced that a decimal currency was scheduled to be introduced in February 1966, with a base unit equal to 10 shillings, and that a Decimal Currency Board would be established to oversee the transition process.

A public consultation process was held in which over 1,000 names were suggested for the new currency. This was reduced to a shortlist of seven names: austral, crown, dollar, pound, regal, tasman and royal. In June 1963, Holt announced that the new currency would be called the "royal". This met with widespread public disapproval, and three months later it was announced that it would instead be named the "dollar".

The pound was replaced by the dollar on 14 February 1966 with the conversion rate of A$2 = £A1 (so that A$1 = 10 shillings and one cent = 1.2d). For example, a pre-decimal amount of nine pounds, sixteen shillings and sixpence (£A9 16s 6d) became $19.65 in terms of dollars and cents. Since Australia was still part of the fixed-exchange sterling area, the exchange rate was fixed to the pound sterling at a rate of A$1 = 8s sterling (or £1 (UK) = A$2.50, and in turn £1 (UK) = US$ 2.80). In 1967, Australia effectively left the sterling area when the pound sterling was devalued against the US dollar from US$2.80 to US$2.40, but the Australian dollar chose to retain its peg to the US dollar at A$1 = US$1.12 (hence appreciating in value versus sterling).

The Australian dollar is legal tender in its external territories: Christmas Island, Cocos (Keeling) Islands, and Norfolk Island; and is also official currency in Kiribati, Nauru, and Tuvalu. It was legal tender in Papua New Guinea until 31 December 1975 when it was replaced by the Papua New Guinean kina, and in Solomon Islands until 1977 when it was replaced by the Solomon Islands dollar.

== Coins ==
In 1966, coins were introduced in denominations of 1 and 2 cents (bronze); 5, 10, and 20 cents (cupronickel; 75% copper, 25% nickel); and 50 cents (silver, then cupronickel). The 50-cent coins in 80% silver were no longer minted after March 1968 due to the intrinsic value of the silver content rising to exceed the face value of the coins. Aluminium bronze (92% copper, 6% aluminium, 2% nickel) 1 dollar coins were introduced in 1984, followed by aluminium bronze 2 dollar coins in 1988, to replace the banknotes of that value. In everyday Australian parlance, these coins collectively are referred to as "gold coins". 1 and 2 cent coins were discontinued in 1991 and withdrawn from circulation in 1992; since then cash transactions have been rounded to the nearest 5 cents.

Australian coins
Image		Value	Technical parameters				Description			Date of first minting
Obverse	Reverse	Value	Diameter	Thickness	Weight	Composition	Edge	Obverse	Reverse	Date of first minting
		1c	17.65 mm	>1.4 mm	2.60 g	97% copper 2.5% zinc 0.5% tin	Plain	Queen Elizabeth II	Feathertail glider	1966–1991 (no longer issued)
		2c	21.59 mm	<1.9 mm	5.20 g	97% copper 2.5% zinc 0.5% tin	Plain	Queen Elizabeth II	Frill-necked lizard	1966–1991 (no longer issued)
		5c	19.41 mm	1.3 mm	2.83 g	Cupronickel; 75% copper 25% nickel	Reeded	Queen; Elizabeth II, King Charles III (since 2024)	Echidna	1966
		10c	23.60 mm	1.5 mm	5.65 g	Cupronickel; 75% copper 25% nickel	Reeded	Queen; Elizabeth II, King Charles III (since 2024)	Superb lyrebird	1966
		20c	28.65 mm	2.0 mm	11.3 g	Cupronickel; 75% copper 25% nickel	Reeded	Queen; Elizabeth II, King Charles III (since 2024)	Platypus	1966
		50c	Dodecagon 31.65 mm (across flats)	2.0 mm	15.55 g	Cupronickel; 75% copper 25% nickel	Plain	Queen; Elizabeth II, King Charles III (since 2024)	Coat of arms	1969
		$1	25.00 mm	2.8 mm	9.00 g	92% copper 6% aluminium 2% nickel	Interrupted milled	Queen; Elizabeth II, King Charles III (since 2023)	Five kangaroos	1984
		$2	20.50 mm	3.0 mm	6.60 g	92% copper 6% aluminium 2% nickel	Interrupted milled	Queen; Elizabeth II, King Charles III (since 2024)	Aboriginal elder and Southern Cross	1988
These images are to scale at 2.5 pixels per millimetre. For table standards, see the coin specification table. Source: Royal Australian Mint.

Australia's coins are produced by the Royal Australian Mint, which is located in the nation's capital, Canberra. Since opening in 1965, the Mint has produced more than 14 billion circulating coins, and has the capacity to produce more than two million coins per day, or more than 600 million coins per year.

Current Australian 5, 10 and 20 cent coins are identical in size to the former Australian, New Zealand, and British sixpence, shilling, and two shilling (florin) coins. Pre-decimal Australian coins remain legal tender for 10 cents per shilling. Before 2006 the old New Zealand 5, 10 and 20 cent coins were often mistaken for Australian coins of the same value, and vice versa, and therefore circulated in both countries. The UK replaced these coins with smaller versions from 1990 to 1993, as did New Zealand in 2006. Still, some confusion occurs with the larger-denomination coins in the two countries. Australia's $1 coin is similar in size to New Zealand's $2 coin, and the New Zealand $1 coin is similar in size to Australia's $2 coin.

With a mass of 15.55 grams (0.549 oz) and a diameter of 31.51 millimetres (1 1/4 in), the Australian 50-cent coin is one of the largest coins that is being circulated in the world today.

=== Commemorative coins ===
The Royal Australian Mint also has an international reputation for producing quality numismatic coins. It has first issued commemorative 50-cent coins in 1970, commemorating James Cook's exploration along the east coast of the Australian continent, followed in 1977 by a coin for Queen Elizabeth II's Silver Jubilee (25th year of rule), the wedding of Charles, Prince of Wales and Lady Diana Spencer in 1981, the Brisbane Commonwealth Games in 1982, and the Australian Bicentenary in 1988. Issues expanded into greater numbers in the 1990s and the 21st century, responding to collector demand. Commemorative designs have also been featured on the other circulating denominations.

In commemoration of the 40th anniversary of Australia using the decimal currency, the 2006 mint proof and uncirculated sets included one- and two-cent coins. In early 2013, Australia's first triangular coin was introduced to mark the 25th anniversary of the opening of Parliament House. The silver $5 coin is 99.9% silver, and depicts Parliament House as viewed from one of its courtyards.

== Banknotes ==
=== First series ===
The first paper issues of the Australian dollar were issued in 1966. The $1, $2, $10 and $20 notes had exact equivalents in the former pound notes. The $5 note was issued in 1967, the $50 was issued in 1973 and the $100 was issued in 1984.

The $1 banknote was later replaced by a $1 coin in 1984, while the $2 banknote was replaced by a smaller $2 coin in 1988. Although no longer printed, all previous notes of the Australian dollar remain legal tender.

Shortly after the changeover, substantial counterfeiting of $10 notes was detected. This provided an impetus for the Reserve Bank of Australia to develop new note technologies jointly with the Commonwealth Scientific and Industrial Research Organisation, culminating in the introduction of the first polymer banknote in 1988.

=== First polymer series ===
Australia was the first country to produce polymer banknotes, more specifically made of polypropylene polymer, which were produced by Note Printing Australia. These polymer notes are cleaner than paper notes, are more durable and easily recyclable.

The first polymer banknote was issued in 1988 as a $10 note commemorating the bicentenary of European settlement in Australia. The note depicted on one side a young male Aboriginal person in body paint, with other elements of Aboriginal culture. On the reverse side was the ship Supply from the First Fleet, with a background of Sydney Cove, as well as a group of people to illustrate the diverse backgrounds from which Australia has evolved over 200 years.

The first polymer series was rolled out starting 1992 and featured the following persons:

- The $100 note features world-renowned soprano Dame Nellie Melba (1861–1931), and the distinguished soldier, engineer and administrator General Sir John Monash (1865–1931).
- The $50 note features Aboriginal writer and inventor David Unaipon (1872–1967), and Australia's first female parliamentarian, Edith Cowan (1861–1932).
- The $20 note features the founder of the world's first aerial medical service (the Royal Flying Doctor Service), the Reverend John Flynn (1880–1951), and Mary Reibey (1777–1855), who arrived in Australia as a convict in 1792 and went on to become a successful shipping magnate and philanthropist.
- The $10 note features the poets Banjo Paterson (1864–1941) and Dame Mary Gilmore (1865–1962). This note incorporates micro-printed excerpts of Paterson's and Gilmore's work.
- The $5 note features Queen Elizabeth II and Parliament House, Canberra, the national capital.

A special centenary issue of the $5 note in 2001 featured Sir Henry Parkes and Catherine Helen Spence. In 2015–2016 there were petitions to feature Fred Hollows on the upgraded $5 note, but failed to push through when the new note was introduced on 1 September 2016.

Australia also prints polymer banknotes for a number of other countries through Note Printing Australia, a wholly owned subsidiary of the Reserve Bank of Australia. Note Printing Australia prints polymer notes or simply supplies the polymer substrate for a growing number of other countries including Bangladesh, Brunei, Chile, Kuwait, Malaysia, Mexico, Nepal, New Zealand, Papua New Guinea, Romania, Samoa, Singapore, Solomon Islands, Sri Lanka and Vietnam. Many other countries are showing a strong interest in the new technology.

=== Second polymer series ===
On 27 September 2012, the Reserve Bank of Australia stated that it had ordered work on a project to upgrade the current banknotes. The upgraded banknotes would incorporate a number of new future proof security features and include tactile features like Braille dots for ease of use of the visually impaired. All persons featured on the first polymer series were retained on the second polymer series. However, following the death of Queen Elizabeth II, the government has announced that the $5 note will be replaced with a design reflecting Indigenous history and culture.

Banknote series (since 2016)
Value	Image		Design		Dimensions^{1} (mm)	Weight^{1} (g)	Main colour	Window image	Embossing^{3}	Printed	Issued
Value	Front	Back	Front	Back	Dimensions^{1} (mm)	Weight^{1} (g)	Main colour	Window image	Embossing^{3}	Printed	Issued
$5			Queen Elizabeth II	Parliament House^{4}	130 × 65	unknown	Purple	Top-to-bottom window^{2}	Federation star	Current	1 September 2016
$10			Banjo Paterson	Dame Mary Gilmore	137 × 65	unknown	Blue	Top-to-bottom window	Pen nib	Current	20 September 2017
$20			Mary Reibey	Reverend John Flynn	144 × 65	0.82g	Red	Top-to-bottom window	Compass	Current	9 October 2019
$50			David Unaipon	Edith Cowan	151 × 65	unknown	Yellow	Top-to-bottom window	Book	Current	18 October 2018
$100			Dame Nellie Melba	Sir John Monash	158 × 65	unknown	Green	Top-to-bottom window	Fan	Current	29 October 2020
These images are to scale at 0.7 pixel per millimetre (18 pixel per inch). For table standards, see the banknote specification table. Source: Reserve Bank of Australia.
Remarks: 1. Thickness and weight of notes is ±5 percent with a 1,000-note sample 2. A new clear polymer window that goes from the top to the bottom of the note 3. Embossing is inside the small window.; 4. There are two blocks of micro-text on the reverse side of the Fourth series five dollar note, which contains excerpts of the Constitution of Australia

== Exchange rates ==
=== Exchange rate history ===
The cost of one euro in Australian dollars

Just prior to 1983, Australia maintained a fixed exchange rate. The Australian pound was initially at par from 1910 with the British pound or £A1 = £1 (United Kingdom); from 1931 it was devalued to £A1 = GB£0.80 (16 shillings sterling). This reflected its historical ties as well as a view about the stability in value of the British pound.

From 1946 to 1971, Australia maintained a peg under the Bretton Woods system, a fixed exchange rate system that pegged the U.S. dollar to gold, but the Australian dollar was effectively pegged to sterling until 1967 at £1 sterling = A$2.50 = US$2.80 (A$1 = 8s sterling). In 1967, Australia did not follow the pound sterling devaluation and remained fixed to the U.S. dollar at A$1 = US$1.12 = 9s 4d sterling.

With the breakdown of the Bretton Woods system in 1971, Australia converted the traditional peg to a managed float regime against the US dollar. In September 1974, Australia managed the dollar's exchange rate against a basket of currencies (called the trade weighted index (TWI)) in an effort to reduce the fluctuations associated with its tie to the US dollar. The daily TWI valuation was changed in November 1976 to a periodically adjusted valuation.

The highest valuation of the Australian dollar relative to the U.S. dollar was during the period of the peg to the U.S. dollar. On 9 September 1973, the peg was adjusted to US$1.4875, the fluctuation limits being changed to US$1.485–US$1.490; on both 7 December 1973 and 10 December 1973, the noon buying rate in New York City for cable transfers payable in foreign currencies reached its highest point of 1.4885 U.S. dollars to one dollar.

1983 ABC news report on the first day of trading with a floating dollar

In December 1983, the Australian Labor government led by Prime Minister Bob Hawke and Treasurer Paul Keating ended the managed exchange rate scheme in favour of a floating exchange rate set by supply and demand on international money markets. The decision was made on 8 December 1983 and announced on 9 December 1983.

In the two decades that followed, its highest price relative to the US dollar was US$0.881 in December 1988. The lowest ever price of the Australian dollar after it was floated was 47.75 US cents in April 2001. It returned to above 96 US cents in June 2008, and reached 98.49 later that year. Although the price of the Australian dollar fell significantly from this high towards the end of 2008, it gradually recovered in 2009 to 94 US cents.

On 15 October 2010, the Australian dollar reached parity with the US dollar for the first time since becoming a freely traded currency, trading above US$1 for a few seconds. The currency then traded above parity for a sustained period of several days in November, and fluctuated around that mark into 2011. On 27 July 2011, the dollar hit a record high since floating, at $1.1080 against the US dollar. Some commentators speculated that its high value that year was related to Europe's sovereign debt crisis, and Australia's strong ties with material importers in Asia and in particular China.

Since the end of China's large-scale purchases of Australian commodities in 2013, however, the Australian dollar's price in US dollar terms fell to US$0.88 as of end-2013, and to as low as US$0.57 in March 2020. As of 2024, it has traded at a range of US$0.63 to US$0.68.

=== Determinants of value ===
In 2025, the Australian dollar was the seventh most traded currency in world foreign exchange markets, accounting for 6.1% of the world's daily share (down from 6.4% in 2022) behind the United States dollar, the euro, the Japanese yen, the pound sterling, Renminbi, and Swiss franc.

The Australian dollar is popular with currency traders, because of the comparatively high interest rates in Australia, the relative freedom of the foreign exchange market from government intervention, the general stability of Australia's economy and political system, and the prevailing view that the Australian dollar offers diversification benefits in a portfolio containing the major world currencies, especially because of its greater exposure to Asian economies and the commodities cycle.

Economists posit that commodity prices are the dominant driver of the Australian dollar, and this means changes in exchange rates of the Australian dollar occur in ways opposite to many other currencies. For decades, Australia's balance of trade has depended primarily upon commodity exports such as minerals and agricultural products. This means the Australian dollar varies significantly during the business cycle, rallying during global booms as Australia exports raw materials, and falling during recessions as mineral prices slump or when domestic spending overshadows the export earnings outlook. This movement is in the opposite direction to other reserve currencies, which tend to be stronger during market slumps as traders move value from falling stocks into cash.

The Australian dollar is a reserve currency and one of the most traded currencies in the world. Other factors in its popularity include a relative lack of central bank intervention, and general stability of the Australian economy and government. In January 2011 at the World Economic Forum in Davos, Switzerland, Alexey Ulyukaev announced that the Central Bank of Russia would begin keeping Australian dollar reserves.

Most traded currencies by value Currency distribution of global foreign exchange market turnover
Currency	ISO 4217 code	Proportion of daily volume		Change (2022–2025)
Currency	ISO 4217 code	April 2022	April 2025	Change (2022–2025)
United States dollar	USD	88.4%	89.2%	▲0.8pp
Euro	EUR	30.6%	28.9%	▼1.7pp
Japanese yen	JPY	16.7%	16.8%	▲0.1pp
Pound sterling	GBP	12.9%	10.2%	▼2.7pp
Renminbi	CNY	7.0%	8.5%	▲1.5pp
Swiss franc	CHF	5.2%	6.4%	▲1.2pp
Australian dollar	AUD	6.4%	6.1%	▼0.3pp
Canadian dollar	CAD	6.2%	5.8%	▼0.4pp
Hong Kong dollar	HKD	2.6%	3.8%	▲1.2pp
Singapore dollar	SGD	2.4%	2.4%	Steady
Indian rupee	INR	1.6%	1.9%	▲0.3pp
South Korean won	KRW	1.8%	1.8%	Steady
Swedish krona	SEK	2.2%	1.6%	▼0.6pp
Mexican peso	MXN	1.5%	1.6%	▲0.1pp
New Zealand dollar	NZD	1.7%	1.5%	▼0.2pp
Norwegian krone	NOK	1.7%	1.3%	▼0.4pp
New Taiwan dollar	TWD	1.1%	1.2%	▲0.1pp
Brazilian real	BRL	0.9%	0.9%	Steady
South African rand	ZAR	1.0%	0.8%	▼0.2pp
Polish złoty	PLN	0.7%	0.8%	▲0.1pp
Danish krone	DKK	0.7%	0.7%	Steady
Indonesian rupiah	IDR	0.4%	0.7%	▲0.3pp
Turkish lira	TRY	0.4%	0.5%	▲0.1pp
Thai baht	THB	0.4%	0.5%	▲0.1pp
Israeli new shekel	ILS	0.4%	0.4%	Steady
Hungarian forint	HUF	0.3%	0.4%	▲0.1pp
Czech koruna	CZK	0.4%	0.4%	Steady
Chilean peso	CLP	0.3%	0.3%	Steady
Philippine peso	PHP	0.2%	0.2%	Steady
Colombian peso	COP	0.2%	0.2%	Steady
Malaysian ringgit	MYR	0.2%	0.2%	Steady
UAE dirham	AED	0.4%	0.1%	▼0.3pp
Saudi riyal	SAR	0.2%	0.1%	▼0.1pp
Romanian leu	RON	0.1%	0.1%	Steady
Peruvian sol	PEN	0.1%	0.1%	Steady
Other currencies		2.6%	3.4%	▲0.8pp
Total (Note: The total sum is 200% because each currency trade is counted twice: once for the currency being bought and once for the currency being sold. The percentages above represent the proportion of all trades involving a given currency, regardless of which side of the transaction it is on.)		200.0%	200.0%	

=== Current exchange rates ===
Current AUD exchange rates
From Google Finance:	CAD CHF CNY EUR GBP HKD JPY USD NZD
From Yahoo! Finance:	CAD CHF CNY EUR GBP HKD JPY USD NZD
From XE.com:	CAD CHF CNY EUR GBP HKD JPY USD NZD
From OANDA:	CAD CHF CNY EUR GBP HKD JPY USD NZD

== Legal tender ==
=== Within Australia ===
Australian notes are legal tender throughout Australia by virtue of section 36(1) of the Reserve Bank Act 1959 without an amount limit. Section 16 of the Currency Act 1965 similarly provides that Australian coins intended for general circulation are also legal tender, but only for the following amounts:

- 1c and 2c coins (withdrawn from circulation from February 1992, but still legal tender): for payments not exceeding 20c
- 5c, 10c, 20c and 50c (of any combination): for payments not exceeding $5
- $1 coins: for payments not exceeding $10
- $2 coins: for payments not exceeding $20
- Non-circulating $10 coins: for payments not exceeding $100
- Coins of other denominations: no lower limit

However, being legal tender does not necessarily oblige businesses to accept cash. The Reserve Bank states that businesses can set commercial terms for a transaction that requires the use of a non-cash payment. However, a business may technically be required to accept cash if they are taken to court, but this is usually not a viable option for consumers.

=== Outside Australia ===
Australian notes and coins are also legal tender in the independent sovereign states of Kiribati, Nauru, and Tuvalu. Nauru never had its own currency. Tuvalu and Kiribati additionally had their respective Tuvaluan and Kiribati dollars at par with the Australian dollar. They are legal tender in their respective countries but not in Australia. However, both countries no longer produce coinage since the 1990s and have never produced their own banknotes. As a result, the Australian dollar is the dominant currency in both countries.

Tuvalu also issues non-circulating commemorative bullion coins produced by the Perth Mint.

== See also ==
- Banking in Australia
- Brass razoo
- Coins of Australia
- Economy of Australia
- Note Printing Australia
- Section 51 (xii) of the Constitution of Australia

== Explanatory notes ==
Preceded by: Australian pound Reason: decimalisation Ratio: 2 dollars = 1 pound	Currency of Australia, Christmas Island, Cocos Islands, Norfolk Island, Nauru, Kiribati, Tuvalu; 14 February 1966 –	Succeeded by: Current
Preceded by: New Guinean pound Reason: decimalisation Ratio: 2 dollars = 1 pound	Currency of Papua New Guinea; 14 February 1966 – 1975	Succeeded by: Papua New Guinean kina Reason: currency independence Ratio: at par
Preceded by: Australian pound Reason: decimalisation Ratio: 2 dollars = 1 pound	Currency of Solomon Islands; 14 February 1966 – 1977	Succeeded by: Solomon Islands dollar Reason: currency independence Ratio: at par
