= Australian one-dollar coin =

Current denomination of Australian currency

One Dollar
- Australia
- Value: 1.00 AUD
- Mass: 9.00 g
- Diameter: 25.00 mm
- Thickness: 2.80 mm
- Edge: interrupted milled 0.25 mm 77 notches
- Composition: 92% Copper, 6% Aluminium, 2% Nickel
- Years of minting: 1984–present
- Catalog number: —

Obverse
- Design: Queen Elizabeth II (1984–2023); King Charles III (2023–present)
- Designer: Various (1984–2023); Dan Thorne (2023–present)
- Design date: 2023

Reverse
- Design: Five kangaroos
- Designer: Stuart Devlin
- Design date: 1983

The Australian one-dollar coin is the second most valuable circulation denomination coin of the Australian dollar after the two-dollar coin; there are also non-circulating legal-tender coins of higher denominations (five-, ten-, and two-hundred-dollar coins).

It was first issued on 14 May 1984 to replace the one-dollar note which was then in circulation, although plans to introduce a dollar coin had existed since the mid-1970s. The first year of minting saw 186.3 million of the coins produced at the Royal Australian Mint in Canberra.

Four portraits of Queen Elizabeth II have featured on the obverse, the 1984 head of Queen Elizabeth II by Arnold Machin; between 1985 and 1998, the head by Raphael Maklouf; between 1999 and 2009, the head by Ian Rank-Broadley; and since 2019, the effigy of Elizabeth II by artist Jody Clark has been released into circulation. The coin features an inscription on its obverse of AUSTRALIA on the right-hand side and ELIZABETH II on the left-hand side. One-dollar coins bearing the portrait of King Charles III entered circulation in December 2023.

The reverse features five kangaroos. The image was designed by Stuart Devlin, who designed Australia's first decimal coins in 1966.

The one-dollar denomination was only issued in coin sets in 1987, 1989, 1990, 1991, 1992, and 2012. No one-dollar coin with any mint mark was ever released for circulation; any dollars found with such mark comes for a card.

One-dollar coins are legal tender for amounts not exceeding 10 times the face value of the coin for any payment of a debt.

== Commemorative issue ==
The Royal Australian Mint has released a number of commemorative issued coins since the Australian one-dollar coin was released in 1984, some of which were not released into circulation.

Year	Subject	Mintage
1986	International Year of Peace	25,200,000
1988	Commemoration the Australian Bicentennial	21,600,000
1993	Landcare Australia	18,200,000
1996	Sir Henry Parkes	26,200,000
1997	Birth of Sir Charles Kingsford Smith	24,400,000
1999	International Year of Older Persons	29,300,000
2001	Centenary of Federation	27,900,000
2001	International Year of Volunteers	6,000,000
2002	Year of the Outback	35,400,000
2003	Australia's Volunteers	4,100,000
2003	Centenary of Women's Suffrage	10,000,000
2005	60th Anniversary of the End of World War II	34,200,000
2007	Australia's hosting of the Asia-Pacific Economic Cooperation Forum	20,100,000
2008	Centenary of Scouting in Australia	17,200,000
2009	100th Year of the Age Pension	21,300,000
2010	Centenary of Girl Guiding in Australia	12,600,000
2011	Commonwealth Heads of Government Meeting	9,400,000
2014 – 2018	Centenary of ANZAC 2014–2018	21,900,000 (2014); 1,400,000 (2015); 2,190,000 (2016) 1,900,000 (2017) 2,000,000 (2018)
2016	50th Anniversary of Decimal Currency	560,000
2019	Australia’s Dollar Discovery – 35 years of the Australian $1 coin.	1,513,000 (Letter A) 1,512,000 (Letter U) 1,512,000 (Letter S)
2020	Celebrating a 100 years of Qantas	2,000,000
2020 – 2021	Donation Dollar – the world's first one dollar coin designed to be donated	12,500,000 (2020) 5,000,000 (2021)
2024	Bluey (TV series) – Three coins, one of Bluey Heeler, one of the Heeler family, and one of Bluey and Bingo Heeler dressed as old women/grannies	
2025	Bluey (TV series) – Two coloured coins, both shows Bluey Heeler and Bingo Heeler celebrating an Australian summer Christmas	
2026	"Mob of Six Roos" - 60th anniversary of decimal currency	

== See also ==
- Coins of the Australian dollar

Preceded by One dollar note (Australian)	One dollar (Australian); 1984–present	Succeeded by Present
