= Razuiyeh, Hormozgan =

Razuiyeh رزوئيه
- Village
- Location within Iran
- Coordinates: 27°45′51″N 57°08′20″E
- Country: Iran
- Province: Hormozgan
- County: Rudan
- Bakhsh: Rudkhaneh
- Rural District: Mosaferabad

Population (2006)
  - Total: 305
- Time zone: UTC+3:30 (IRST)
  - Summer (DST): UTC+4:30 (IRDT)

Razuiyeh (Persian: رزوئيه, also Romanized as Razū’īyeh; also known as Razoo) is a village in Mosaferabad Rural District, Rudkhaneh District, Rudan County, Hormozgan Province, Iran. At the 2006 census, its population was 305, in 60 families.
