= Brass razoo =

Australian term

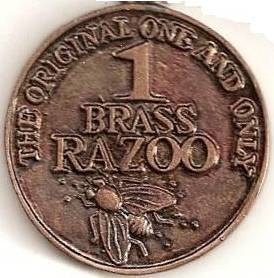
A Brass Razoo

Brass razoo is an Australian phrase that was first recorded in soldiers' slang in World War I. It is defined in the Oxford English Dictionary as "a non-existent coin of trivial value". It is commonly used in the expression I haven't got a brass razoo, meaning the speaker is out of money.

Whilst mock coins of 1 Razoo are occasionally produced, no actual monetary unit has ever been so named. Some speculate that the term arises from Egyptian or Indian currency.

Etymologists and lexicographers have disputed and considered theories of the origins of the phrase, but most find no theory satisfactory.

== Origin ==
Razoo may be a corruption of a sou, the smallest French coin. Brass is a common slang term for 'money'.

Eric Partridge, in his Dictionary of Slang and Unconventional English, cites the Māori word rahu. Harry Orsman's Dictionary of New Zealand English (1997) makes a more confident conjecture.

As The Washington Post reported in December 2007, a Washington, D.C., firm established to facilitate social networking for philanthropy has taken its name from the New Zealand meaning of razoo for a small coin.

Another posited origin is a phrase used by Australian soldiers serving in France, and considered a joking reference used between Australian infantry and American troops. It was based on the Yankee "blowing a raspberry" also called a "razoo", a mouth-sound made to sound like a fart.

== See also ==
- Three-dollar bill
