= Coins of the Australian dollar =

The coins of the Australian dollar were introduced on 14 February 1966, although they did not at that time include the one-dollar or two-dollar coins. The dollar was equivalent in value to 10 shillings (half a pound) in the former currency.

== Regular coinage ==
"Design of the new decimal currency", first broadcast by the ABC in 1964

The Royal Australian Mint has announced that, following the death of Queen Elizabeth II in 2022, it would produce one million $1 coins bearing Charles III’s effigy in 2023 with the new effigy to fully replace a temporary memorial effigy of Queen Elizabeth II by May 2024. All previous Australian coins have featured a depiction of the monarch on the obverse. Since decimalisation, four different effigies of Elizabeth II, Queen of Australia had been used for this purpose. The first effigy was designed by Arnold Machin, the second by Raphael Maklouf, the third by Ian Rank-Broadley and the fourth by artist Jody Clark. They have all been matched with designs by the Australian-born artist Stuart Devlin on the reverse. The set now comprises a 50c, 20c, 10c and 5c coin, all still referred to as "silver", although they consist of 75% copper and 25% nickel. For many years there were also 2c and 1c coins, traditionally called "copper" coins, although they are actually an alloy of copper and zinc.

The "silver" 5c, 10c, and 20c coins can be counted by value using their weight, without the need to count the individual pieces, as they have the same weight per value, at 0.565g per cent, or 56.5g per dollar. This allows banks to count the value of a collection of any combination of those coins.

The original 50c coin was circular and contained 80% silver and 20% copper, and the metal in the coin quickly became worth more than 50c. It had almost identical dimensional specifications to the British half crown coin. However, to avoid confusion with the 20c coin, and because of its excess value, it was only produced for one year and then withdrawn from circulation. No 50-cent coins were minted for 1967 or 1968. The coin was issued in a dodecagonal (12-sided) shape starting in 1969, although the 12-sided version had been minted in 1966–67 as a specimen piece, to test the design. The standard design on both versions of the coin are the same: the obverse carries the effigy of the sovereign, and the reverse shows the coat of arms of Australia, although the coin has been issued with both standard and commemorative designs.

The dodecagonal version has a mass of 15.55 g and a diameter of 31.5 mm, and the round silver version had a mass of 13.28 g and diameter of 31.5 mm. 94.13 round 50c coins make up a fine kilogram of silver.

"Gold" one-dollar and two-dollar coins were introduced in the 1980s. The one-dollar coin was introduced in 1984, to replace the banknote of the same value. The two-dollar coin, also replacing a banknote, was introduced in 1988. They have content of 2% nickel, 6% aluminium and 92% copper. The two-dollar coin is smaller in diameter than the one-dollar coin, but the two-dollar is slightly thicker.

Due to the metal exceeding face value, the minting of one- and two-cent coins was discontinued in 1991, and they were withdrawn from circulation beginning in 1992. Since 1991, both coins have only been minted as collector's items, such as in 2006 as part of a "Mint Year" set. Australian coins have medallic orientation, as do most other Commonwealth coins, Japanese yen coins, and euro coins. That is in contrast to coin orientation, which is used in United States coinage.

After the death of Elizabeth II and the change of its Sovereign, new Australian coins began to be minted with King Charles III on their obverse in December 2023. The $1 coin was the first to change over, with the remaining denominations to be periodically changed based on bank demand.

=== Table ===
Australian coins
Image		Value	Technical parameters				Description			Date of first minting
Obverse	Reverse	Value	Diameter	Thickness	Weight	Composition	Edge	Obverse	Reverse	Date of first minting
		5c	19.41 mm	1.3 mm	2.83 g	Cupronickel; 75% copper 25% nickel	Reeded	Queen; Elizabeth II (1966–2024); King; Charles III (2024–present)	Echidna	1966
		10c	23.60 mm	1.5 mm	5.65 g	Cupronickel; 75% copper 25% nickel	Reeded	Queen; Elizabeth II (1966–2024); King; Charles III (2024–present)	Superb lyrebird	1966
		20c	28.65 mm	2.0 mm	11.3 g	Cupronickel; 75% copper 25% nickel	Reeded	Queen; Elizabeth II (1966–2024); King; Charles III (2024–present)	Platypus	1966
		50c	Dodecagon 31.65 mm (across flats)	2.0 mm	15.55 g	Cupronickel; 75% copper 25% nickel	Plain	Queen; Elizabeth II (1969–2024); King; Charles III (2024–present)	Coat of arms	1969
		$1	25.00 mm	2.8 mm	9.00 g	92% copper 6% aluminium 2% nickel	Interrupted milled	Queen; Elizabeth II (1984–2023); King; Charles III (2023–present)	Five kangaroos	1984
		$2	20.50 mm	3.0 mm	6.60 g	92% copper 6% aluminium 2% nickel	Interrupted milled	Queen; Elizabeth II (1988–2024); King; Charles III (2024–present)	Aboriginal elder and Southern Cross	1988
These images are to scale at 2.5 pixels per millimetre. For table standards, see the coin specification table. Source: Royal Australian Mint.

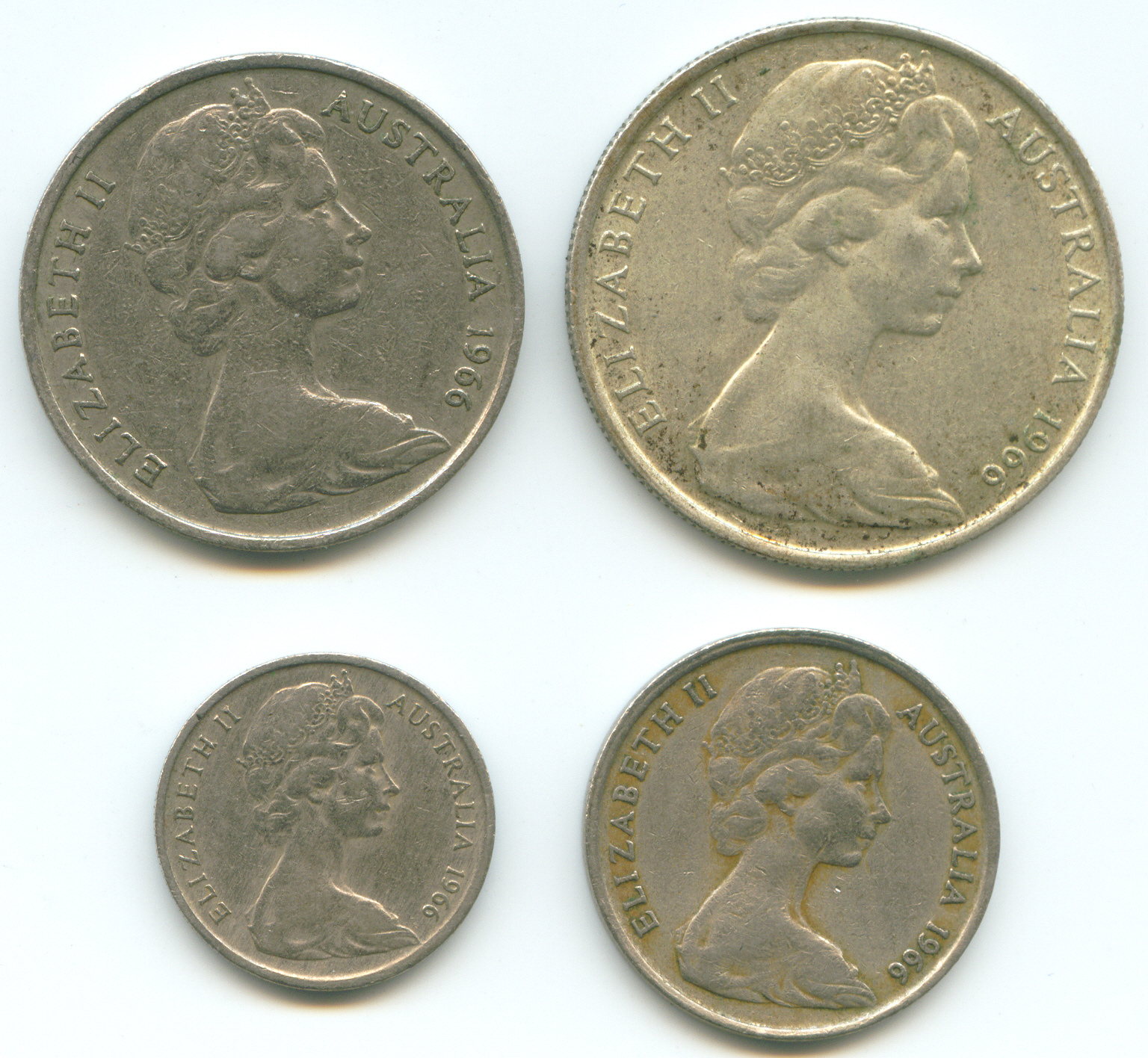
Effigy of Elizabeth II by Arnold Machin displayed on coins minted in 1966

== Commemorative coins ==
Commemorative coins have been produced for various denominations in various years with imagery representing an event replacing the usual design on the reverse side of the coin. In some years, all the coins of that denomination are replaced with a different design for that year. In other cases, only a few million coins have the commemorative design, and coins with the standard reverse are also released.

No commemorative issues of the 1c coin have been produced, and with the exception of the 2016 issue, there have been no commemorative issues of the 5c and 10c coins. A special 2c coin was released, showcasing one of Stuart Devlin's alternative designs. Many commemorative versions of the 50c coin have been placed in general circulation since 1970. The first $1 coin commemorative issue was in 1986, the first 20c commemorative issue in 1995, and the first $2 commemorative issue in 2012. Mintages reported for these coins vary from around 500,000 to around 50 million.

In 1992 the Mint commenced production of commemorative issues which were not for circulation. Mintages reported for these coins vary from around 5,000 to around 125,000, with the notable exception of the four 25c coins of 2016 which have mintages of 1 million each.

In 2016, to celebrate 50 years of decimal currency, a commemorative design for the obverse of the coins was released. To date this is the only issue where the commemorative design is on the obverse face rather than on the reverse face.

== Collectable coins ==
The Royal Australian Mint regularly releases collectable coins, one of the most famous of which is the 1980–1994 gold two-hundred-dollar coin series. Australian collectable coins are all legal tender and can be used directly as currency or converted to "normal" coinage at a bank. Metals include aluminium bronze, silver, gold and bi-metal coins. Nugget coins are issued in troy ounces and fractions or kilograms and come in gold and platinum, some are denominated in dollars, and others by their weight value.

== See also ==
- List of people who have appeared on Australian currency
- Coins of the Canadian dollar
- Coins of the New Zealand dollar
- Swedish rounding

== References and further reading ==
- Australian coins price guide and values - Pre-decimal coins
- Krause, Chester L.; Clifford Mishler (2003). Colin R. Bruce II (ed.). 2004 Standard Catalog of World Coins: 1901–Present (31st ed.). Krause Publications. ISBN 0873495934.
- Pitt, Ian W. (2000), Renniks Australian Coin and Banknote Values (19th ed.), Chippendale, N.S.W.: Renniks Publications, ISBN 978-0-9585574-4-3
- Cruzi's Coins, archived from the original on 22 April 2021
- Australian Commonwealth Coinage, 21 April 2009, archived from the original on 8 December 2013
- Australia's first coins, State Library of NSW, archived from the original on 2 February 2014
- Australian Decimal Currency, archived from the original on 27 December 2012
- about reverse designs, Royal Australian Mint, archived from the original on 11 February 2014
- Internet FAQ, Royal Australian Mint, archived from the original on 5 September 2008
