= Stuart Devlin =

Australian metalsmith (1931–2018)

Stuart Devlin AO CMG
- Born: Stuart Leslie Devlin; 9 October 1931; Geelong, Victoria, Australia
- Died: 12 April 2018 (aged 86); Chichester, West Sussex, England
- Occupations: Goldsmith, silversmith, designer, medallist
- Spouses: Kim Hose (m. 1962); Carole Hedley-Saunders (m. 1986)

Stuart Leslie Devlin AO CMG (9 October 1931 — 12 April 2018) was an Australian artist and metalworker who specialised in gold and silver. He designed coins for countries around the world, and he became especially well known as a London-based designer of collector's items in the 1970s and 1980s.

== Early life and education ==
Devlin was born in Geelong, Victoria, Australia, to Jessie (nee Manly), a housemaid, and Richard, a painter and decorator. After an apprenticeship in ecclesiastical brass, he trained in art education and taught at Wangaratta Technical College between 1951 and 1955, specialising in gold- and silversmithing. In 1957, he obtained a post at the Royal Melbourne Institute of Technology and studied for a Diploma of Art in gold and silversmithing. He was awarded scholarships to study at the Royal College of Art in London in 1958, and he was awarded a Harkness Fellowship by the Commonwealth Fund. He spent the two-year fellowship at Columbia University in New York City where he met and married his first wife, Kim Hose, in 1962.

== Career ==
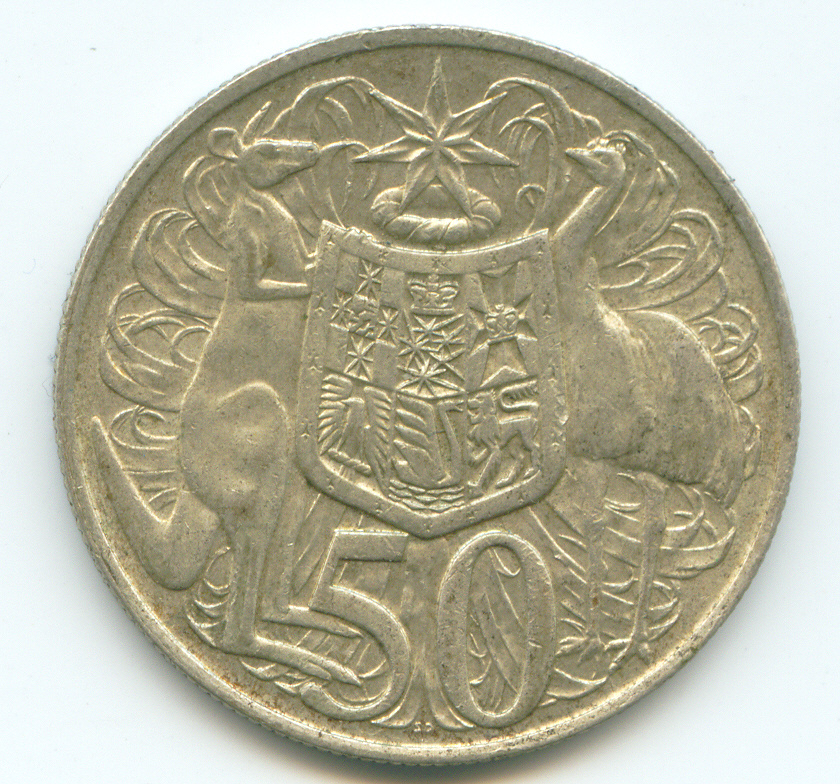
Devlin's initials are located at the bottom of the reverse of the 1966 Australian 50-cent coin.

Devlin returned to teach in Melbourne and subsequently became an inspector of art schools. He rose to fame when, in 1964, he won a competition to design the first decimal coinage for Australia.

In 1965, he moved to London and opened a small workshop. This marked the beginning of Devlin's own style, which often took the form of limited editions, the most popular being Easter eggs and Christmas boxes, now collector's items. He adapted and devised new techniques to produce a wide variety of textures and filigree forms, and became well known in London's West End, producing a new collection each year and employed 60 craftsmen at the height of his career. He had a prestigious showroom in Conduit Street from 1979 until 1985.

In 1966, a Stuart Devlin fine silver sculpture was commissioned by Ford of Britain to celebrate the release of the new Mk IV Ford Zephyr and Zodiac range of motor vehicles.

He designed furniture, interiors, jewellery, and commissioned pieces of all types, including trophies, clocks, centrepieces, goblets, candelabra, bowls, and insignia. Among his most popular commissions, Devlin designed coins and medals for 36 countries throughout the world, including precious coins for the Sydney 2000 Olympic Games and the medals for the founding awards of the Australian honours system in 1975: the Order of Australia, the Australian Bravery Decorations and the National Medal.

In 1982, Devlin was granted the Royal Warrant of Appointment as Goldsmith and Jeweller to Her Majesty the Queen. He married his second wife, Carole Hedley-Saunders, in 1986. He was Prime Warden of the Goldsmith's Company 1996–97. After he stepped down from that role, he continued to work with the Goldsmiths, and particularly involved in the developing of a new institute for future Goldsmiths, and also with various other aspects which involve opportunities for up-and-coming jewellers and goldsmiths, including a summer school and "getting started" course.

== Retirement ==
Having closed his London workshop, Devlin retired to Littlehampton in West Sussex. In his Littlehampton studio, he was one of the first artists to use computer-aided design. By 1992, he purchased an Intergraph workstation running I/Design 3D solid modelling software to design finely detailed jewellery in 3D with photorealistic animations and output to a 3D printer. He had not yet retired. He ceased drawing after he suffered a stroke in 2014.

Devlin died on 12 April 2018 at the age of 86.

== Honours ==
- 1980: Devlin was appointed a Companion of the Order of St Michael and St George in the 1980 Birthday Honours for Services to Design.
- 1982: appointed Goldsmith and Jeweller to Queen Elizabeth II.
- 1988: Officer of the Order of Australia in the 1988 Australia Day Honours in recognition of service to the craftsmanship as a goldsmith, silversmith and designer.
- 1996–97: appointed Prime Warden of the Goldsmiths' Company in London, the first creative goldsmith in that role since its first Royal Charter in 1327.
- 2000: Honorary Doctorate RMIT University Australia for his work in design and education
- 2009: RMIT Alumnus of the year
- 2009: Lifetime Achievement Award of the Goldsmiths' Craft and Design Council, London
- 2011: Australian of the Year in the U.K. by the Australia Day Foundation
