= Royal Australian Mint =

Coordinates: 35.3188°S 149.0929°E

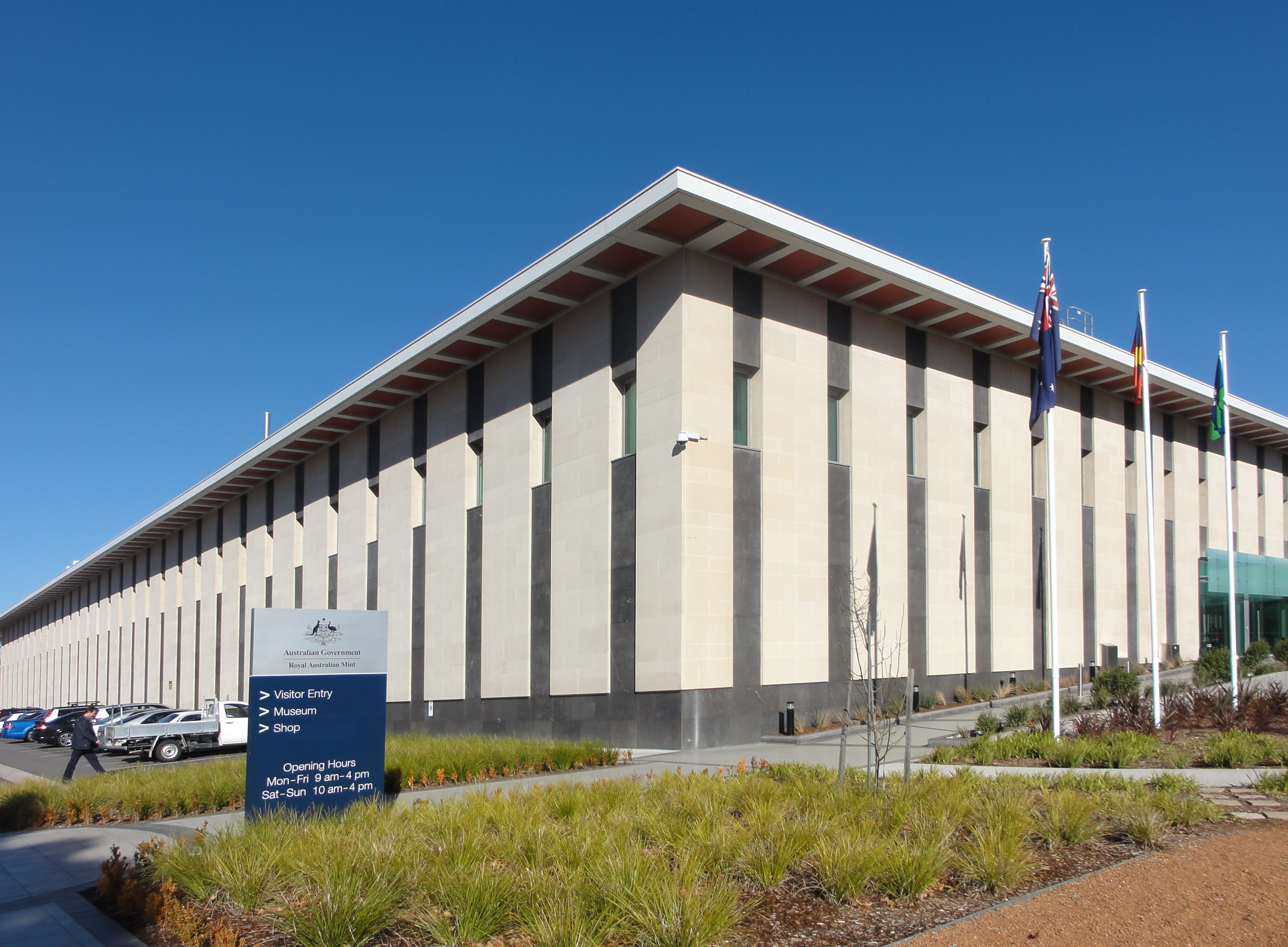

General information
- Location: Deakin, Australian Capital Territory
- Opened: 22 February 1965
- Owner: Australian Government

Design and construction
- Architect: Richard Ure
- Architecture firm: Department of Works
- Main contractor: Civil and Civic; E. S. Clementson Pty Ltd

Website
- https://www.ramint.gov.au/

The Royal Australian Mint is the national mint of Australia, and the primary production facility for the country’s circulating coins. The mint is a Commonwealth Government entity operating within the portfolio of the Treasury, and is situated in the Australian capital city of Canberra, in the suburb of Deakin. The current facility was opened in 1965 by Prince Philip, Duke of Edinburgh.

Before the opening of the Australian Mint, Australian coins were struck at the Sydney Mint, Melbourne Mint and Perth Mint. As such, the Royal Australian Mint was the first mint in Australia to be independent of the British Royal Mint, in the United Kingdom, which was a British government entity. (Of the three older Australian mints, only Perth Mint has remained; it was a subsidiary of the UK Royal Mint until 1970.)

== Foundations and history ==
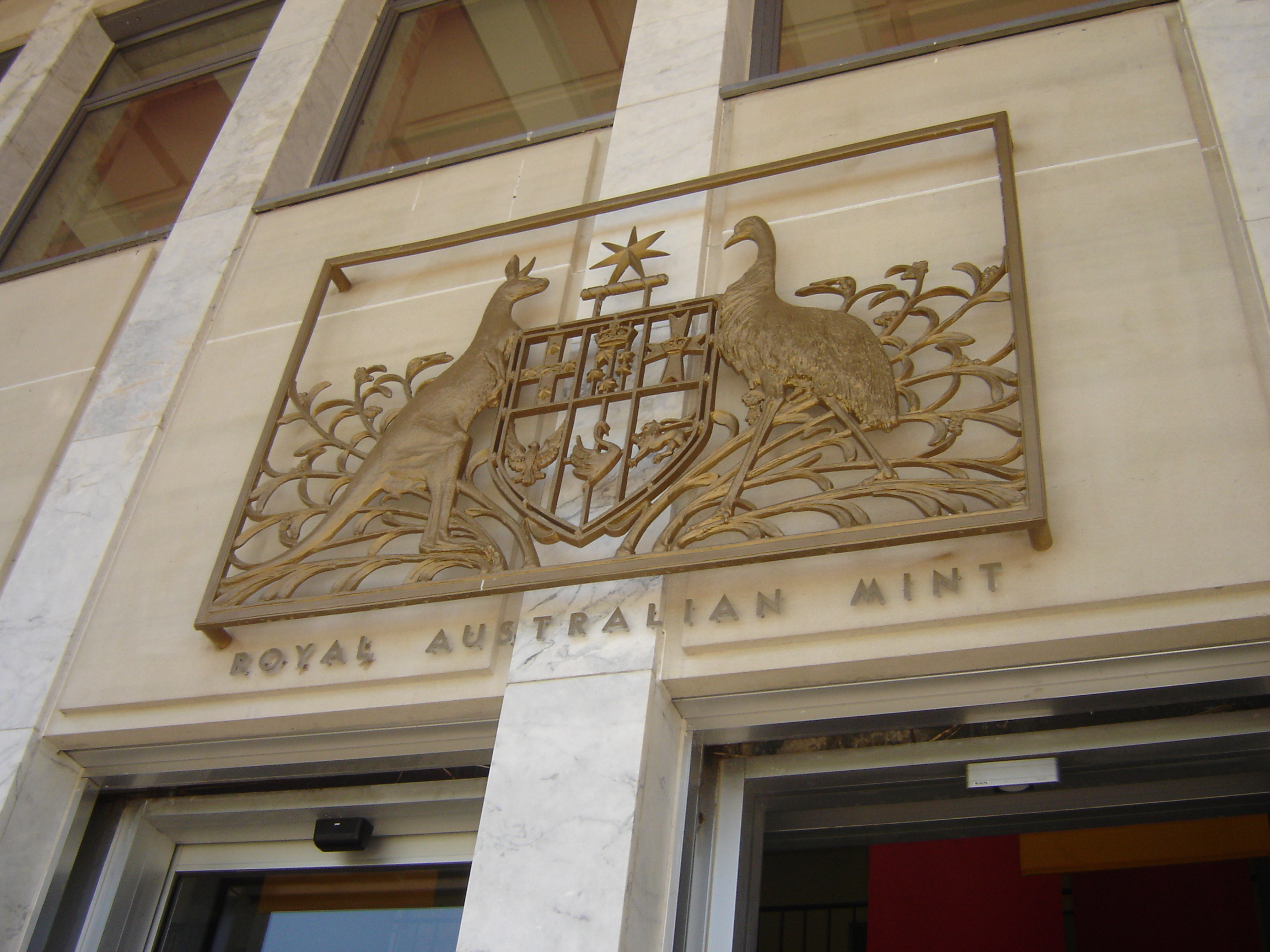
The gold coat of arms of Australia is featured above the entrance to the Royal Australian Mint. It was produced by E. S. Clementson Pty Ltd for £500.

Planning for the mint started in 1959 when it was proposed to move the Melbourne branch of the Royal Mint to Canberra, with a large site in the Canberra suburb of Deakin chosen. The Chief Designing Architect in the Commonwealth Department of Works, Richard Ure, was responsible for the International style design of the mint. It was officially opened by The Duke of Edinburgh on 22 February 1965, coinciding with the introduction of the Australian decimal currency on 14 February 1966. The mint project cost $4.5 million, with Prime Minister Harold Holt noting at the official opening: "We believe that, not only have we achieved a gracious and dignified building in a national setting, but we have a mint also which incorporates the best equipment and most modern minting techniques." The main administration building was constructed by Civil and Civic, while the process building was completed by E. S. Clementson Pty Ltd.

The new mint and the Melbourne Mint operated concurrently while sufficient stockpiles of new coinage were prepared and until it was felt that production in Canberra was proceeding smoothly, after which in 1967 the Melbourne mint was closed. Some staff from the Melbourne mint relocated to Canberra to operate the new mint. However, it was not until the early 1980s that the RAM was able to sustain solitary production of the full set of circulating Australian coins, and so on several occasions in the 1960s and 1970s the RAM contracted production runs to the Perth Mint, the Royal Mint in both London and Llantrisant, and even on one occasion the Royal Canadian Mint.

The mint consists of two buildings, an administration building, and a process building. The administration building houses the engravers, a laboratory, and a vibration-free basement where coinage is measured to ensure correct size and weight.

The mint is an Australian Public Service agency, staffed through the Department of the Treasury.

During 1984-1986, renovations were carried out to support the increasing demand for the production of collector coins, and also to improve the visitor facilities. Visitors can mint their own legal tender coin using visitor presses.

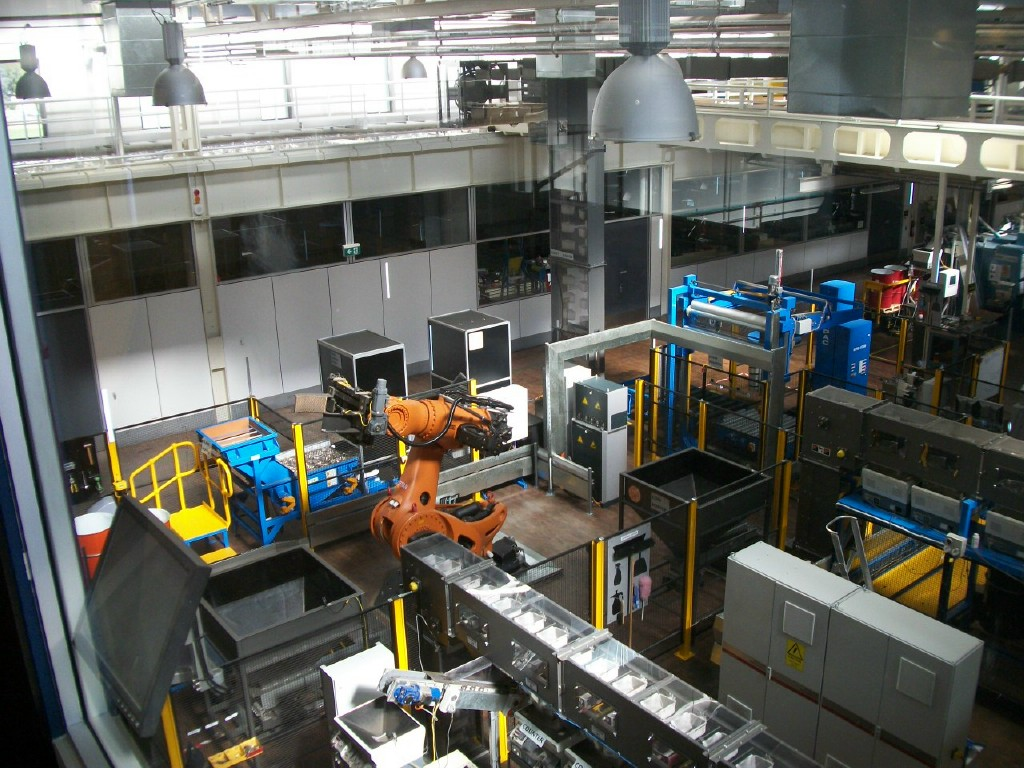
A robot at the mint.

The mint serves primarily to manufacture Australia's legal tender precious metal coins. Notes are produced by Note Printing Australia in Melbourne. The mint also produces medals for military and civilian honours, most notably the Order of Australia. The mint produced medals for the 2000 Summer Olympics in conjunction with the Perth Mint. The Royal Australian Mint also produces tokens made for commercial organisations such as casinos, car washes etc.

Since its opening, the mint has produced over fifteen billion coins and has the capacity to produce two million coins per day. Coins have also been struck for several Asian and South Pacific nations, including New Zealand (in 1969), Papua New Guinea, Tonga, Western Samoa, the Cook Islands, Fiji, Malaysia, Thailand, Nepal, Estonia, Bangladesh, Israel, and the Philippines.

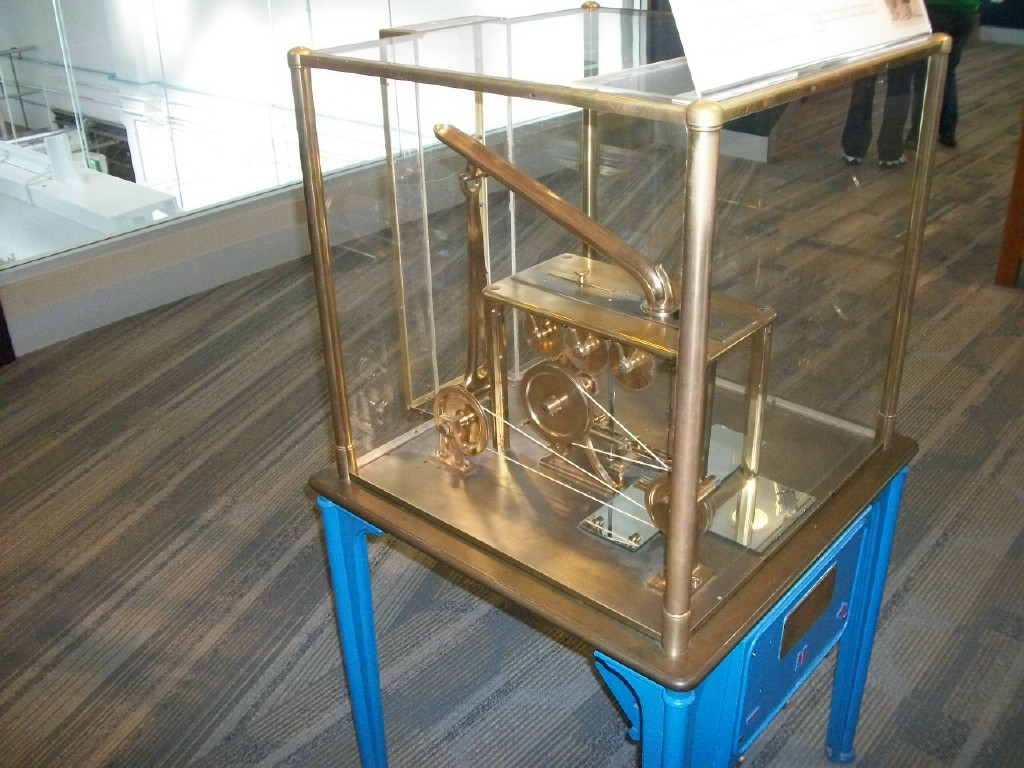
One of many displays at the mint.

In November 2001, the mint issued the world's first coin with a double hologram, to commemorate the centenary of Australian federation. The mint also creates bi-metallic coins, and colour printed coins.

On 11 December 2005, the Joint Standing Committee on Public Works tabled a report recommending the refurbishment of the Royal Australian Mint with a projected cost of A$41.2 million. Work was planned to commence in October 2006 with completion dates of June 2008 for the process building, and April 2009 for the administration building.

The refurbishment also planned to introduce industrial robots to the manufacturing process. The work was completed in 2009, and the mint is now open to the public.

In 2014, the Abbott government announced a scoping study into selling the Royal Australian Mint.

== Chief executives ==
#	Officeholder	Title	Term start date	Term end date	Time in office	Notes
1	James Miller Henderson ISO	Controller	1966	5 November 1971		
2	Ronald Harold Osbourne MBE	Controller	5 November 1971	26 March 1974	2 years, 141 days	
3	John Joslin	Controller	18 April 1974	6 November 1987	13 years, 202 days	
4	Walter Sheehan	Controller	6 November 1987	1 June 1991	3 years, 207 days	
–	Chris Mills (Acting)	Controller	1 June 1991	27 May 1993	1 year, 360 days	
5	Glenys Roper	Controller	27 May 1993	1 March 1998	4 years, 278 days	
6	Graeme Moffatt	Controller	1 March 1998	June 2002		
7	Vivienne Thom	Controller	June 2002	1 March 2006		
8	Janine Murphy	Chief Executive Officer	1 March 2006	5 September 2009	3 years, 188 days	
9	Ross MacDiarmid	Chief Executive Officer	7 June 2010	4 December 2020	10 years, 180 days	
10	Leigh Gordon AO CSM	Chief Executive Officer	1 February 2021	Incumbent	5 years, 288 days	

== See also ==
- List of mints
