= Banknotes of the Australian pound =

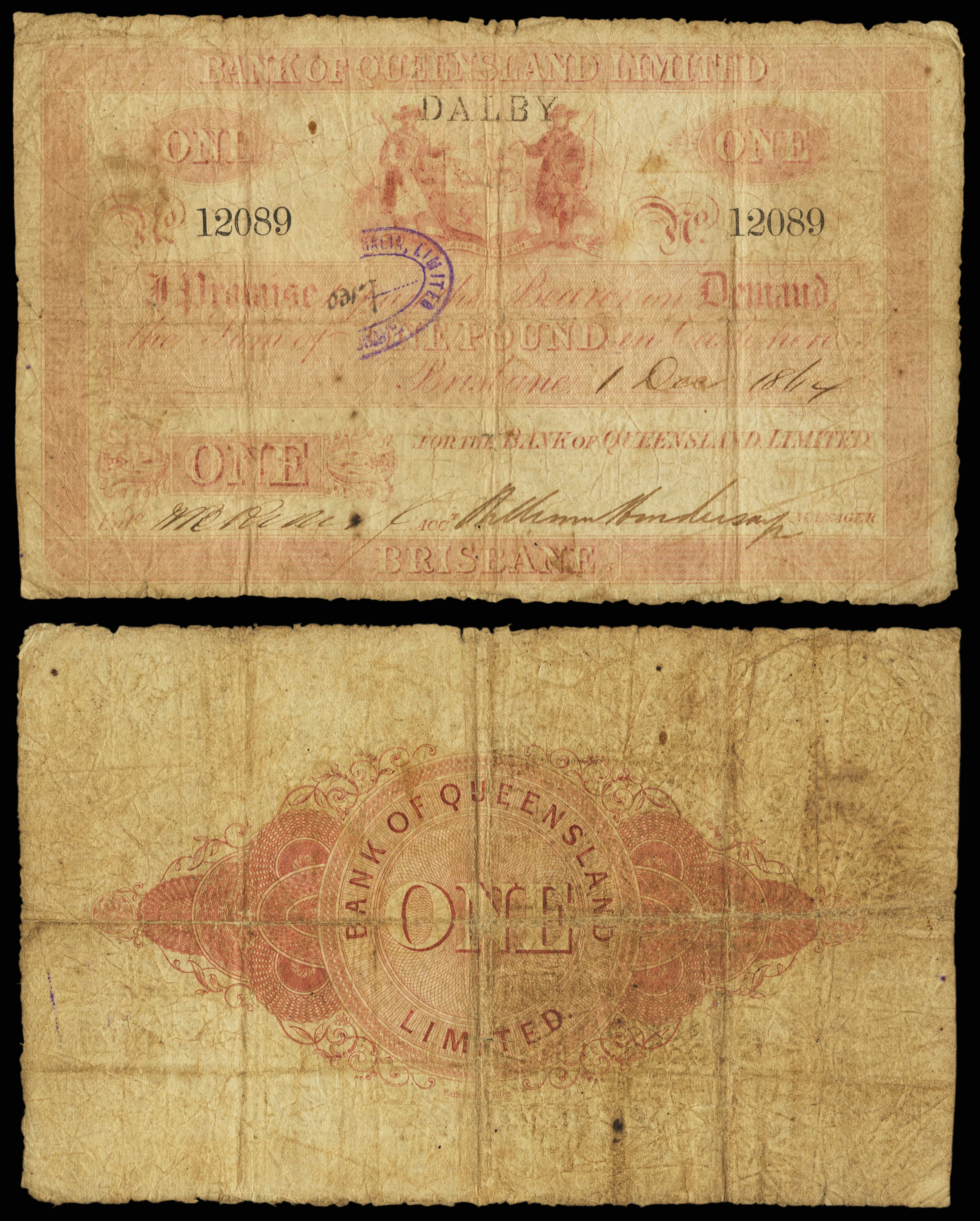
An issued Bank of Queensland £1 note (1864)

Banknotes of the Australian pound were first issued by numerous private banks in Australia, starting with the Bank of New South Wales in 1817. (Note: This article is a split-off from Australian pound. The opening text was initially copied verbatim from the Banknotes section of the article.) Acceptance of private bank notes was not made compulsory by legal tender laws but they were widely used and accepted. The Queensland government issued treasury notes (1866–1869) and banknotes (1893–1910), which were legal tender in Queensland. The New South Wales government issued a limited series of Treasury Notes in 1893.

In 1910, the Commonwealth passed the Australian Notes Act 1910 to initiate banking and currency reform. The act stipulated that six months after the date of passage (16 September 1910), private banks could no longer issue any form of money, and that any note or instrument issued by a state bank would no longer be considered legal tender. The act further established the powers of the Commonwealth to issue, re-issue, and cancel Australian notes. The act also established denominations, legal tender status, and the amount of gold coin held in reserve to secure the issues. On 10 October 1910 (prior to the effective date of the Notes Act), a Bank Notes Tax Act 1910 imposed a "Ten pounds per centum" tax on all issued or re-issued bank notes. A third currency reform act was passed on 22 December 1911 establishing the Commonwealth Bank. The Commonwealth Bank Act 1911 specifically stated that the bank was not to issue bills or notes for circulation. The Australian Treasury issued banknotes until the Commonwealth Bank Act 1920 amended the Commonwealth Bank Act 1911. The amendment established a note-issuing department within the bank which assumed those responsibilities previously held by the Treasury.

On 14 February 1966 the Australian pound was replaced by a decimal currency, the Australian dollar, which was divided into one hundred cents.

== Superscribed banknotes (1910–1914) ==
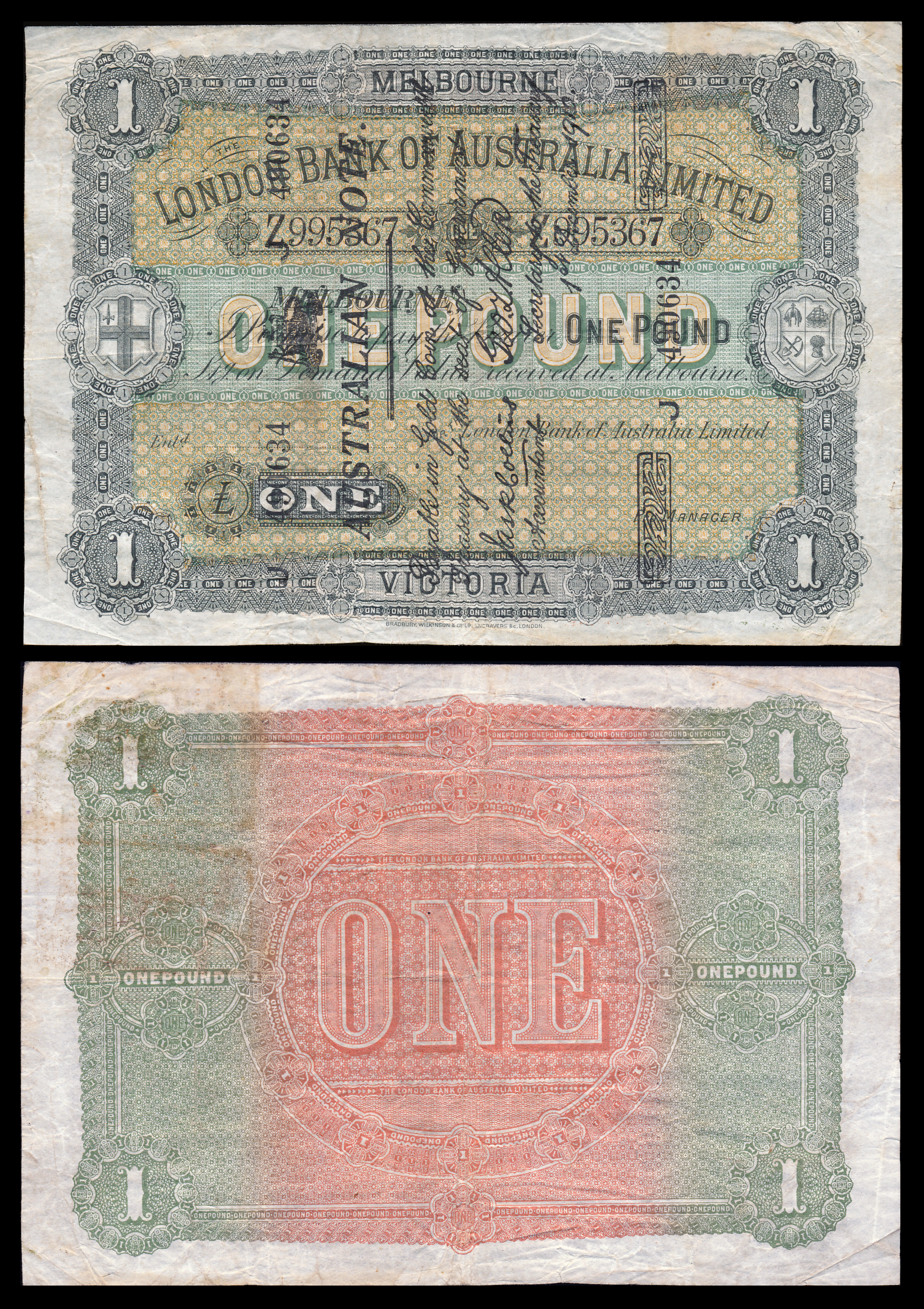
A superscribed note from the London Bank of Australia Limited

The first national issue of paper money (known as Superscribed banknotes) consisted of overprinted notes from fifteen private banks and the Queensland government, issued between 1910 and 1914 in denominations of £1, £5, £10, £20, £50 and £100. The notes, purchased by the Australian government from the remaining private bank stock, were overprinted with the words "Australian note". Surviving notes above the £10 denomination are extremely rare: two £20 notes are known (privately held), £50 notes are known in the collections of the Reserve Bank of Australia and the Art Gallery of South Australia, and no £100 banknotes of this series are known to exist.

Superscribed banknote issuers (1910–14)
Bank Charter (in operation)	Location	Branches	Issue	In operation
Australian Bank of Commerce Limited	Sydney, NSW	Brisbane, Sydney	1,5,10,50	1910–31
Bank of Adelaide	Adelaide, SA	Adelaide	1,5,10,20,50	1865–1980
Bank of Australasia	London, England	Brisbane, Hobart, Melbourne, Perth, Sydney	1,5,10,50,100	1835–1951
Bank of New South Wales	Sydney, NSW	Adelaide, Melbourne, Perth, Sydney	1,5,10,20,50,100	1817–1982
Bank of Victoria Limited	Melbourne, Victoria	Melbourne	1,5,10,20,50	1852–1927
City Bank of Sydney	Sydney, NSW	Sydney	1,5,10,20,50	1864–1918
Colonial Bank of Australasia	Melbourne, Victoria			1856–1918
Commercial Bank of Australia Limited	Melbourne, Victoria	Hobart, Perth	1,5	1866–1982
Commercial Bank of Tasmania Limited	Hobart, Tasmania	Hobart, Launceston	1,5,10,20	1829–1921
Commercial Banking Company of Sydney Limited	Sydney, NSW	Sydney	1,5,10	1834–1982
English Scottish and Australian Bank Limited	London, England	Adelaide, Melbourne, Sydney	1,5,10,20,50	1852–1970
London Bank of Australia Limited	London, England	Adelaide, Melbourne, Sydney	1,5,10,50,100	1852–1921
National Bank of Australasia Limited	Melbourne, Victoria	Adelaide, Melbourne, Perth, Sydney	1,5,10,20,50,100	1858–1982
Queensland Government	Brisbane, Queensland	Brisbane	1,5	1893–1910
Royal Bank of Australia Limited	London, England	Melbourne, Sydney	1	1888–1927
Union Bank of Australia Limited	London, England	Adelaide, Hobart, Melbourne, Perth, Sydney	1,5,10,20,50	1837–1951
Western Australian Bank	Perth, WA	Perth	1,5,10	1841–1927

== Commonwealth banknotes of the Australian pound ==
In 1913 the first national banknotes were introduced in denominations of 10s, £1, £5, and £10. 1914 saw the introduction of £20, £50, £100, and £1,000 notes. The £1,000 note only saw limited circulation and was later confined to inter-bank use. Stocks were destroyed in 1969 and there are no uncancelled examples of this note known to exist in private hands, though a single cancelled example sold in a 2007 auction for AU$1,200,000.

Design alterations were introduced fairly quickly. Beginning in 1915, 10s notes included a red "Half Sovereign" overprint. Banknote size was reduced for the £1 (1923), £5 (1924), and £10 (1925). A portrait of King George V was introduced in the mid-1920s on the 10s through £10 notes. These notes still referred to the currency's convertibility to gold on demand. A newer £1,000 note (1923–1928) with the profile of George V was also prepared but never issued. A punch-cancelled specimen note was discovered in London in 1996 and subsequently sold for a sum in excess of $200,000. Nonetheless, this note is not recognised as a legitimate Australian banknote issue.

Just after the start of the Great Depression in 1933, Australian currency ceased to be redeemable for gold at the previously maintained rate of one gold sovereign for one pound currency. Subsequently, a new series of legal tender notes were designed, once again bearing the portrait of King George V, in denominations of 10s, £1, £5 and £10. These denominations and designs were maintained and modified to accommodate the portrait of King George VI in 1938. For both issues £50 and £100 specimens were prepared, but were not issued.

=== Issuance of the Australian pound banknote (1913–1965) ===
Issuance of the Australian pound banknote (1913–1965)
Issue	Value (Dates)	Banknote	Varieties	Images Size
1913 First Issue	5 Shillings c. 1916		Cerutty and Collins (printed, not issued)	O:George V
1913 First Issue	10 Shillings 1913		Collins and Allen (1913)	O:Arms; R:Goulburn Weir; 194 mm × 83 mm (7.6 in × 3.3 in)
1913 First Issue	1 Pound 1913		Collins and Allen	O:Crowned arms, blue with multicolour underprint R:Gold miners underground 184 mm × 92 mm (7.2 in × 3.6 in)
1913 First Issue	1 Pound (1894) 1914–15		Collins and Allen; Emergency issue superscribed note.	O:Allegory of woman with anchor 182 mm × 118 mm (7.2 in × 4.6 in)
1913 First Issue	1 Pound 1914–15		Collins and Allen; Emergency issue note	O:Black text on multicolour underprint R:Contemporary inscription 184 mm × 102 mm (7.2 in × 4.0 in)
1913 First Issue	1,000 Pounds 1914–24		Collins and Allen; Kell and Collins (1925)	O:Arms; R:Merino sheep in Bungaree; 215 mm × 143 mm (8.5 in × 5.6 in)
1913 Second Issue	10 Shillings 1915–18		Collins and Allen (1915); Cerutty and Collins (1918)	O:Arms, blue text multicolour underprint, "Half Sovereign" red overprint R:Goulburn Weir; 197 mm × 88 mm (7.8 in × 3.5 in)
1913 Second Issue	1 Pound 1913–18		Collins and Allen (1914); Cerutty and Collins (1918)	O:Crowned arms, blue with multicolour underprint R:Gold miners underground 184 mm × 92 mm (7.2 in × 3.6 in)
1913 Second Issue	5 Pounds 1913–18		Collins and Allen; Cerutty and Collins (1918) (Note: These specimen notes (Treasury Issue) are perforation-cancelled and have black diagonal lines across the front and back. A single specimen note of this type appeared in auction in 2003 and is valued to be a six-figure (USD) banknote.)	O:Arms, blue with multicolour underprint R:Hawkesbury River landscape 167 mm × 105 mm (6.6 in × 4.1 in)
1913 Second Issue	10 Pounds 1913–18		Collins and Allen; Cerutty and Collins (1918)	O:Arms, blue with multicolour underprint R:Wagons with bags of grain at Narwonah railway station 165 mm × 102 mm (6.5 in × 4.0 in) (Note: Size variation up to +6mm in length.)
1913 Second Issue	20 Pounds 1914–18		Collins and Allen; Cerutty and Collins (1918)	O:Arms, blue with multicolour underprint R:Lumberjacks at Bruny Island; 165 mm × 98 mm (6.5 in × 3.9 in) (Note: Size variation up to +4 mm in length and/or width.)
1913 Second Issue	50 Pounds 1914–18		Collins and Allen; Cerutty and Collins (1920) (Note: The 50 and 100-pound specimen notes with diagonal red overprint of the word "SPECIMEN" are unlisted in Renniks.)	O:Arms, blue with multicolour underprint R:Merino sheep, Bungaree; 166 mm × 102 mm (6.5 in × 4.0 in) (Note: Size variation up to +2 mm in length.)
1913 Second Issue	100 Pounds 1914–18		Collins and Allen; Cerutty and Collins (1924)	O:Arms, blue with multicolour underprint R:Leura Falls, Upper Yarra River; 168 mm × 102 mm (6.6 in × 4.0 in) (Note: Size variation up to +2 mm in length and/or width.)
1923–25 Issue	Half Sovereign 1923		Miller and Collins (1923) (Note: These specimen notes (Harrison Issue) are perforation-cancelled, have black diagonal lines across the front and back, and two large punch holes on the front left side. A single specimen note of this type appeared in auction and is valued to be a six-figure (USD) banknote.)	O:George V, brown with multicolour underprint, Half Sovereign overprint R:Goulburn Weir; 180 mm × 78 mm (7.1 in × 3.1 in)
1923–25 Issue	1 Pound 1923		Miller and Collins	O:George V, olive-green with multicolor underprint R:Cook's landing at Botany Bay; 180 mm × 78 mm (7.1 in × 3.1 in)
1923–25 Issue	5 Pounds 1924–27		Kell and Collins (1924); Kell and Heathershaw (1927)	O:George V, blue with multicolour underprint R:Hawkesbury River landscape 180 mm × 78 mm (7.1 in × 3.1 in)
1923–25 Issue	10 Pounds 1925		Kell and Collins (specimen only)	O:George V, red with multicolour underprint R:Wagons with bags of grain 180 mm × 78 mm (7.1 in × 3.1 in)
1926–27 Issue	Half Sovereign 1926–33		Kell and Collins (1926); Kell and Heathershaw (1927); Riddle and Heathershaw (1928); Riddle and Sheehan (1933)	O:George V, brown with multicolour underprint, Half Sovereign overprint R:Goulburn Weir; 180 mm × 78 mm (7.1 in × 3.1 in)
1926–27 Issue	1 Pound 1926–32		Kell and Collins (1926); Kell and Heathershaw (1927); Riddle and Heathershaw (1927); Riddle and Sheehan (1932)	O:George V, olive-green with multicolor underprint R:Cook's landing at Botany Bay; 180 mm × 78 mm (7.1 in × 3.1 in)
1926–27 Issue	5 Pounds 1927–32		Riddle and Heathershaw (1927); Riddle and Sheehan (1932)	O:George V, blue with multicolour underprint R:Hawkesbury River landscape 180 mm × 78 mm (7.1 in × 3.1 in)
1926–27 Issue	10 Pounds 1925–33		Kell and Collins (1925); Riddle and Heathershaw (1925); Riddle and Sheehan (1933)	O:George V, red with multicolour underprint R:wagons with bags of grain at Narwonah railway station 180 mm × 77 mm (7.1 in × 3.0 in)
1933–34 Issue	10 Shillings 1933		Riddle and Sheehan (1933)	O:George V, brown with multicolour underprint R:manufacturing allegory WM:Edward VIII as Prince of Wales; 155 mm × 81 mm (6.1 in × 3.2 in)
1933–34 Issue	10 Shillings 1934		Riddle and Sheehan (1934)	O:George V, brown with multicolour underprint, overprint Ten Shillings; R:manufacturing allegory WM:Edward VIII as Prince of Wales; 155 mm × 81 mm (6.1 in × 3.2 in)
1933–34 Issue	10 Shillings 1936–39		Riddle and Sheehan (1936)	O:George V, orange with multicolour underprint, overprint Ten Shillings; R:manufacturing allegory WM:Edward VIII as Prince of Wales, size reduced 137 mm × 76 mm (5.4 in × 3.0 in)
1933–34 Issue	1 Pound 1933–38		Riddle and Sheehan	O:George V, green with multicolour underprint R:shepherds with sheep WM:Edward VIII as Prince of Wales; 155 mm × 79 mm (6.1 in × 3.1 in)
1933–34 Issue	5 Pounds 1933–39		Riddle and Sheehan	O:George V, blue with multicolour underprint R:dock workers with barrels and sacks WM:Edward VIII as Prince of Wales; 181 mm × 79 mm (7.1 in × 3.1 in)
1933–34 Issue	10 Pounds 1934–39		Riddle and Sheehan	O:George V, red with multicolour underprint R:allegory of agriculture WM:Edward VIII as Prince of Wales; 181 mm × 79 mm (7.1 in × 3.1 in)
1938–40 Issue	5 Shillings 1946		Armitage and McFarlane (not Issued)	O:George VI, black with red-brown underprint R:Australian crown coin
1938–40 Issue	10 Shillings 1939–54		Sheehan and McFarlane (1939); Armitage and McFarlane (1942); Coombs and Watt (1949); Coombs and Wilson (1952)	O:George VI, orange with multicolour underprint R:allegory of manufacturers WM:Captain James Cook; 137 mm × 76 mm (5.4 in × 3.0 in)
1938–40 Issue	1 Pound 1938–52		Sheehan and McFarlane (1938); Armitage and McFarlane (1942); Coombs and Watt (1949); Coombs and Wilson (1952)	O:George VI, green with multicolour underprint R:shepherds with sheep WM:Captain James Cook; 155 mm × 79 mm (6.1 in × 3.1 in)
1938–40 Issue	5 Pounds 1939–52		Sheehan and McFarlane (1939); Armitage and McFarlane (1941); Coombs and Watt (1949); Coombs and Wilson (1952)	O:George VI, blue with multicolour underprint R:dock workers with barrels and sacks WM:Captain James Cook; 181 mm × 79 mm (7.1 in × 3.1 in)
1938–40 Issue	10 Pounds 1940–52		Sheehan and McFarlane (1940); Armitage and McFarlane(1943); Coombs and Watt (1949); Coombs and Wilson (1952)	O:George VI, red with multicolour underprint R:allegory of agriculture WM:Captain James Cook; 181 mm × 79 mm (7.1 in × 3.1 in)
1938–40 Issue	50 Pounds 1939		Sheehan and McFarlane specimen only, not issued	O:George VI, purple with multicolour underprint WM:Captain James Cook
1938–40 Issue	100 Pounds 1939		Sheehan and McFarlane specimen only, not issued	O:George VI, brown with multicolour underprint WM:Captain James Cook (suspected)
1953–54 Issue	10 Shillings 1954–66		Coombs and Wilson (1954); Coombs and Wilson (1961)	O:Matthew Flinders, arms, brown with multicolour underprint R:Old Parliament House; WM:Captain James Cook; 137 mm × 76 mm (5.4 in × 3.0 in)
1953–54 Issue	1 Pound 1954–60		Coombs and Wilson	O:Elizabeth II, arms, green with multicolour underprint R:Charles Sturt and Hamilton Hume; WM:Captain James Cook; 156 mm × 81 mm (6.1 in × 3.2 in)
1953–54 Issue	5 Pounds 1954–59		Coombs and Wilson	O:Sir John Franklin, arms, blue on multicolour underprint R:bull and cow's head, sheep WM:Captain James Cook; 167 mm × 79 mm (6.6 in × 3.1 in)
1953–54 Issue	10 Pounds 1954–59		Coombs and Wilson	O:Gov. Arthur Phillip, arms, red and black with multicolour underprint R:allegory of woman with compass, science and industry 181 mm × 79 mm (7.1 in × 3.1 in)
1960–61 Issue	5 Pounds 1960–65		Coombs and Wilson	O: Sir John Franklin, arms, black on blue underprint R:bull and cow's head, sheep WM:Captain James Cook; 167 mm × 79 mm (6.6 in × 3.1 in)
1960–61 Issue	10 Pounds 1960–65		Coombs and Wilson	O:Gov. Arthur Phillip, arms, black with red underprint R:allegory of woman with compass, science and industry WM:Captain James Cook; 181 mm × 79 mm (7.1 in × 3.1 in)
