= Australian one-pound note =

One Pound
- Country: Australia
- Value: 1 Australian pounds
- Width: 156 mm
- Height: 81 mm
- Security features: Thread Watermark
- Material used: Cotton
- Years of printing: 1910–1965

Obverse
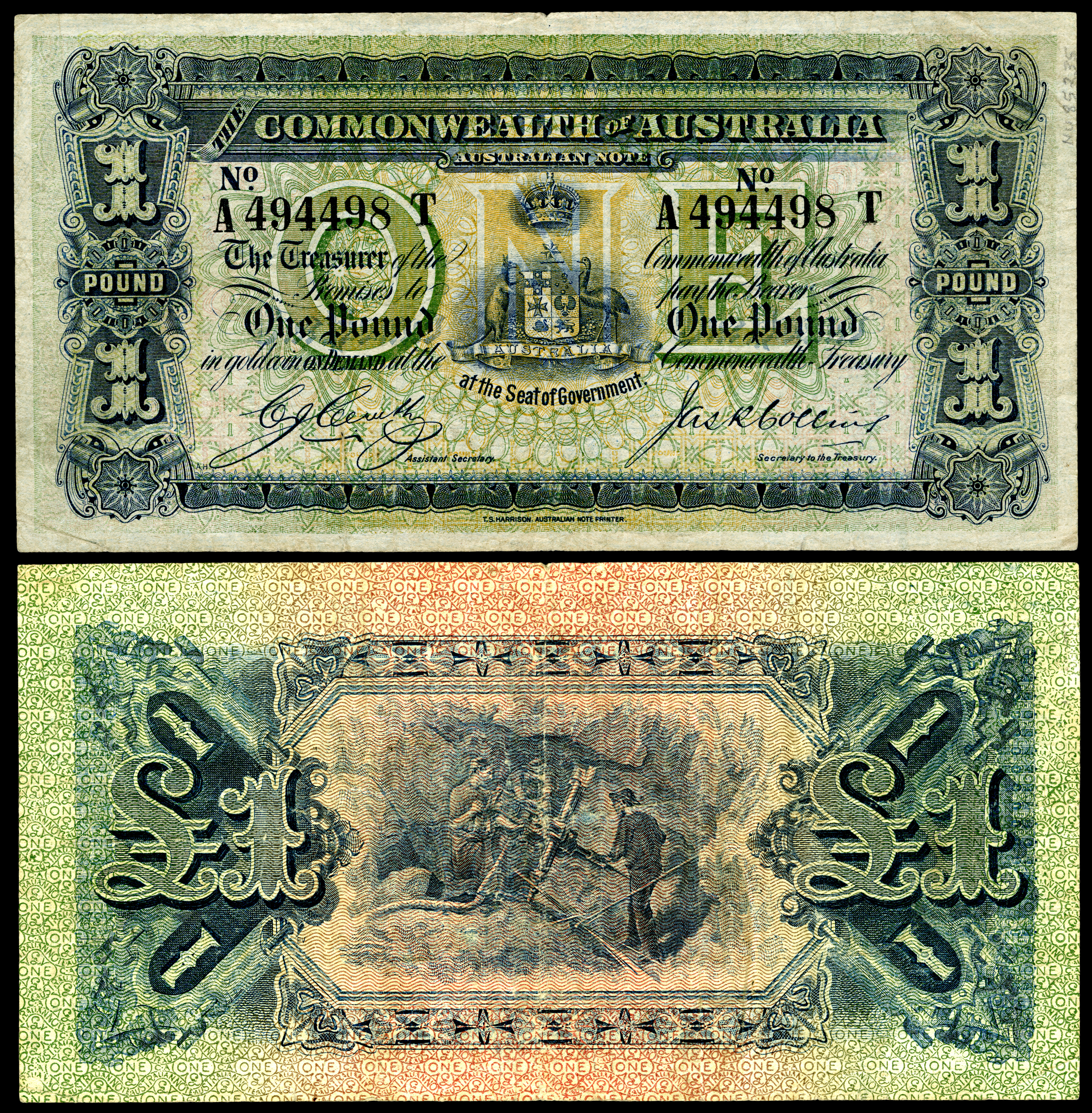
- Design date: 1913

Reverse
- Design date: 1913

The Australian one-pound note was the most prevalent banknote in circulation with the pound series, with the last series of 1953–66 having 1,066 million banknotes printed. The first banknotes issued were superscribed notes purchased from 15 banks across Australia and printed with Australian Note and were payable in gold. Upon decimalisation in 1966, it was worth two dollars.

== Historic £1 note ==
In May 2015, the National Library of Australia announced that it had discovered the first £1 banknote printed by the Commonwealth of Australia, among a collection of specimen banknotes. This uncirculated Australian Pound (£1) note, with the serial number (red-ink) P000001, was the first piece of currency to carry the coat of arms of Australia, and carries the imprinted signatures of George Allen (Secretary of the Treasury; 1 January 1901 – 13 March 1916) and James Collins (Assistant Secretary, later Secretary; 14 March 1916 – 26 June 1926). Soon after its production in 1913, it was presented to the then Prime Minister, Andrew Fisher, who retained it until 1927 when he gave it to then prime minister Stanley Bruce for donation to the Parliamentary Library. At that time, the National Library was part of the Parliamentary Library. There is a contemporaneous record in the National Archives of the accession of the note into the national collection. The curator of the collection said that the note had been placed it into a conservation sleeve sometime in the past 30 years, and that notes with similar rarity and provenance and age to this note, have been sold for over A$1m.

== Signature combinations ==
Collins and Allen (1913, 1914)
Charles Cerutty and James Collins (1918)
Miller and James Collins (1923)
Kell and James Collins (1926)
Kell and James Heathershaw (1927)
Ernest Riddle and James Heathershaw (1927)
Ernest Riddle and Sheehan (1932)
Sheehan and McFarlane (1938)
Armitage and McFarlane (1942)
H.C. Coombs and George Watt (1949)
H.C. Coombs and Wilson (1952)

== See also ==
- Banknotes of the Australian pound

== Footnotes ==
Preceded by One pound note (British)	Australian 1 pound note (section); 1910–1965	Succeeded by Two dollar note (Australian)
