= Australian ten-shilling note =

Ten shillings
- Country: Australia
- Value: ½ Australian pound
- Width: 137 mm
- Height: 76 mm
- Security features: Watermark
- Material used: Cotton
- Years of printing: 1913–1966

Obverse
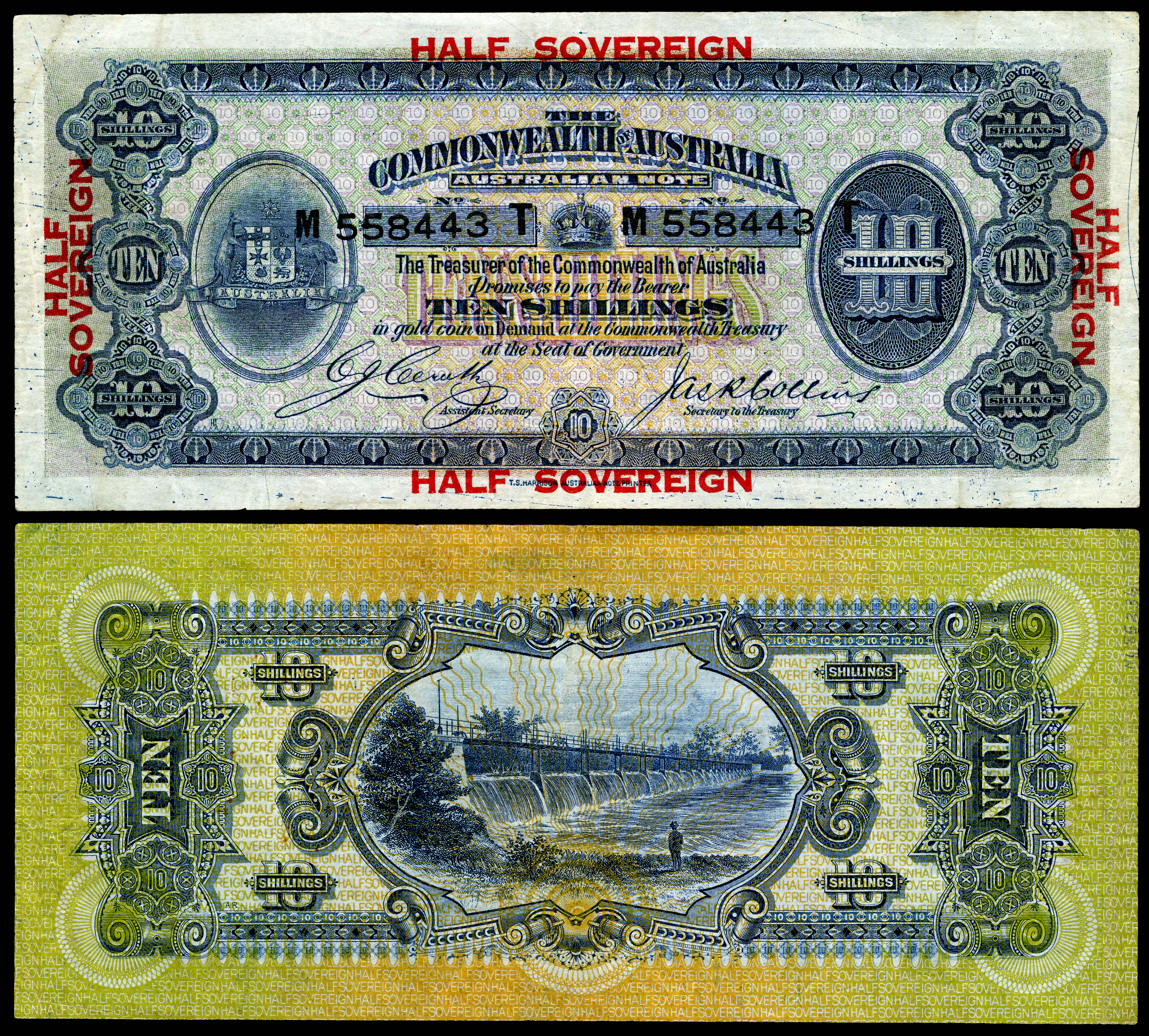
- Design: Coat of arms of Australia (1908–12)
- Designer: ?
- Design date: 1913 Second issue (1918 note date)

Reverse
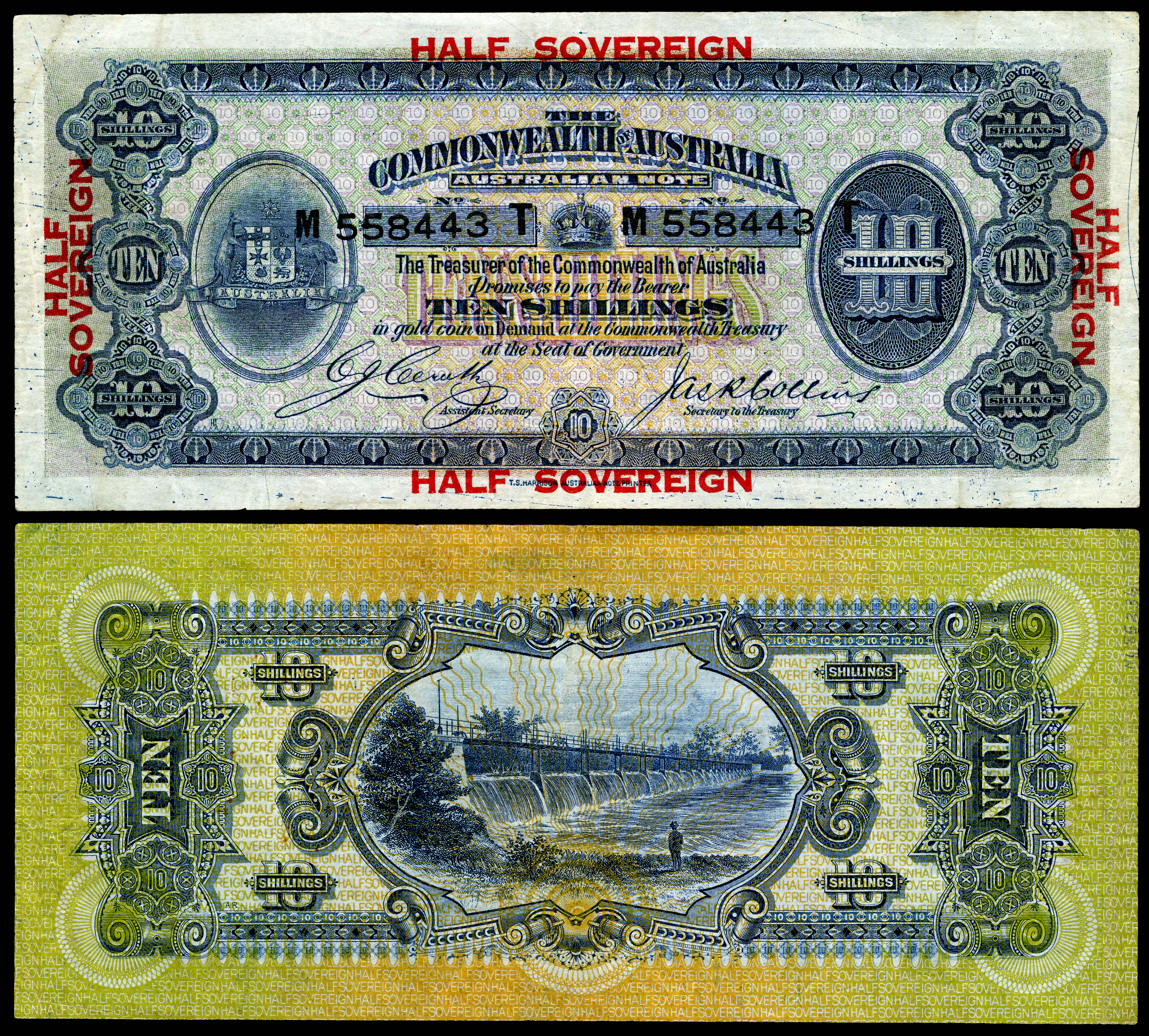
- Design: Goulburn Weir
- Designer: ?
- Design date: 1913 Second issue (1918 note date)

The 10/- banknote was first issued on 1 May 1913 as a blue banknote payable in gold. It was equal to a half sovereign gold coin. The sizes varied but the design was the same for the following issues: 1913–1914 issue was 194×83mm, 1915–1923 197×88 mm, 1923–1933 180×78mm. This issue was payable in gold but subsequent issues were legal tender.

The 1913 note was the world's first officially issued ten-shilling note. The first note, serial number M000001, was printed by Judith Denman, five-year-old daughter of the Governor-General of Australia, Lord Denman.

The ten-shilling note was equivalent to one dollar upon decimalisation in 1966.

== Signature combinations ==
- James Collins and George Allen (1913, 1915)
- [Charles John Cerutty] and James Collins (1918)
- Denison Miller and James Collins (1923)
- Kell and James Collins (1926)
- Kell and James Heathershaw (1927)
- Ernest Riddle and James Heathershaw (1928)
- Ernest Riddle and Harry Sheehan (1933, 1934, 1936)
- Harry Sheehan and Stuart McFarlane (1939)
- Hugh Traill Armitage and Stuart McFarlane (1942)
- H.C. Coombs and George Watt (1949)
- H.C. Coombs and Roland Wilson (1952, 1954, 1961)

== See also ==
- Banknotes of the Australian pound

Preceded by Ten shilling note (British)	Ten shillings (Australian); 1910–1965	Succeeded by One dollar note (Australian)
