= Australian ten-dollar note =

Current denomination of Australian currency

Ten dollars
- Country: Australia
- Value: 10 Australian dollars
- Width: 137 mm
- Height: 65 mm
- Security features: Window, Watermark
- Material used: Polymer
- Years of printing: 1993–94, 1996–98, 2002–03, 2006–2008, 2012–2013, 2015, 2017

Obverse
- Design: Andrew Barton (Banjo) Paterson
- Designer: emerystudios
- Design date: 20 September 2017

Reverse
- Design: Dame Mary Gilmore
- Designer: emerystudios
- Design date: 20 September 2017

The Australian ten-dollar note was one of the four original decimal banknotes (excluding the Australian five-dollar note) that were issued when the Australian currency was changed from the Australian pound to the Australian dollar on 14 February 1966. It replaced the Australian five-pound note, which included the same blue colouration. There have been four different issues of this denomination: a paper banknote; a commemorative hi-polymer note, to celebrate the bicentennial of Australian settlement (the first polymer banknote of its kind); the 1993–2017 polymer note; and from September 2017 a polymer note featuring a transparent window.

In June 2017, there were 128 million $10 notes in circulation, with a net value of $1.280 billion. This was 2% of the cash value of all banknotes in circulation, and 8% of the number of all banknotes in circulation.

Since the start of issue of $10 notes, there have been eleven signature combinations, of which the 1967 issue is the most valued. It was issued for one year, along with the Coombs/Wilson issue of 1966.

Following the issue of a new $5 note in September 2016, the RBA revealed the design for the new $10 note, which was issued in September 2017.

== Printing ==
From 1966 to 1974, the main title identifying Australia was Commonwealth of Australia. There were 470,000,000 notes issued in this period. This was changed to Australia until the end of issue of paper currency for this denomination in 1993, with 1,265,959,091 of these notes being printed. In the 1988 polymer issue, 17,500,000 banknotes were printed and was the new Australia 10-dollar note.

== Design ==
=== Paper note ===
The people depicted on the paper note issue are architect Francis Greenway, previously a convicted forger, on the obverse along with public buildings he helped construct, and Henry Lawson on the reverse with his poetry and scenes of the outback gold-mining town of Gulgong in the 19th century, including the Times Bakery.

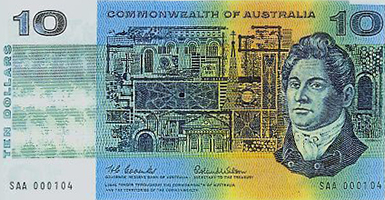
Francis Greenway

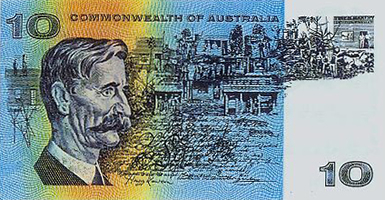
Henry Lawson

=== Polymer note ===
The polymer note, designed by Max Robinson, features Andrew Barton (Banjo) Paterson on the obverse, with a horse from the Snowy Mountains region, and a wattle plant, and his signature. His poetry is in the background. Dame Mary Gilmore is on the reverse, with a bullock train and verses from her poetry. Her signature is included. A windmill is in the clear window with the raised wavy lines. The $10 note of 2017 retains the themes of the original, with this issue featuring the Bramble Wattle (Acacia victoriae) and the Sulphur-crested Cockatoo (Cacatua galerita).

1993–2017 polymer note (obverse)

1993–2017 polymer note (reverse)

=== 1988 Commemorative note ===
The obverse design included the sailing ship HMS Supply anchored at Sydney Cove, with the early colony in the background. Above are people who symbolise all who have contributed to Australia, from the early settlers on the left, to the modern working man on the right.

The reverse design reflects the Australian Aboriginal culture and peoples. The main picture is an Aboriginal youth with ceremonial paint by Wayne Williams, with a Morning Star Pole by Terry Yumbulul, other Aboriginal artworks commissioned by the Bank, and a human-like figure from Dreamtime mythology. Yumbulul was criticised from within the Aboriginal community for permitting the reproduction of the pole by the bank and sued the Reserve Bank for breach of copyright. The bank had commissioned an agent to obtain approval, and Yumbulul claimed the agent had misled and deceived him.

A Morning Star Pole is culturally significant to the Galpu clan and Yumbulul's right to make the pole came with an obligation to "ensure that it is not used or reproduced in a way that offends against their perceptions of its significance". The Reserve Bank settled the case against it. The claim against the agent went to trial. Justice Robert French held that the copyright had been validly assigned and that, while Yumbulul may not have fully appreciated the implications of what he was doing in terms of his own cultural obligations, the agent had not engaged in misleading or deceptive conduct.

1988 commemorative polymer note (obverse)

1988 commemorative polymer note (reverse)

== Security features ==
The paper design included a watermark in the white field of Captain James Cook. The watermark was also used in the last issue of pound banknotes. A metallic strip, first near the centre of the note, then from 1976 moved to the left side on the obverse of the note.

The polymer issue includes a shadow image of the coat of arms which is printed over. Embossing or a raised image is in the clear window of wavy lines. Fluorescent colouring was added to the serial numbers. A star with four points on the obverse and three on the reverse which join under light. Raised print and microprinting of the poem The Man from Snowy River and the denomination value are included.

The 1988 Commemorative issue includes an optically variable device of Captain James Cook, who first mapped Botany Bay.
