= Land value tax in Australia =

Land value taxation history in Australia dating back from Henry George (Note: Georgist ideas were adopted to some degree in Australia.) and Graham Berry (Note: His election manifesto proposed a punitive land tax designed to break up the squatter class's great pastoral properties. The Councillors were sufficiently alarmed to pass a modified version of Berry's land tax bill, despite the urgings of the ultra-conservative former Premier Sir Charles Sladen to reject it outright. Berry, emboldened, next introduced a bill for the payment of members of the Assembly, which the trade unions were demanding so that working class candidates could be elected. Berry "tacked" the bill to the Appropriation Bill so that Council could not reject it without paralysing the Colony's finances. The Council resented this blackmail and at Sladen's urging declined to pass the bill, laying it aside.). Each Australian state has different laws of land tax.

== History ==
South Australia was the first Australian state to introduce a land tax, based on the unimproved capital value of land, in 1884. In 1910, George Allen (first secretary to the Treasury) founded the Land Tax Office to service land taxes at the federal level as a form of wealth tax and as a means to break up large tracts of underutilised land. Over time, the productivity base of the economy diversified from being mostly agrarian at the beginning of the 20th century, but wealth was held in more diverse forms and therefore federal land taxes were already ineffective. Federal land taxes were imposed until 30 June 1952, but still operate at the state/local level.

== Usage ==
Land tax is generally levied on the unimproved capital value of the land (not the total property value). This is assessed every year.

Land taxes in Australia are levied by the states, and generally apply to land holdings only within a particular state. The exemption thresholds (land tax will become payable at this dollar value) vary, as do the tax rates and other rules. Most Australians do not pay land tax, as most states provide a land tax exemption for the primary home or residence.

State	The laws of land tax	Other details	Refs
NSW	The state land tax exempts farmland and principal residences and there is a tax threshold.	Determination of land value for tax purposes is the responsibility of the Valuer-General.	
Victoria	The land tax threshold is $250,000 on the total value of all Victorian property owned by a person as at 31 December of each year, and taxed at a progressive rate. The principal residence, primary production land and land used by a charity are exempt from land tax.	—	
Tasmania	The threshold is $25,000 and the date of audit is 1 July. Between $25,000 and $350,000 the tax rate is 0.55% and over $350,000 it is 1.5%.	—	
Queensland	The threshold for individuals is $600,000 and $350,000 for other entities. The date of audit is 30 June.	—	
South Australia	The threshold is $332,000, taxed at a progressive rate. The date of audit is 30 June.	—	

By revenue, property taxes represent 4.5% of total taxation in Australia. A government report in 1986 for Brisbane, Queensland advocated a land tax.

The Henry Tax Review of 2010 commissioned by the federal government recommended that state governments replace stamp duty with land value tax. The review proposed multiple marginal rates and that most agricultural land would be in the lowest band with a zero rate. Only the ACT moved to adopt this system and planned to reduce stamp duty by 5% and raise land tax by 5% for each of 20 years.

=== Stamp duty ===
The difference between land tax and stamp duty is that the stamp duty is charged by state/territory governments on transactions like buying property and the land tax is charged by most state/territory governments on land you own.
