= Australian ten-pound note =

Old unit of Australian currency equivalent to a twenty-dollar note

Ten Pound
(Australia)
- Value: 10 Australian pounds
- Width: 1913–24: 171 mm, 1925–present: 180 mm
- Height: 1913–24: 103 mm, 1925–present: 78 mm
- Security features: patterns
- Material used: cotton
- Years of printing: 1910–1966

Obverse
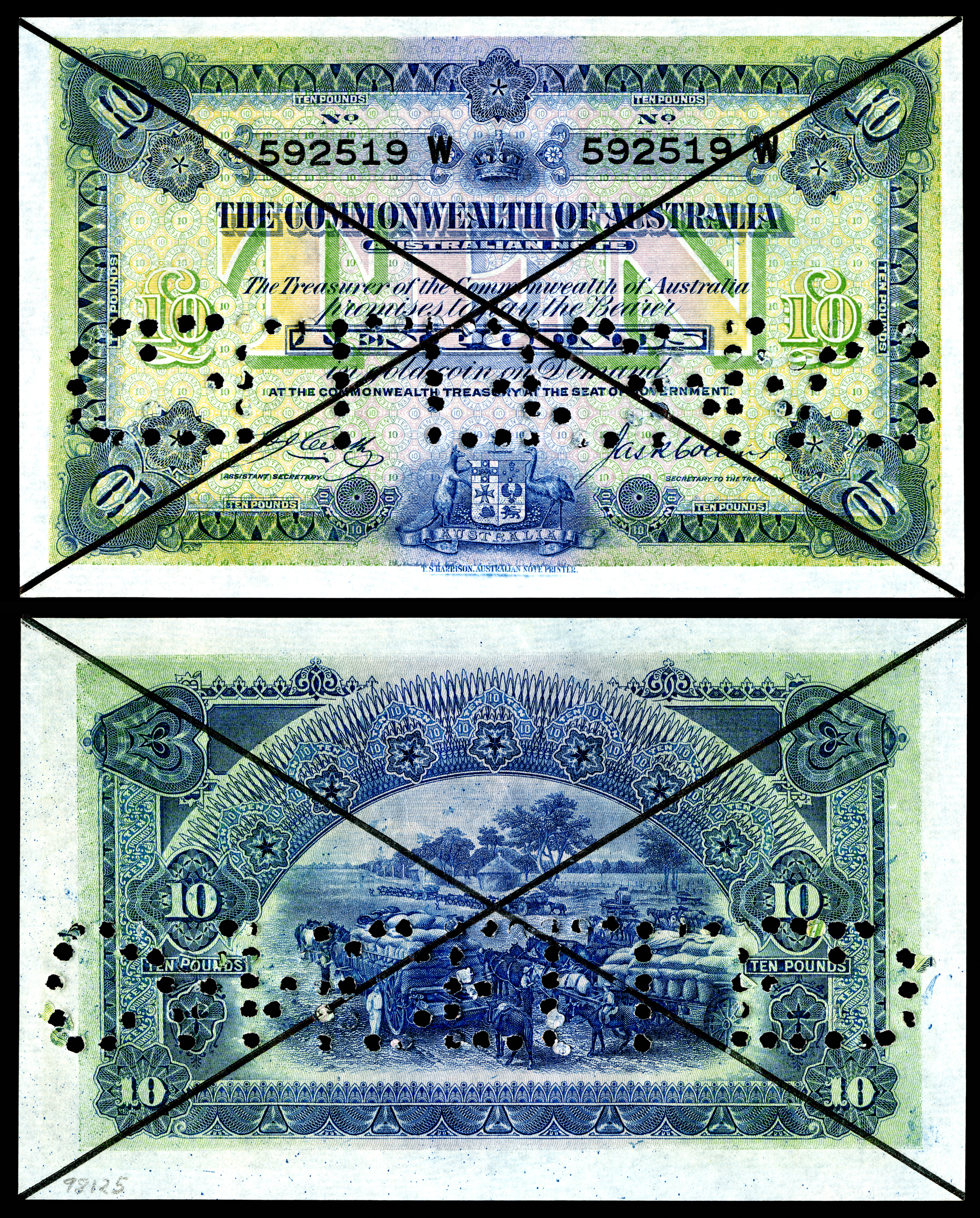
- Design: Coat of arms

Reverse
- Design: Wagons with bags of grain at Narwonah railway station

The Australian ten-pound note was a denomination of the Australian pound that was equivalent to twenty dollars on 14 February, 1966. This denomination along with all other pound denomination is still legal tender = twenty dollar note.

It was first issued in 1911 on overprinted banknotes issued by the various commercial and state banks of the time. In 1913, the first Australian banknote was issued. It featured a scene of the carting wheat at Narwonah in New South Wales.

== Timeline ==
=== 1910 ===
These banknotes were overprinted on private issue from various banks, signatures were Jas R Collins and Geo T Allen. A total of 152,675 banknotes were issued.

=== 1913–1925 ===
Signatories: Collins/Allen (1914–1917); Cerutty/Collins (1918–1924)

The first ten-pound note was issued in 1913, with 2,039,188 being printed. The reverse of the note possessed horizontal red/yellow bands.

=== 1925–1934 ===
Signatories: Kell/Collins (1925–1926); Riddle/Heathershaw (1927); Riddle/Sheehan (1933)

Designed and printed by Thomas S. Harrison, the note was made longer and narrower to improve printing efficiency (six notes could fit onto a sheet instead of four) and further security features were added: a basketweave watermark was used around the borders and the denomination appears in watermarks in the center of the note. 3,610,000 of these notes were printed.

=== 1934–1966 ===
Sheehan/McFarlane (1940); Armitage/McFarlane (1943); Coombs/Watt (1949); Coombs/Wilson (1952)

These were all legal tender and included two basic designs, those of 1934–40 has 3,076,000 issues, 1940–54 with 21,924,000 and 1954–66 with 61,151,000 banknotes issued.

== See also ==
- Banknotes of the Australian pound
