= Solomon Islands pound =

Currency of the British Solomon Islands (1899–1966)

The pound was the currency of the British Solomon Islands Protectorate between 1899 and 1966. It was divided into 20 shillings, each of 12 pence. Initially, sterling coin circulated, supplemented by local banknotes from 1916. In 1920, Australian coins and banknotes were introduced, although local paper money continued to be produced until 1932. When the Australian pound broke its parity to the sterling in 1930 during the Great Depression, this caused uncertainty in the British territories of the Western Pacific regarding whether their pound unit was a sterling or an Australian pound. This uncertainty prevailed into the mid-1930s and was only resolved when the matter was clarified by King's regulations. The final result was that all the British territories apart from Fiji adopted the Australian unit. As such, the British Solomon Islands Protectorate followed the course of Australia.

(The result was that Fiji had a distinct pound of its own that differed in value from sterling as well as from the Australian and New Zealand units. New Zealand was nearly at par with Australia, and all New Zealand controlled territories, notably Western Samoa, adopted the New Zealand unit which was later returned to parity with sterling in 1948. Papua New Guinea, the British Solomon Islands Protectorate, the Gilbert and Ellice Islands, the New Hebrides (as regards their sterling accounts), Tonga and Nauru all followed the Australian unit.)

Between 1942 and 1944, the Solomon Islands were occupied by Japan and the Oceanian pound circulated. The Australian pound returned after the war and was replaced by the Australian dollar in 1966. This was, in turn, replaced by the Solomon Islands dollar in 1977. For a more general view of history in the wider region, see British currency in Oceania.

== Banknotes ==
The first currency produced specifically for the British Solomon Islands was authorized by the British Solomon Islands Currency Regulation of 1916. The Western Pacific High Commission passed the King's Regulation No. 10 of 1916 on 14 September 1916. Prior to this regulation, the Solomon Islands used Australian and Burns Philip banknotes. The first notes worth a total of £9,000 stg. arrived in Tulagi on 9 July 1917. Printed in London by Thomas de la Rue, and dated 18 December 1916, this initial shipment consisted of 2,000 5/– notes, 2,000 10/– notes, 5,000 £1 notes, and 500 £5 notes. The notes were delivered to the Currency Office on 14 July 1917 and issued two days later. The only £5 note was the one dated 18 December 1916. The 5/– note continued to be issued until 1926; the 10/– note until 1932; and the £1 note until 1933.

== See also ==
- Economy of the Solomon Islands
- Banknotes of the British Solomon Islands Protectorate
