= Australian Reinsurance Pool Corporation =

Australian Government department offering reinsurance for high risk events

Department overview
- Formed: July 2003; 23 years ago
- Jurisdiction: Australia
- Headquarters: Sydney
- Employees: 76 (2025)
- Ministers responsible: Jim Chalmers, Treasurer; Daniel Mulino, Assistant Treasurer
- Department executive: Dr Chris Wallace, Chief Executive
- Parent department: Treasury (Australia)
- Website: arpc.gov.au

The Australian Reinsurance Pool Corporation (ARPC) is an Australian Government-owned reinsurance entity established under the Terrorism Insurance Act 2003. It administers government-backed reinsurance schemes for terrorism and cyclone-related risks and forms part of Australia's broader catastrophe risk financing framework.

== History ==
ARPC was established in 2003 following the withdrawal of terrorism insurance from commercial insurance markets after the September 11 terrorist attacks in the United States. The Australian Government introduced the Terrorism Insurance Act 2003 to restore insurance capacity for eligible commercial property risks.

In 2022, the legislation was amended and renamed the Terrorism and Cyclone Insurance Act 2003, expanding ARPC's responsibilities to include administration of a Cyclone Reinsurance Pool. The cyclone pool commenced operation on 1 July 2022 and is supported by a Commonwealth guarantee of up to A$10 billion.

== Functions ==
ARPC administers reinsurance pools established by the Australian Government to address defined catastrophic risks, including terrorism and cyclone-related damage. These schemes enable insurers to offer coverage for risks that may otherwise be excluded or unaffordable in private markets.

== Governance ==
ARPC is wholly owned by the Commonwealth of Australia and operates under the Public Governance, Performance and Accountability Act 2013. It is governed by a board and forms part of the Treasury portfolio.

== Reinsurance pools ==
=== Terrorism pool ===
The Terrorism Reinsurance Scheme provides cover for eligible terrorism-related losses affecting commercial property, associated business interruption and public liability insurance.

=== Cyclone pool ===
The Cyclone Reinsurance Pool provides reinsurance coverage for cyclone and cyclone-related flood damage affecting eligible home, strata and small business insurance policies. The scheme was established to improve insurance affordability and availability in cyclone-prone regions of Australia, particularly northern Australia.

Participation in the pool became mandatory for eligible insurers in stages between 2022 and 2024, with the Australian Competition and Consumer Commission (ACCC) undertaking annual statutory monitoring of insurance prices, costs and profits during the pool's implementation.

Since its commencement in 2022, the cyclone pool has processed claims arising from multiple cyclone events, with total claim payments exceeding A$1 billion by 2026.

== Reception and policy analysis ==
ARPC and the schemes it administers have been the subject of review and analysis by government auditors, parliamentary committees, academic researchers and industry commentators.

The Australian National Audit Office (ANAO) completed a performance audit of ARPC's administration of the Terrorism Reinsurance Scheme. The audit concluded that the scheme had been implemented in accordance with its legislative objectives while identifying opportunities to strengthen performance measurement and reporting.

A review of the Terrorism Insurance Act commissioned by the Australian Government in 2021 concluded that market conditions had not developed sufficiently to support the withdrawal of the terrorism reinsurance scheme and recommended its continuation.

Research led by the University of Queensland examined ARPC's role in addressing terrorism-related insurance market failures and compared the Australian model with similar schemes operating internationally. The study also identified future challenges relating to evolving threat environments and emerging forms of catastrophic risk.

ARPC's administration of the Cyclone Reinsurance Pool has been examined by the Joint Select Committee on Northern Australia, which received evidence from insurers, consumer groups and industry stakeholders regarding insurance affordability, competition and the operation of the scheme.

== Impact and criticism ==
Geoscience Australia has identified ARPC as a component of Australia's broader terrorism risk management framework and has referenced the corporation's role in supporting terrorism loss modelling and risk assessment activities.

Industry analyses have described ARPC as one of a relatively small number of government-backed terrorism insurance pools internationally and have highlighted its role in supporting insurance market capacity for catastrophic risks.

Assessments of the Cyclone pool’s effectiveness have produced mixed findings. Analysis by the ACCC found that the scheme has delivered cost savings in higher-risk regions, but that these have been offset by broader increases in insurance costs, including global reinsurance pressures and rising construction expenses.

News media reporting has similarly noted that while the pool has contributed to improved insurance availability in some areas, affordability challenges persist and premiums remain high in certain cyclone-prone regions.
