= Australian five-shilling note =

Five shillings
(Australia)
- Value: 1/4 Australian pound
- Width: 137 mm
- Height: 64 mm
- Security features: Watermark
- Material used: Cotton fiber
- Years of printing: 1916 and 1946

Obverse
- Design: King George VI
- Designer: ?
- Design date: ?, 1946

Reverse
- Design: One crown coin and symbols of the six states
- Designer: ?
- Design date: ?, 1946

Five shilling notes were first proposed in 1916, when the value of silver was estimated to become too expensive to use for making coins due to a possible decrease in Australia's supply of silver. The proposed note was designed to have a portrait of George VI, the King of the United Kingdom and Emperor of India, displayed on its front side. However, the need for paper notes did not arise, and by 1953, all the notes were destroyed, other than those now in the possession of Reserve Bank of Australia.
