= Jenny Wilkinson =

Australian public servant

Jenny Wilkinson PSM

Secretary of the Department of the Treasury
- Incumbent
- Assumed office June 2025

Secretary of the Department of Finance (Australia)
- In office August 2022 – June 2025

Personal details
- Education: Australian National University (BEc (Hons)); Princeton University (MPA)
- Occupation: Public servant

Jenny Wilkinson PSM is an Australian public servant. She is the Secretary of the Department of the Treasury since June 2025, the first woman to occupy this role. She served as the Secretary of the Department of Finance from August 2022 to June 2025.

Wilkinson was previously Deputy Secretary of the Treasury and has been credited for playing a significant role in a number of policies including the implementation of JobSeeker during the COVID-19 pandemic, HomeBuilder, healthcare benefits, and the crackdown on government use of private consultants.

She holds a Masters in Public Affairs from Princeton University and a Bachelor of Economics from the Australian National University.
