= Banknotes of the British Solomon Islands Protectorate =

Banknotes of the Solomon Islands (1916–1932)

Banknotes were issued by the Government of the British Solomon Islands Protectorate between 1916 and 1932. The banknotes are extremely rare.

The currency that is expressed is the Solomon Islands pound.

== Catalogue ==
- P1. 5 shillings. 18 December 1916; 27 July 1921; 2 January 1926. Green on a brown underprint.
- P2a. 10 shillings. 18 December 1916; 27 July 1921; 2 January 1926. Red.
- P2b. 10 shillings. 30 June 1932. Unissued Remainder banknote. Red.
- P3. 1 pound. 18 December 1916; 2 January 1926; 30 June 1932. Blue.
- P4. 5 pounds. 18 December 1916.
