= Dick Randall =

Australian public servant

Sir Dick Randall

Secretary of the Department of the Treasury
- In office 28 October 1966 – 31 October 1971

Personal details
- Born: Richard John Randall; 13 October 1906 Birkdale, Australia
- Died: 15 November 1982 (aged 76) Canberra, Australia
- Spouse: Nora Barry Clyne (m. 1945)
- Occupation: Public servant

Sir Richard John Randall (13 October 1906 – 15 November 1982) was a senior Australian public servant. He was Secretary of the Department of the Treasury between October 1966 and October 1971.

== Life and career ==
Dick Randall was born in Birkdale, Queensland on 13 October 1906. He attended Wynnum State High School, then qualified as a wool classer and worked in rural Queensland. He moved to Sydney and had a job with the Commonwealth Wool and Produce Co. Ltd. Having left high school after two years, he matriculated at age 26, studied accounting and then enrolled at the University of Sydney where he completed an economics degree. During this time he also contributed articles to Smith's Weekly and became its finance editor.

Randall joined the Commonwealth public service in 1940, taking up a post at the Department of the Treasury. The following year, on 27 May, he enlisted to the Australian Imperial Force, spending most of the war in Western Australia and demobilising in November 1945.

After the war, Randall rejoined Treasury, and was appointed Secretary of the Treasury in 1966. He retired from his Secretary role in October 1971.

Randall died in Canberra on 15 November 1982, aged 76.

== Awards ==
Randall was made a Knight Bachelor in 1964.

Government offices
Preceded by Roland Wilson	Secretary of the Department of the Treasury; 1966 – 1971	Succeeded by Frederick Wheeler
