= Australian five-pound note =

Australian banknote

Five Pound
- Country: Australia
- Value: 5 Australian pounds
- Width: 1913–24: 170.18 mm, 1924–present: 180.34 mm
- Height: 1913–24: 106.68 mm, 1924–present: 78.74 mm
- Security features: Mosaic of 5s
- Years of printing: 1913–1966

Obverse
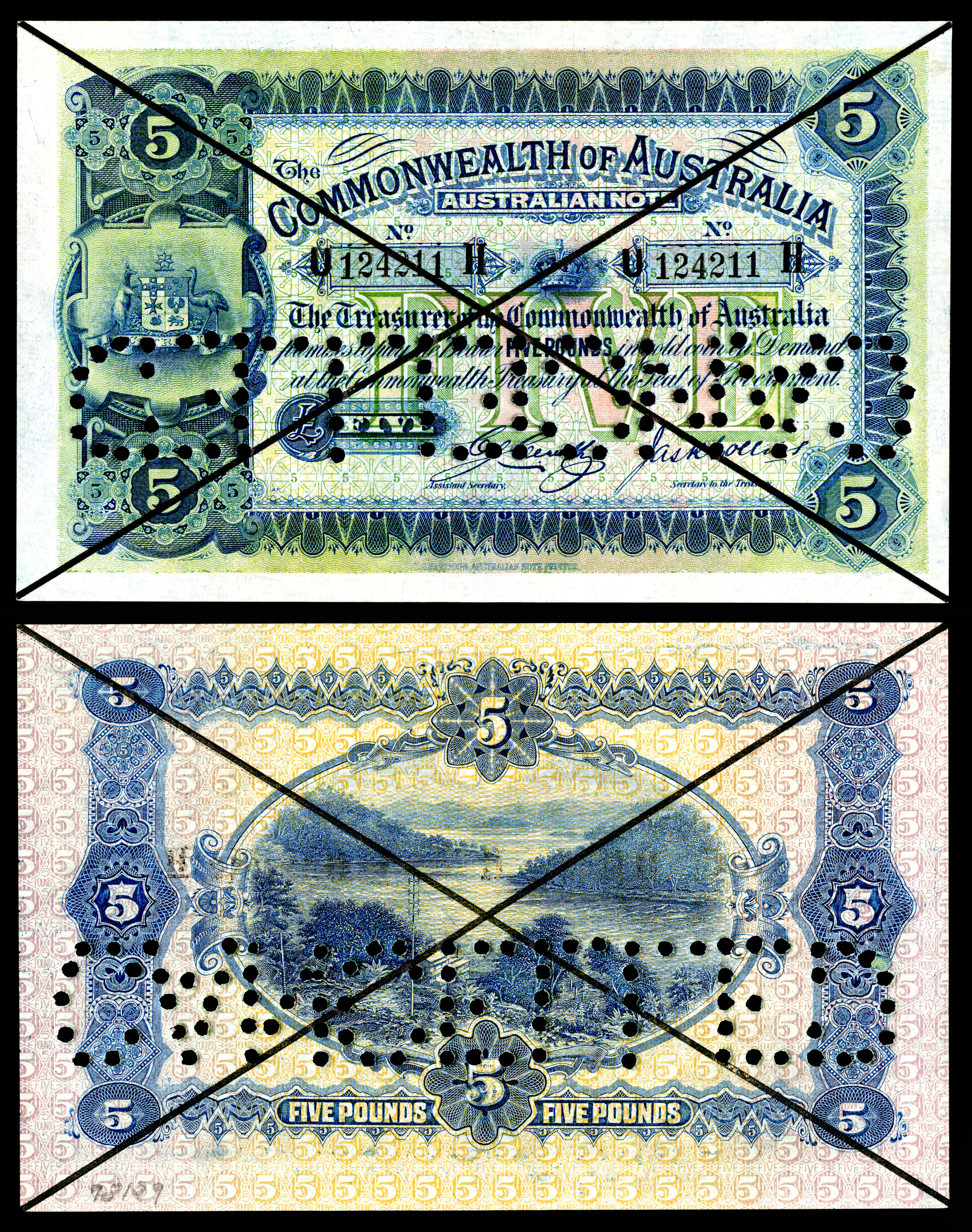
- Design: Coat of arms

Reverse
- Design: Hawkesbury River

The Australian five-pound note was first issued in 1913 and featured a scene looking along the Hawkesbury River near Brooklyn, New South Wales, from the railway toward Kangaroo Point. Upon decimalisation it had a value of 10 dollars.

== Timeline ==
=== 1913 ===
Signatories: Collins/Allen

The first five-pound note was issued in 1913, with 693,442 being printed. The reverse of the note possessed horizontal red/yellow bands.

=== 1914–1924 ===
Signatories: Collins/Allen (1914–1917); Cerutty/Collins (1918–1924)

Following the discovery of forgeries, a mosaic of fives was added to the reverse of the note and the horizontal red/yellow bands on the first design were replaced by a vertical phasing of purple/yellow/purple. 10,293,018 of these notes were printed.

=== 1924–1927 ===
Signatories: Kell/Collins (1924–1926); Kell/Heathershaw (1927)

Designed and printed by Thomas S. Harrison, the note was made longer and narrower to improve printing efficiency (six notes could fit onto a sheet instead of four) and further security features were added: a basketweave watermark was used around the borders and the denomination appears in watermarks in the center of the note. 11,290,400 of these notes were printed.

=== 1927–1933 ===
Signatories: Riddle/Heathershaw (1927, Note issuing department); Riddle/Heathershaw (1927–1932, Commonwealth Bank); Riddle/Sheehan (1932–1933)

29,133,000 banknotes of this type were issued, the only change was the "Chairman of Directors, Note Issuing Department, Commonwealth Bank of Australia" to " Governor, Commonwealth Bank of Australia".

=== 1933–1939 ===
Signatories: Riddle/Sheehan (1933–1939)

This was a new design and the last issue with King George V, and lasted three years after his death. The colour was blue but 181×79, and was legal tender. The obverse has the Kings portrait on the left with the coat of arms on the right sides, the reverse has on the left two men carrying bags and one rolling a barrel representing commerce, five was on the right side.

=== 1939–1952 ===
Signatories: Sheehan/McFarlane (1939–1941); Armitage/McFarlane (1941–1949); Coombs/Watt (1949–1952); Coombs/Wilson (1952)

This was the first issue with King George VI, and the last with a reigning British monarch. The note's design was unchanged until his passing thirteen years later.

== See also ==
- Banknotes of the Australian pound
