= Australian one-dollar note =

Former denomination of Australian currency

One dollar
- Country: Australia
- Value: 1 Australian dollar
- Width: 140 mm
- Height: 70 mm
- Security features: metallic security thread, Watermark
- Material used: Cotton fibre
- Years of printing: 1966–1984

Obverse
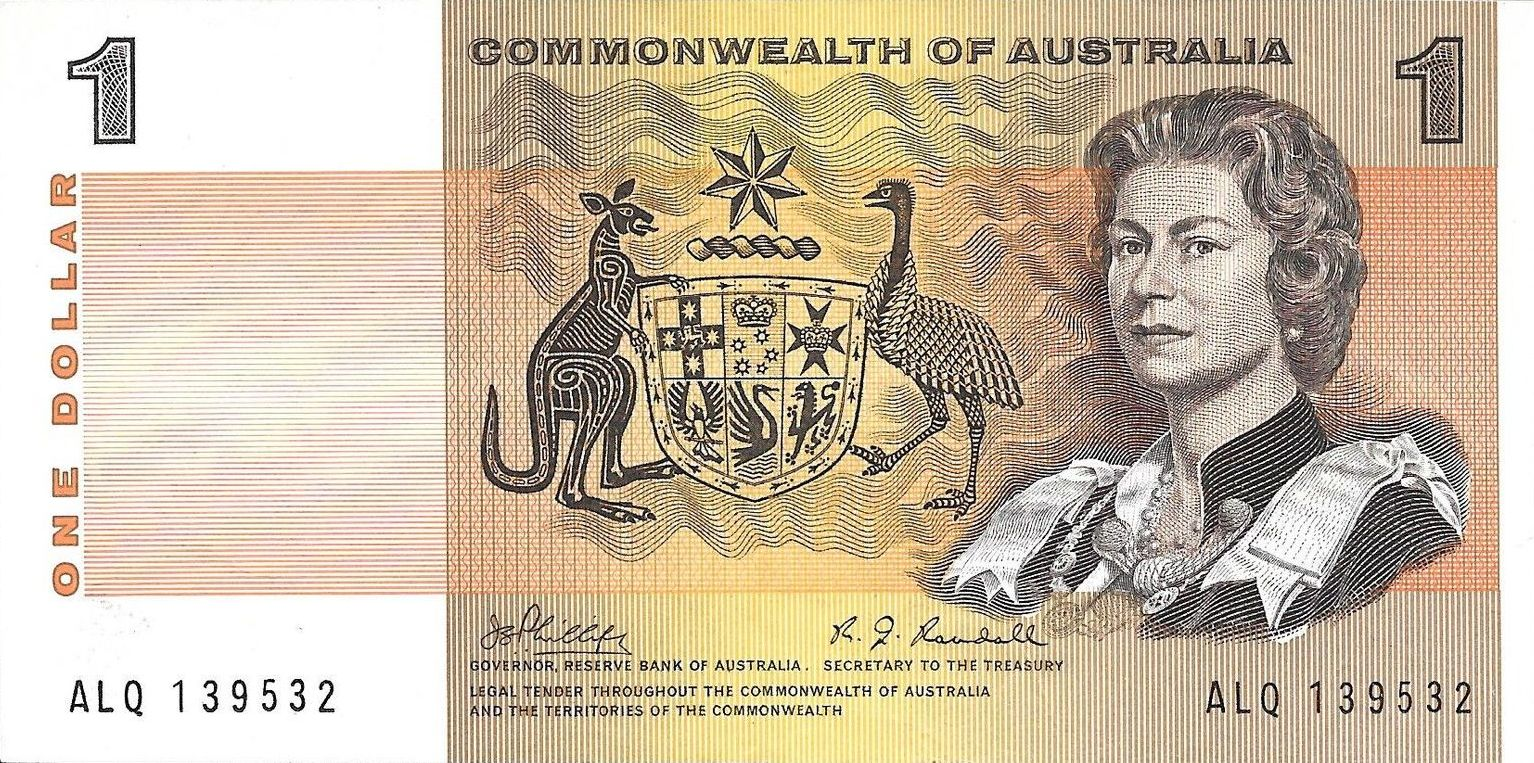
- Design: Elizabeth II and the coat of arms of Australia
- Designer: Gordon Andrews
- Design date: 1965

Reverse
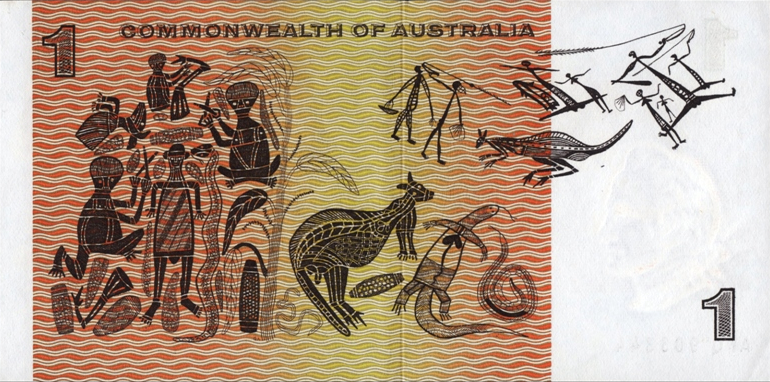
- Design: Yolngu artwork by David Malangi
- Designer: David Malangi
- Design date: 1965

The Australian one-dollar note was introduced in 1966 due to decimalisation, to replace the 10-shilling note. The note was issued from its introduction in 1966 until its replacement by the one-dollar coin in 1984. Approximately 1.7 billion one-dollar notes were printed.

== Printing ==
During the note's issue, between its introduction and 1974, the note bore "Commonwealth of Australia" as the identification of country. At least 680,000,000 notes were printed in this time period. After 1974 and until the dollar coin was introduced in 1984, the note bore "Australia" as its identification of country. Around 1,020,000,000 such notes were printed after 1974.

== Design ==
The Australian one-dollar note was designed by Gordon Andrews, the design being accepted in April 1964.

The note features Queen Elizabeth II wearing Garter robes on the obverse with the Australian coat of arms. This portrait was based on a photo taken by Douglas Glass.

The reverse of the note features Aboriginal contemporary art, created by David Malangi. The artwork depicts the "mortuary feast" of one of the artist's creation ancestors, Gunmirringu, the great ancestral hunter. The Manharrngu people attribute this story as the origin of their mortuary rites. The design was used without the artist's knowledge. It was acknowledged in 1967 with the release of the banknote, and he was later financially compensated after intervention by the Governor of the Reserve Bank, H. C. Coombs, as well as receiving a specially struck medal. The payment by the Reserve Bank to Malangi began issues of Aboriginal copyright in Australia.

The reverse also includes a selection of rock art. For example, the group of four figures in the top right corner is taken from an art work found on Injalak mountain, located near Gunbalanya in West Arnhem Land in the Northern Territory of Australia.

== Security features ==
The paper design included a watermark of Captain James Cook in the white field; the watermark was also used in the last issue of pound banknotes. An upright internal metallic strip was first placed near the centre of the note, then from 1976 was moved to the left side as viewed from the obverse.

== Removal from circulation ==
The one-dollar note was replaced by the current gold-coloured coin on 13 May 1984, due to the longer service life and cost effectiveness of coins. These notes can still be redeemed at face value by the Reserve Bank of Australia and most commercial banks, but numismatics and note collectors may pay a higher price for these notes depending on age and condition.

Preceded by Australian ten-shilling note	One dollar (Australian); 1966–1984	Succeeded by Australian one-dollar coin
