= Ernest Riddle =

Australian banker (1873–1939)

Sir Ernest Riddle
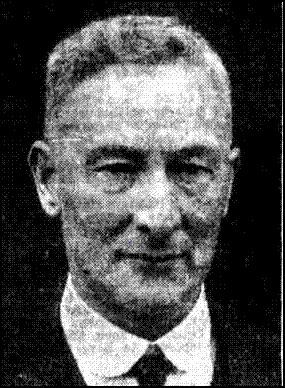

Governor of the Commonwealth Bank of Australia
- In office 1927–1938
- Preceded by: James Kell
- Succeeded by: Harry Sheehan

Personal details
- Born: Ernest Cooper Riddle; 5 April 1873 Narrabri
- Died: 28 February 1939 (aged 65) Woollahra
- Profession: Banker

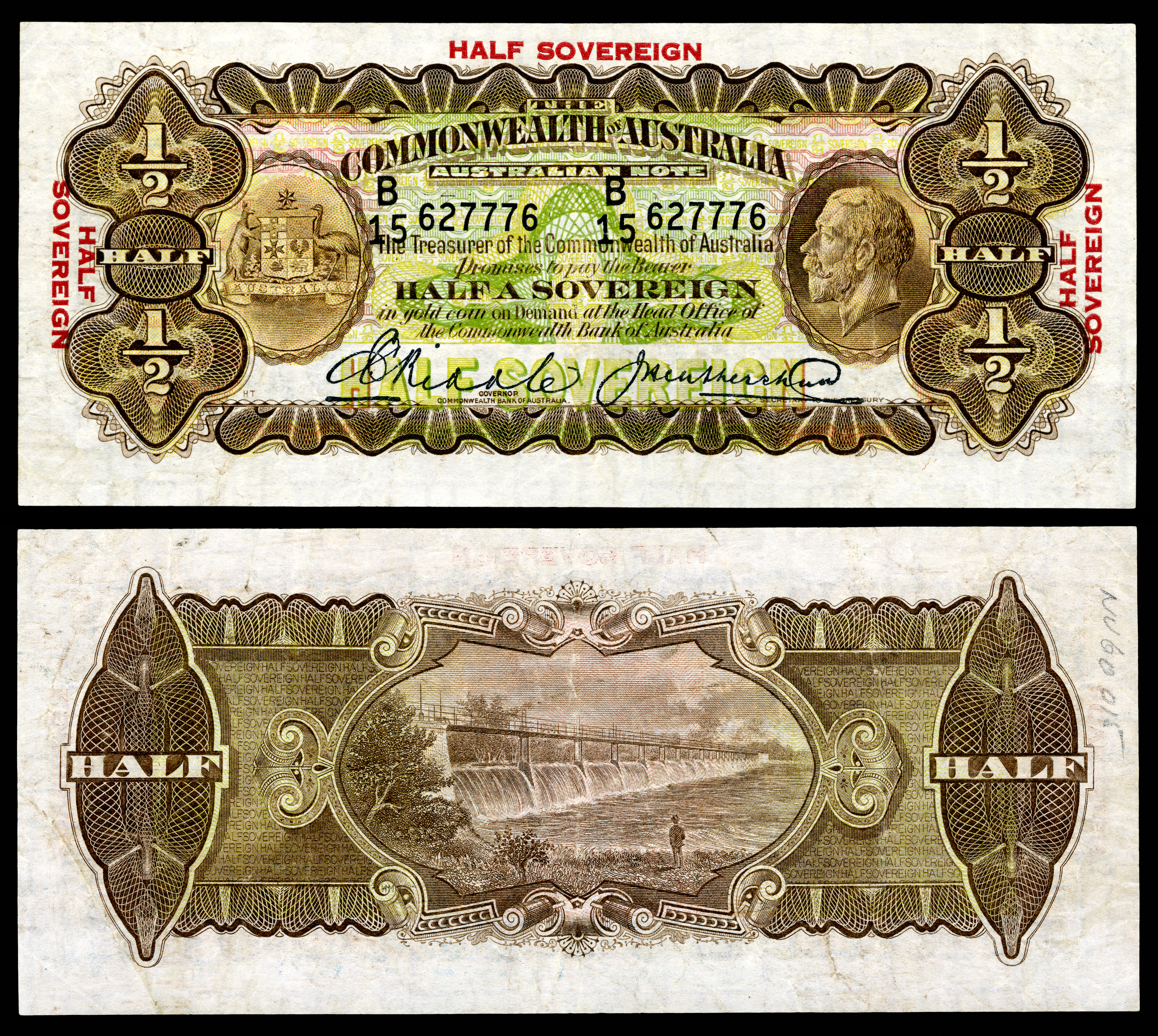
1933 Australian Half-Sovereign banknote signed by Riddle.

Sir Ernest Cooper Riddle (5 April 1873 – 28 February 1939) was an Australian banker who served as governor of the Commonwealth Bank, then Australia's central bank, from 1927 to 1938.

== Early life ==
Riddle was born in Narrabri, New South Wales, the son of pastoralist John Riddle. In 1889, aged 16, he joined the Narrabri branch of the Bank of Australasia as a clerk. In 1915, Riddle joined the Commonwealth Bank and was appointed the manager of the Perth branch, where he remained until he transferred to Sydney as the acting manager. In 1924, he was promoted to inspector and was transferred to manage the Melbourne branch of the bank.

== Governor of the Commonwealth Bank ==
In 1925, Riddle was appointed deputy governor of the Commonwealth Bank and in 1927 became the bank's governor, a position he held until his retirement in 1938. Highly popular, Riddle served as Australia's most senior banker through the entire Great Depression. He attended the British Empire Economic Conference in Ottawa in 1932 as an adviser on financial matters to the Australian delegation. He also travelled twice to London where he played a vital part in exchange-rate deliberations. Riddle argued against exchange-rate appreciation, opposing the position of the Commonwealth Bank's chairman Sir Robert Gibson. Supported by the Bank of England and aided by a lack of enthusiasm for Gibson's proposal by some board members, Riddle's advice was accepted. Riddle gave evidence at the Royal Commission appointed to inquire into Australia's monetary and banking systems, which ran from 1935 to 1937.

Riddle resigned from the Commonwealth Bank on 28 February 1938 due to ill health.

== Personal life ==
Riddle was a keen sportsman and was considered to be an expert rifle shot and a first class golfer and tennis player. He was a member of the Royal Sydney Golf Club and the Australian Club. For many years he was a major in the Army Reserve and during World War I commanded a training camp in Perth. He married Annie Bibby of Manchester, England in 1899 and had two children.

Riddle was knighted in 1935.

Preceded by James Kell	Governor of the Commonwealth Bank; 1927–1938	Succeeded by Harry Sheehan
