= Narwonah railway station =

Narwonah was a railway station on the Parkes–Narromine railway line on the outskirts of Narromine in the Central West region of New South Wales. The station is 547.05 kilometres (339.92 mi) from Sydney. It opened on 12 December 1910 and on 23 November 1974, it closed to passengers. The locality was featured on the Australian ten-pound note.
