= Optical variable device =

An optical variable device or optically variable device (OVD) is an iridescent or non-iridescent security feature that exhibits different information, such as movement or colour changes, depending on the viewing and/or lighting conditions. The particular changes of appearance when rotating and tilting are reversible, predictable and reproducible. OVDs cannot be photocopied or scanned, nor can they be accurately replicated or reproduced. OVDs are often used as security devices and anti-counterfeiting measures on banknotes, government-issued identification documents, or credit cards. OVDs can be created through a combination of printing and embossing.

OVDs are based on diffractive optical structures. This gives cards the appearance of having different patterns, colours, and designs depending on the amount of light striking the OVD and the angle the OVD is viewed at. Holograms are a type of OVD.
