= Australian pound =

Currency of Australia from 1910 to 1966

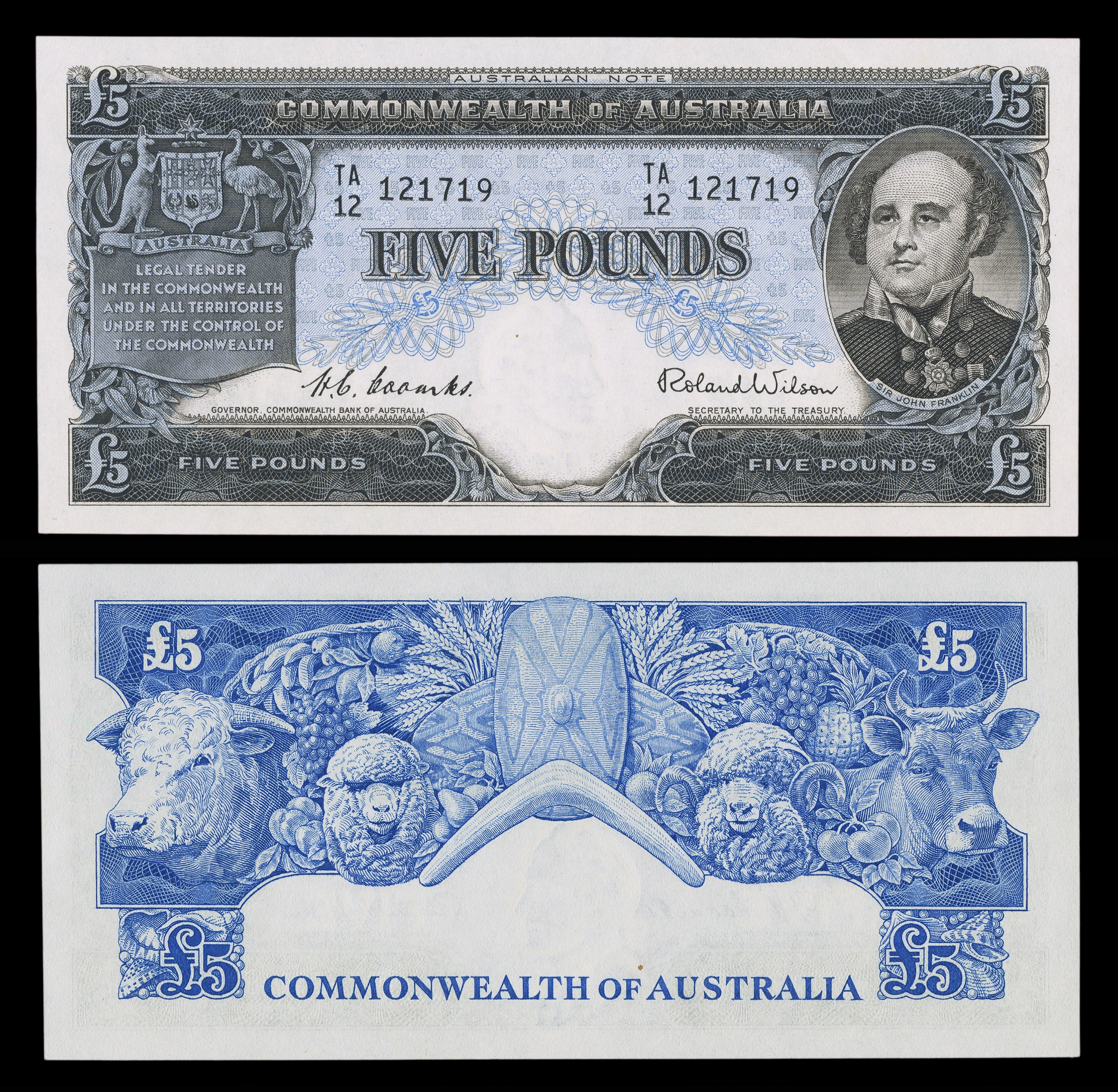
Five Pounds
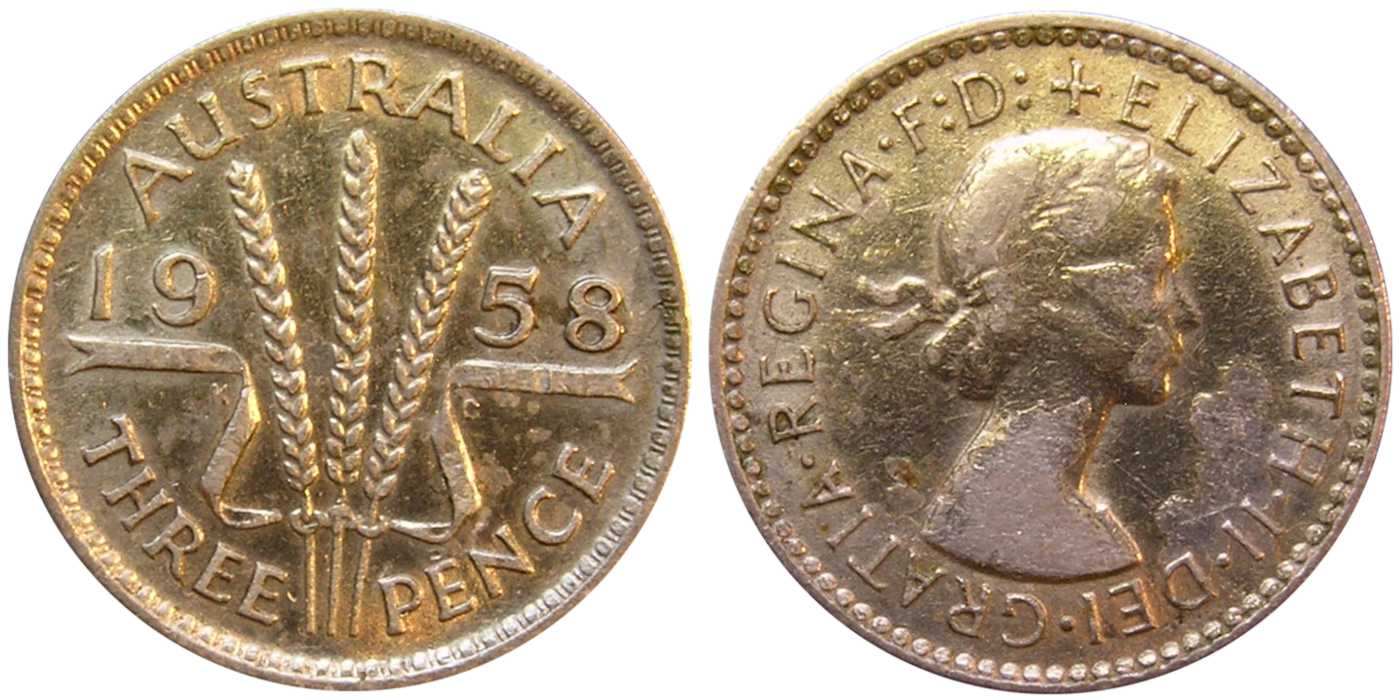
Threepence

Units of account
- Base unit: pound
- Plural: pounds
- Symbol: £
- Subunit
- 1/20: shilling
- 1/240: penny
- Plural
- penny: pence
- Symbol
- shilling: s, /–
- penny: d

Denominations
- Banknotes
- Freq. used: 10/–, £1, £5, £10
- Rarely used: £20, £50, £100, £1,000
- Coins: 1/2d, 1d, 3d, 6d, 1/-, 2/-, 5/- (5/- only used from 1937 to 1938)

Demographics
- Date of introduction: 1910; 116 years ago
- Date of withdrawal: 14 February 1966; 60 years ago
- Replaced by: Australian dollar
- User(s): Australia

Issuance
- Central bank: Treasury (1910–1920); Commonwealth Bank of Australia (1920–1960); Reserve Bank of Australia (1960–1966)

Valuation
- Pegged with: initially to sterling at par, then at £A 1 = 16 shillings sterling
- Pegged by: New Guinea pound at par
- This infobox shows the latest status before this currency was rendered obsolete.

The pound (sign: £, £A for distinction) was the currency of Australia from 1910 until 14 February 1966, when it was replaced by the Australian dollar. Like other £sd currencies, it was subdivided into 20 shillings (denoted by s), each of which was subdivided into 12 pence (denoted by d). A slash was used to separate the units.

== History ==
The establishment of a separate Australian currency was contemplated by section 51(xii) of the Constitution of Australia, which gave the Federal Parliament power to legislate with respect to "currency, coinage, and legal tender".

=== Establishment ===
==== Coinage ====
The Deakin government's Coinage Act 1909 distinguished between "British coin" and "Australian coin", giving both status as legal tender of equal value. The act gave the Treasurer the power to issue silver, bronze and nickel coins, with the dimensions, size, denominations, weight and fineness to be determined by proclamation of the Governor-General. The first coins were issued in 1910, produced by the Royal Mint in London.

==== Paper currency ====
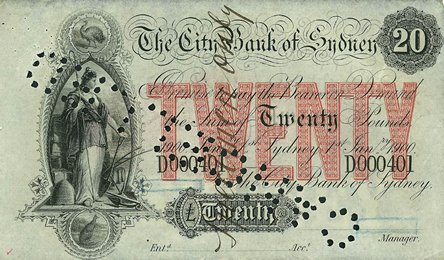
City Bank of Sydney in Australia cancelled £20 banknote

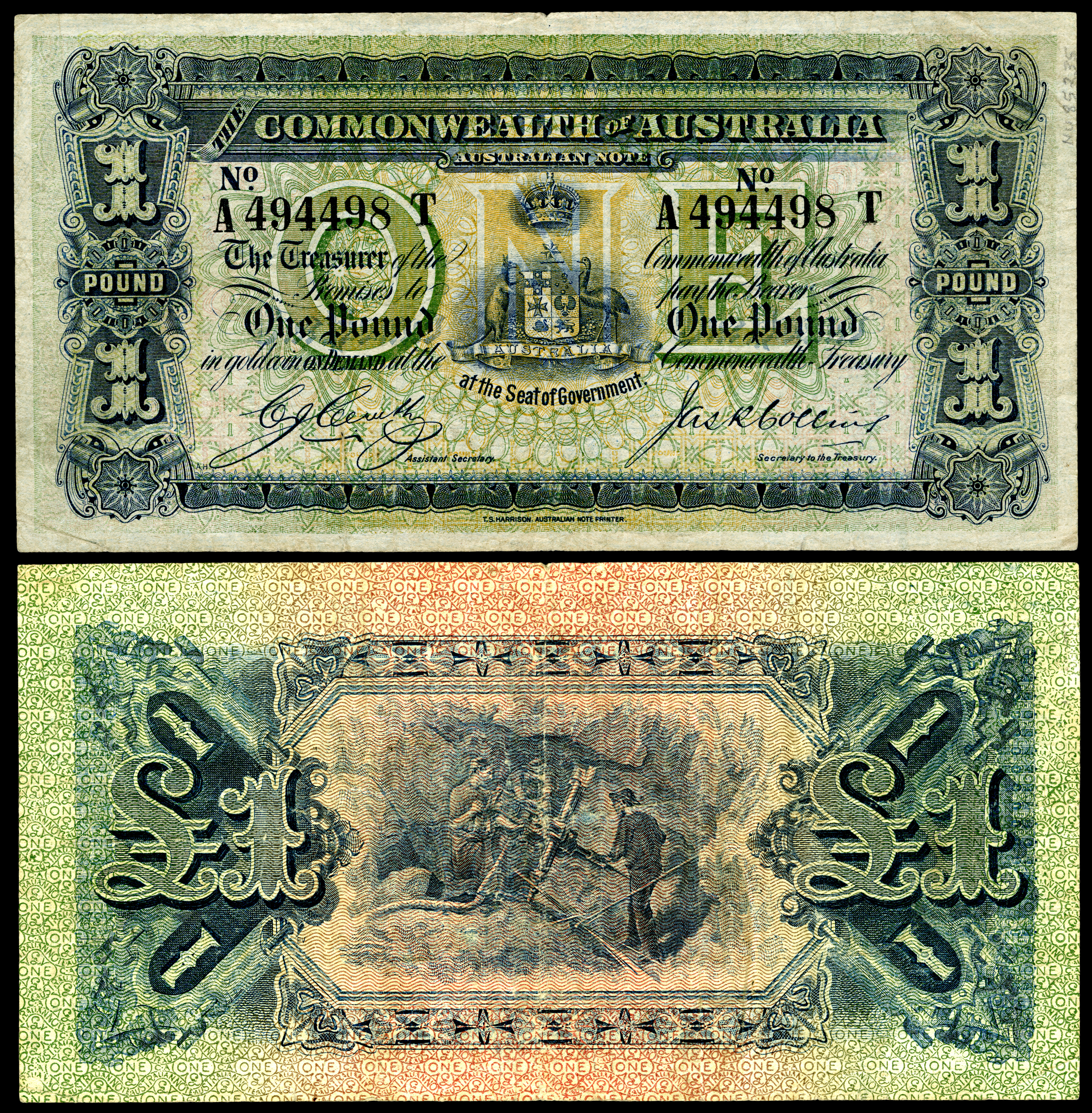
Commonwealth of Australia, £1 (1918) (Note: The pound (in banknote form) was first issued in Australia in 1910 by a limited number of Australian chartered banks. The first year of issue for the Commonwealth of Australia Treasury Note pound was 1913. The pictured note is from the 1913 second issue (printed in 1918).)

The Fisher Government's Australian Notes Act 1910 gave the Governor-General the power to authorise the Treasurer to issue "Australian notes" as legal tender, "payable in gold coin on demand at the Commonwealth Treasury". It also prohibited the circulation of state notes and withdrew their status as legal tender. In the same year the Bank Notes Tax Act 1910 was passed imposing a prohibitive tax of 10% per annum on "all bank notes issued or re-issued by any bank in the Commonwealth after the commencement of this act, and not redeemed", which effectively ended the use of private currency in Australia.

As a transitional measure lasting three years, blank note forms of 16 banks were supplied to the government in 1911 to be overprinted as redeemable in gold and issued as the first Commonwealth notes. Some of these banknotes were overprinted by the treasury, and circulated as Australian banknotes until new designs were ready for Australia's first federal government-issued banknotes, which commenced in 1913.

In May 2015, the National Library of Australia announced that it had discovered the first £A 1 banknote printed by the Commonwealth of Australia, among a collection of specimen banknotes. This uncirculated Australian pound note, with the serial number P000001 printed with red ink, was the first piece of currency to carry the coat of arms of Australia.

=== Gold standard ===
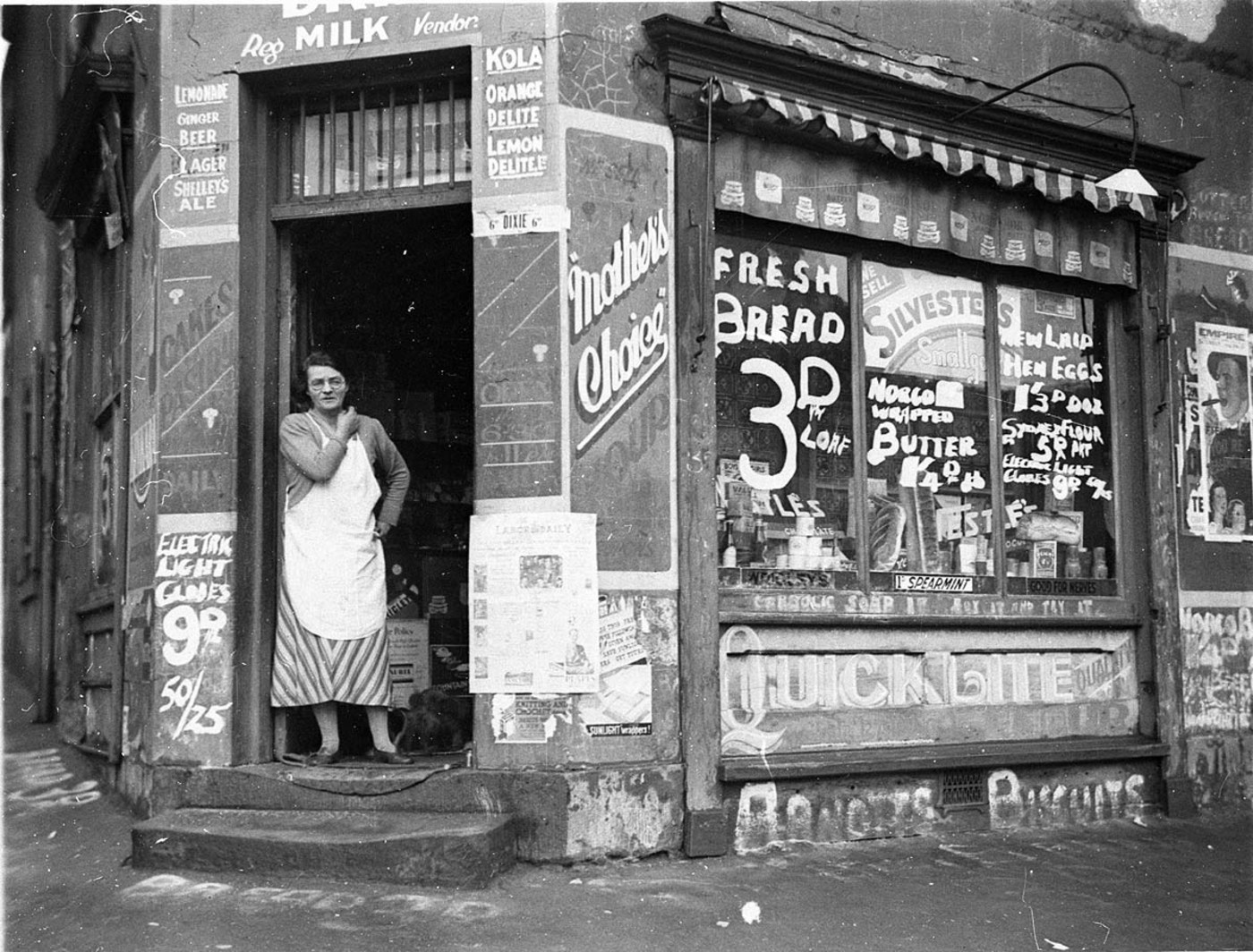
A corner grocery store in Sydney in 1934 with prices in shillings (/-) and pence (d)

The Australian currency was fixed in value to sterling. As such Australia was on the gold standard so long as Britain was.

In 1914, the British government removed sterling from the gold standard. When it was returned to the gold standard in 1925, the sudden increase in its value (imposed by the nominal gold price) unleashed crushing deflationary pressures. Both the initial 1914 inflation and the subsequent 1926 deflation had far-reaching economic effects throughout the British Empire, Australia and the world. In 1929, as an emergency measure during the Great Depression, Australia left the gold standard, resulting in a devaluation relative to sterling. A variety of pegs to sterling applied until December 1931, when the government devalued the local unit by 20%, making one Australian pound equal to 16 shillings sterling (conversely, one pound sterling became equal to 25 Australian shillings).

Coins of the Australian pound also circulated freely in New Zealand, although they were never legal tender. By 1931, Australian coins made up approximately 30% of the total circulation in New Zealand. The devaluation of Australian and New Zealand exchange rates relative to the pound sterling led to New Zealand's Coinage Act 1933 and the issuing of the first coinage of the New Zealand pound.

=== World War II ===
During World War II, the Empire of Japan produced currency notes denominated in the Australian pound for use in Pacific island countries intended for occupation. Since mainland Australia was never occupied, the occupation currency was not used there, but it was used in the captured parts of the then-Australian territories of Papua and New Guinea.

=== Post-war devaluation ===
In 1949, when the United Kingdom devalued sterling against the US dollar, Australian Prime Minister and Treasurer Ben Chifley followed suit so the Australian pound would not become over-valued in sterling zone countries with which Australia did most of its external trade at the time. As one pound sterling went from US$4.03 to US$2.80, the Australian pound went from US$3.224 to US$2.24.

=== Decimalisation ===
Decimalisation had been proposed for Australian currency since 1902, when a select committee of the House of Representatives, chaired by George Edwards, had recommended that Australia adopt a decimal currency with the florin (two shillings) as its base.

In February 1959 the Commonwealth Government appointed a Decimal Currency Committee to investigate the advantages and disadvantages of a decimal currency, and, if a decimal currency was favoured, the unit of account and denominations of subsidiary currency most appropriate for Australia, the method of introduction and the cost involved.

The committee presented its report in August 1960. It recommended the introduction of the new system on the second Monday in February 1963. In July 1961 the Commonwealth Government confirmed its support of a decimal currency system, but considered it undesirable to make final decisions on the detailed arrangement that would be necessary to effect the change. On 7 April 1963 the Commonwealth Government announced that a system of decimal currency was to be introduced into Australia at the earliest practicable date, and gave February 1966, as the tentative change-over date. On 14 February 1966, a decimal currency, the dollar of one hundred cents, was introduced.

Under the implementation conversion rate, one pound was set as the equivalent of two dollars. Thus, ten shillings became one dollar, and one shilling became ten cents. As a shilling was equal to twelve pence, a cent was worth slightly more than a penny.

== Coins ==
In 1855, gold full and half sovereigns (worth, respectively, £1 and 10/– sterling) were first minted by the Sydney Mint. These coins were the only non-Imperial denominations issued by any of the Australian mints until after Federation (the Sydney Mint struck Imperial gold sovereigns and half sovereigns starting in 1871, and the Melbourne Mint starting in 1872).

In 1910, .925 fineness sterling silver coins were minted in denominations of 3d, 6d, 1/– and 2/– (known as a Trey, Zac, Deena, and Florin respectively). Unusually no half crown (worth 2/6) was ever issued. Bronze 1/2d and 1d coins followed in 1911. Production of half sovereigns ceased in 1916, followed by that of sovereigns in 1931. In 1937 a crown (5/– piece, known as a Dollar) was issued to commemorate the coronation of King George VI. This coin proved unpopular in circulation and was discontinued shortly after being reissued in 1938.

In 1946, the fineness of Australian silver sixpences, shillings, and florins was reduced to .500, a quarter of a century after the same change had been made in Britain. In New Zealand and the United Kingdom, silver was soon abandoned completely in everyday coinage, but Australian .500 silver coins continued to be minted until after decimalisation.

== Banknotes ==
Examples of private issue paper currency in New South Wales, denominated in sterling, exist from 1814 (and may date back to the 1790s). Denominated in sterling (and in some cases Spanish dollars), these private banker and merchant scrip notes were used in Sydney and Hobart through 1829. Private issue banknotes were issued between 1817 and 1910 in denominations ranging from £1 to £100. In 1910, superscribed banknotes were used as the Commonwealth's first national paper currency until the Treasury began issuing Commonwealth banknotes in 1913. The Commonwealth Bank Act of 1920 gave note-issuing authority to the Commonwealth Bank.

== See also ==
- Australian dollar
- New Zealand pound
- British currency in Oceania

== Sources ==
- Pitt, Michael T., ed. (2013). Renniks Australian Coin and Banknote Values (25 ed.). Renniks Publications. ISBN 978-0-9873386-2-4.

Preceded by: Sterling; Ratio: at par	Currency of Australia; 1910 – 1966	Succeeded by: Australian dollar Reason: decimalisation Ratio: 2 dollars = 1 pound
