= Denison Miller =

Australian banker

Sir Denison Miller KCMG
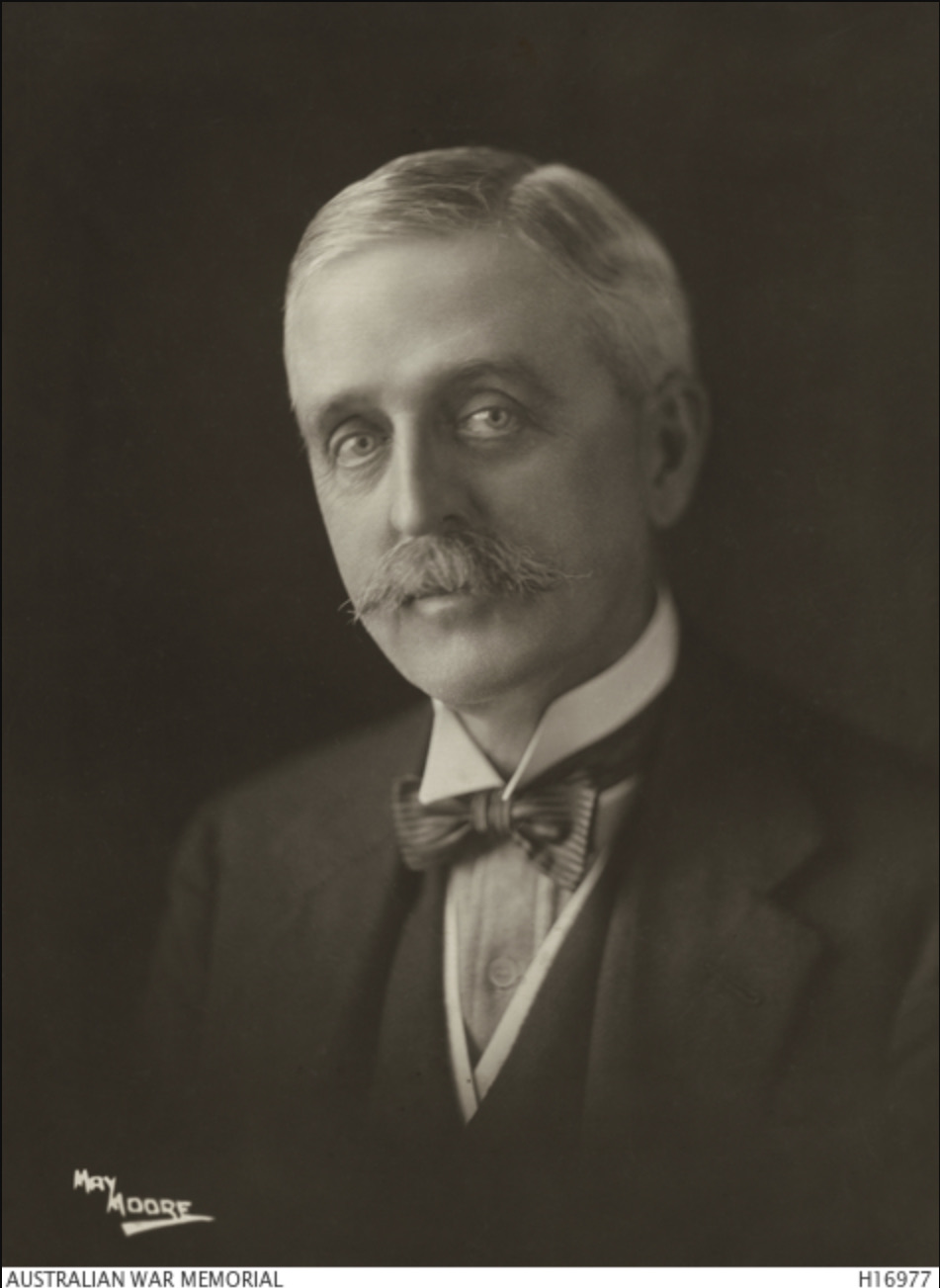
- Born: 8 March 1860; Fairy Meadow, New South Wales, Australia
- Died: 6 June 1923 (aged 63); Sydney, New South Wales, Australia
- Resting place: Waverley Cemetery
- Occupation: Banker

Sir Denison Samuel King Miller KCMG, (8 March 1860 – 6 June 1923) was the first governor of the Commonwealth Bank of Australia.

== Early life ==
Miller was born at Fairy Meadow, near Wollongong, New South Wales, the son of Samuel King Miller, head teacher at the Deniliquin public school and his wife Sarah Isabella, née Jones. He completed his education there.

Government offices
New title	Governor of the Commonwealth Bank of Australia; 1912–1923	Succeeded by James Kell
