= Stuart McFarlane =

Australian public servant

Stuart McFarlane CMG

Secretary of the Department of the Treasury
- In office 1 March 1938 – 31 December 1949

Personal details
- Born: Stuart Gordon McFarlane; 4 May 1885 Maldon, Victoria
- Died: 2 November 1970 (aged 85) Canberra
- Resting place: Canberra Cemetery
- Spouse(s): Mary Grace McDermott (m. 1923; d. 1952); Evelyn Mary, née Bray (m. 1958)
- Children: Ian McFarlane
- Occupation: Public servant

Stuart Gordon McFarlane CMG (4 May 1885 – 31 December 1970) was a senior Australian public servant. He was Secretary of the Department of the Treasury between 1938 and 1949.

== Life and career ==
Stuart McFarlane was born at Maldon, Victoria on 4 May 1885.

McFarlane began his career in the Commonwealth public service as a clerk in the Finance Branch of the Department of the Treasury in 1903. Between 1911 and 1926, he worked in the Postmaster-General's Department.

He went on to serve as Assistant Secretary of the Finance Branch between 1926 and 1932, and then Assistant Secretary in the Administration Branch.

He was appointed Secretary of the Treasury in March 1938.

During his time in the public service, McFarlane travelled quite extensively, including to India, Papua New Guinea and England.

== Awards ==
In 1933, McFarlane was made a Companion of the Order of St Michael and St George.

Government offices
| Preceded by Harry Sheehan | Secretary of the Department of the Treasury; 1938 – 1949 | Succeeded by George Watt |
