= George Watt (public servant) =

Australian public servant and company director

George Watt CBE CMG

Secretary of the Department of the Treasury
- In office 23 November 1948 – 31 March 1951

Personal details
- Born: George Percival Norman Watt; 2 June 1890 Hawthorn, Melbourne
- Died: 21 July 1983 (aged 93)
- Spouse(s): Nellie Victoria May Hough (m. 1916–1963)
- Occupation: Public servant

George Percival Norman Watt CBE CMG (2 June 1890 – 21 July 1983) was a senior Australian public servant and company director. He was Secretary of the Department of the Treasury between November 1948 and March 1951.

== Life and career ==
George Watt was born in Hawthorn, Melbourne on 2 June 1890. He was schooled at Auburn State School and Wesley College.

He joined the Australian Public Service in the Department of Defence in 1908. During World War II, he was transferred on a temporary basis to the Department of the Treasury, serving as the head of the defence division in Melbourne. He became the Secretary of the Treasury in November 1948, after having acted in the role since February 1948.

In March 1951 Watt retired from his Secretary role to become chairman of the National Airlines Commission.

Watt died on 21 July 1983, aged 93.

== Awards ==
Watt was made a Commander of the Order of the British Empire in June 1951. He was appointed a Companion of the Order of St Michael and St George in June 1957 for services to civil aviation in Australia.

Government offices
Preceded by Stuart McFarlane	Secretary of the Department of the Treasury; 1948 – 1951	Succeeded by Roland Wilson
