= James Collins (public servant) =

Australian public servant

James Collins CMG CBE

Secretary of the Department of the Treasury
- In office 14 March 1916 – 26 June 1926

Personal details
- Born: James Richard Collins; 14 March 1869 Sebastopol, Victoria
- Died: 18 June 1934 (aged 65) London, England
- Spouse(s): Alice Ada, née Stephenson (m. 1891–1934; his death)
- Occupation: Public servant

James Richard Collins CMG CBE (14 March 1869 – 18 June 1934) was a senior Australian public servant, best known for his time as head of the Department of the Treasury

== Life and career ==
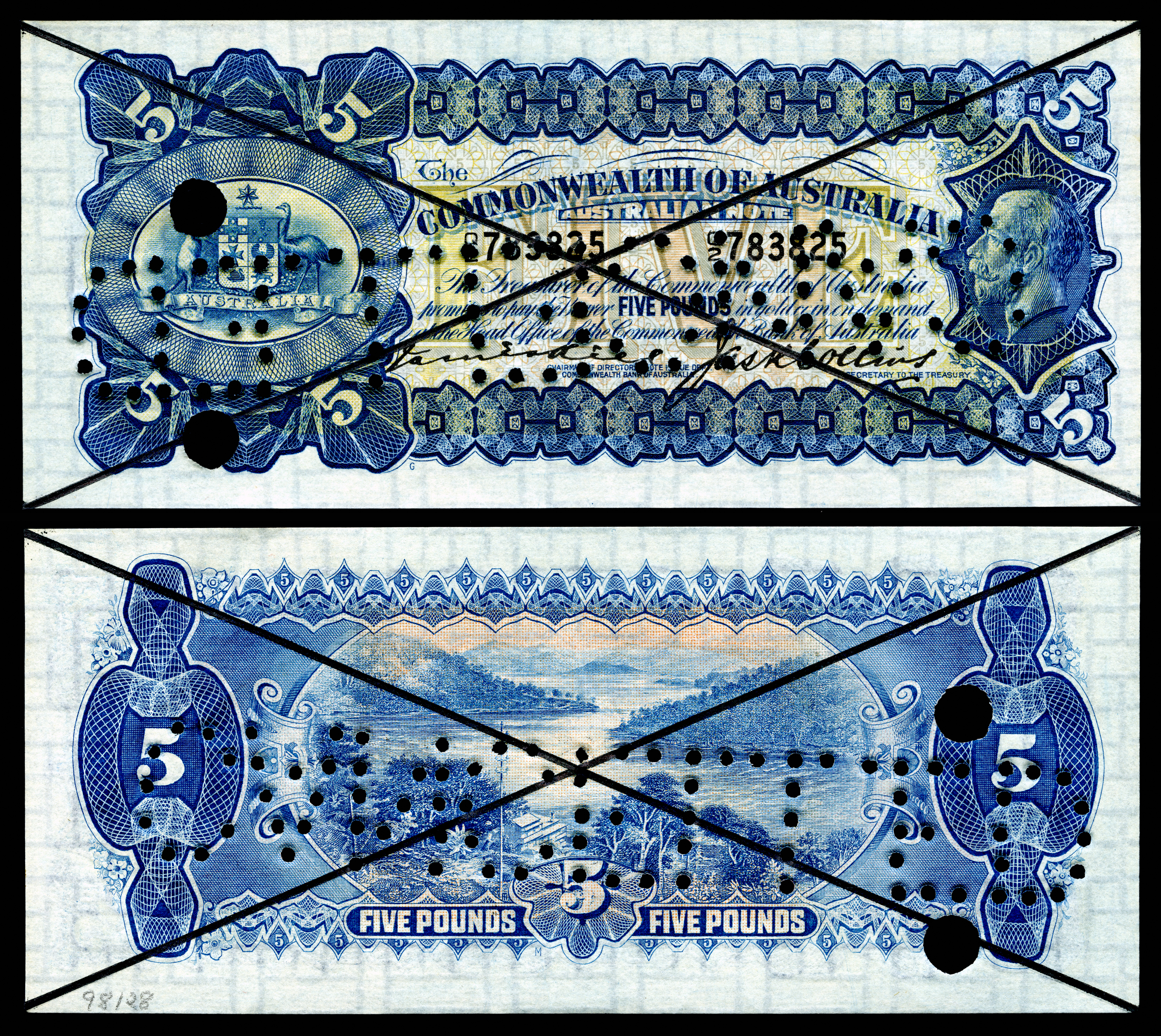
1924 Australian 5 pound banknote specimen signed by Collins

James Collins was born on 14 March 1869 in Sebastopol, Victoria.

Collins joined the Commonwealth Public Service in 1901, having before federation assisted to prepare the Victorian colonial budget in 1893 and in 1900 organising and running the first Victorian Old Age Pensions Office.

Between 1916 and 1926, Collins was the Secretary of the Australian Government Department of the Treasury. His official duties included a financial mission to London in 1920. That same year he also traveled to Brussels as the sole Australian delegate to the 1920 International Financial Conference.

In 1926, Collins was appointed financial advisor to the Australian Government in London. In 1931, he was the leader of the Australian delegation at the Assembly of the League of Nations. His delegation specialised in discussions on finance, economics and disarmaments.

Collins became seriously ill in December 1932, although he told media the following year that the seriousness of his illness had been exaggerated in statements which reached Australia. He announced his retirement in September 1933.

He died in London on 18 June 1934, while in the role of financial adviser in London to the Commonwealth.

== Awards ==
Collins was made a Companion of the Order of St Michael and St George in June 1920. In June 1923 he was created a Commander of the Order of the British Empire.

Government offices
Preceded by George Allen	Secretary of the Department of the Treasury; 1916 – 1926	Succeeded by James Heathershaw
