= James Heathershaw =

Australian public servant (1871-1943)

James Heathershaw CBE

Secretary of the Department of the Treasury
- In office 3 August 1926 – 28 April 1932

Personal details
- Born: James Thomas Heathershaw; 7 May 1871 Beaufort, Victoria
- Died: 25 July 1943 (aged 72) Oakleigh railway station, Melbourne, Victoria
- Resting place: Kew Cemetery
- Spouse(s): Rosa Ethel, née Rodway
- Occupation: Public servant

James Thomas Heathershaw CBE (7 May 1871 – 25 July 1943) was an Australian public servant and the third Secretary of the Department of the Treasury.

== Early life ==
Heathershaw was born on 7 May 1871 in Beaufort, Victoria. He was the twelfth child of Henry and Amelia Nancy (née Robilliard), and attended Flinders School in Geelong.

== Career ==
Heathershaw joined the Victorian Public Service in March 1889, transferring to the newly-formed Federal Treasury in 1902. In 1926, Heathershaw was appointed Secretary of the Treasury, becoming Australia's third Treasurer. He stood down from the role in 1932 due to poor health and went back to being Assistant Secretary in charge of pensions, compensation and insurance, before officially retiring in December 1935; he had even delayed his retirement date by some nine months to finish reorganising the Treasury's pensions department.

== Personal life and death ==
Heathershaw married Rosa Ethel Rodway at the Primitive Methodist Church in Carlton, on 7 March 1901; they had a son and a daughter. James Heathershaw spent his final years in Elwood, Melbourne, where he enjoyed golfing and gardening. He died on 25 July 1943, aged 72, at Oakleigh railway station. The cause of death was reportedly cardiovascular disease.

== Awards ==
In the 1927 Birthday Honours Heathershaw was created a Commander of the Order of the British Empire (CBE), while Secretary to the Treasury.

Government offices
Preceded by James Collins	Secretary of the Department of the Treasury; 1926 – 1932	Succeeded by Harry Sheehan
