= Treasury (Australia) =

Federal department of the Australian Government

The Treasury

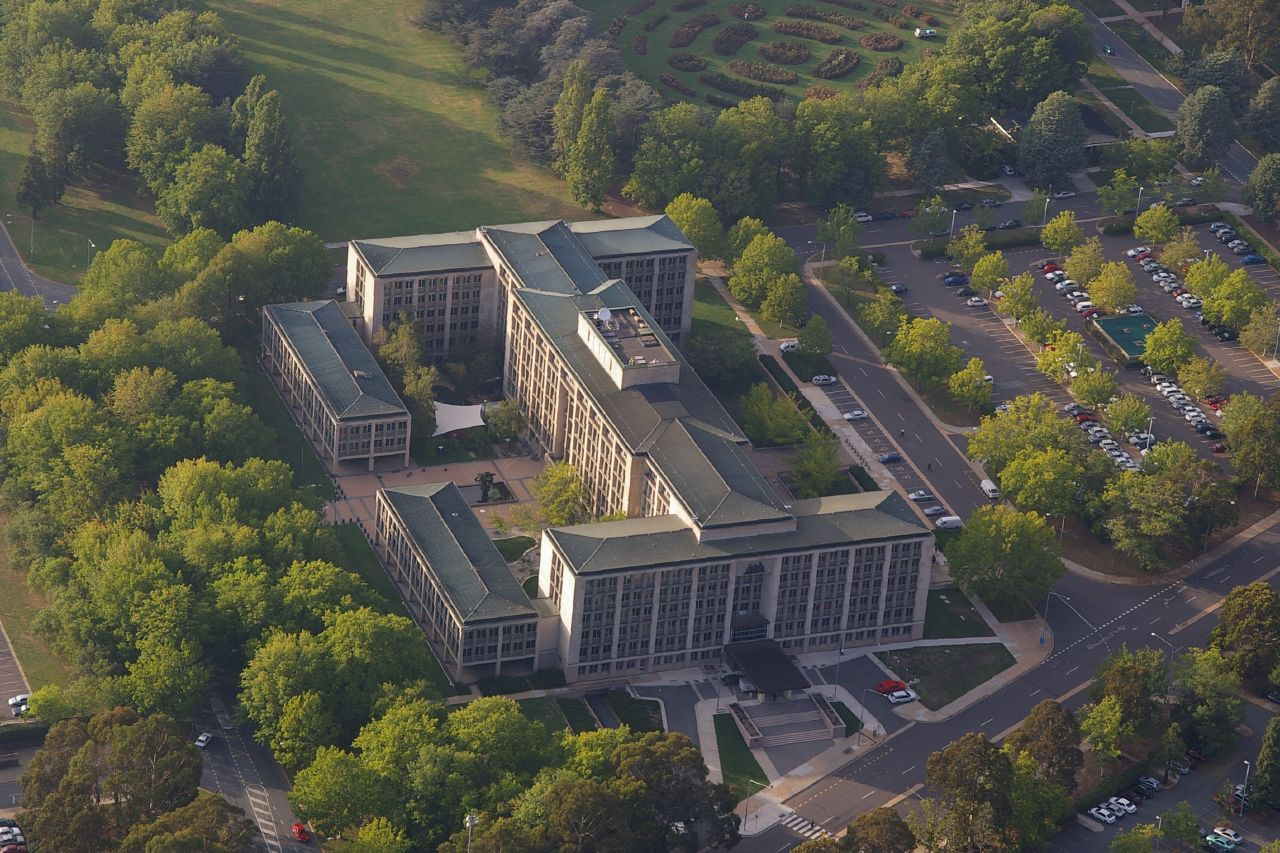
- The Treasury Building, Langton Crescent, Parkes, Canberra

Department overview
- Formed: January 1901; 125 years ago
- Jurisdiction: Australia
- Headquarters: Parkes, Canberra
- Employees: 1,466 (2023)
- Annual budget: $377 million (2022/23)
- Ministers responsible: Jim Chalmers, Treasurer; Clare O'Neil, Minister for Housing, Minister for Homelessness, Minister for Cities; Anne Aly, Minister for Small Business; Daniel Mulino, Assistant Treasurer, Minister for Financial Services
- Department executive: Jenny Wilkinson, Secretary
- Child department: See below
- Website: treasury.gov.au

The Department of the Treasury, also known as the Treasury, is the national treasury and financial department of the federal government of Australia. The treasury is responsible for executing economic and fiscal policy, market regulation and the delivery of the federal budget with the department overseeing 16 agencies. The Treasury is one of only two departments that have existed continuously since Federation in 1901, the other being the Department of the Attorney-General.

The most senior public servant in the Treasury is the department secretary, currently Jenny Wilkinson who was appointed in June 2025. Ministerial responsibility for the department lies with the Treasurer, currently Jim Chalmers who took office in the Albanese government in May 2022. Other ministers in the department are Clare O'Neil, who is the Minister for Housing, Minister for Homelessness and Minister for Cities; Anne Aly, who is the Minister for Small Business; and Daniel Mulino, the Assistant Treasurer and Minister for Financial Services. There is one assistant minister, Andrew Leigh, who is the Assistant Minister for Productivity, Competition, Charities and Treasury.

== History ==
The Australian Treasury was established in Melbourne in January 1901, after the federation of the six Australian colonies. In 1910, the federal government passed the Australian Notes Act 1910 which gave control over the issue of Australian bank notes to The Treasury and prohibited the circulation of state notes and withdrew their status as legal tender. The Treasury issued notes until 1924, when the responsibility was transferred to the Commonwealth Bank and later to Note Printing Australia, a subsidiary of the Reserve Bank of Australia.

The department is focused on developing Australian taxation system, land and income tax and economic policies.

== Operational activities ==
In an Administrative Arrangements Order made on 13 May 2025, the functions of the department were broadly classified into the following matters:

- Economic, fiscal and monetary policy
- Taxation
- Borrowing money on the public credit of the Commonwealth
- International finance
- Foreign exchange
- Financial sector policy
- Currency and legal tender
- Foreign investment in Australia
- Superannuation and retirement savings policy
- Business law and practice
- Corporate, financial services and securities law
- Corporate insolvency
- Competition and consumer policy
- Prices surveillance
- Excise
- Census and statistics
- Valuation services
- Commonwealth-State financial relations
- Consumer credit
- Housing, rental and homelessness policy
- Building and construction industry, excluding workplace relations
- Population policy
- Infrastructure and project financing
- Small business policy and programmes
- National policy on cities
- Land and planning policy
- Bankruptcy
- Personal property securities

== Structure ==
The Treasury is divided into five groups: fiscal, macroeconomic, revenue, Corporate and Foreign investment and markets, with support coming from the Corporate Services Division. These groups were established to meet four policy outcomes.

1. Effective government spending and taxation arrangements. The Treasury provides advice on budget policy issues, trends in Commonwealth revenue and major fiscal and financial aggregates, major expenditure programmes, taxation policy, retirement income, Commonwealth-State financial policy and actuarial services.
2. Sound macroeconomic environment. The Treasury monitors and assesses economic conditions and prospects, both in Australia and overseas, and provides advice on the formulation and implementation of effective macroeconomic policy.
3. Well functioning markets. The Treasury provides advice on policy processes and reforms that promote a secure financial system and sound corporate practices, remove impediments to competition in product and services markets and safeguard the public interest in matters such as consumer protection and foreign investment.
4. Effective taxation and retirement income arrangements. The Treasury provides advice and assists in the formulation and implementation of government taxation and retirement income policies and legislation as well as providing information on material changes to taxation revenue forecasts and projections.

== Agencies ==
As at October 2023, the Treasury oversaw 16 agencies.

- Auditing & Assurances Board
- Australian Accounting Standards Board
- Australian Bureau of Statistics
- Australian Office of Financial Management
- Australian Competition & Consumer Commission
- Australian Prudential Regulation Authority
- Australian Reinsurance Pool Corporation
- Australian Securities & Investments Commission
- Australian Taxation Office
- Commonwealth Grants Commission
- Housing Australia
- Inspector General of Taxation
- National Competition Council
- Productivity Commission
- Reserve Bank of Australia
- Royal Australian Mint

== Financial regulation ==
The department works with the Australian Prudential Regulation Authority, the Australian Securities & Investments Commission and the Reserve Bank of Australia via the Council of Financial Regulators Working Group to ensure that market operators have appropriate oversight and to facilitate crisis management if required.

== List of secretaries ==
The secretary to the Treasury is the public service head of the department. Below is the list of secretaries.

Order	Name	Term begin	Term end	Time in office
1	George Allen	1 January 1901	13 March 1916	15 years, 72 days
2	James Collins	14 March 1916	26 June 1926	10 years, 104 days
3	James Heathershaw	3 August 1926	28 April 1932	5 years, 269 days
4	Sir Harry Sheehan	29 April 1932	28 February 1938	5 years, 305 days
5	Stuart McFarlane	24 March 1938	29 January 1948	9 years, 311 days
6	George Watt	23 November 1948	31 March 1951	2 years, 128 days
7	Sir Roland Wilson	1 April 1951	27 October 1966	15 years, 209 days
8	Sir Richard Randall	28 October 1966	31 October 1971	5 years, 3 days
9	Sir Frederick Wheeler	1 November 1971	5 January 1979	7 years, 65 days
10	John Stone	8 January 1979	14 September 1984	5 years, 250 days
11	Bernie Fraser	19 September 1984	18 September 1989	4 years, 364 days
12	Chris Higgins	19 September 1989	6 December 1990	1 year, 78 days
13	Tony Cole	14 February 1991	23 March 1993	2 years, 37 days
14	Ted Evans	24 May 1993	26 April 2001	7 years, 335 days
15	Ken Henry	27 April 2001	4 March 2011	9 years, 311 days
16	Martin Parkinson	7 March 2011	12 December 2014	3 years, 280 days
17	John Fraser	15 January 2015	31 July 2018	3 years, 197 days
18	Philip Gaetjens	1 August 2018	2 September 2019	1 year, 32 days
19	Steven Kennedy	2 September 2019	16 June 2025	5 years, 287 days
20	Jenny Wilkinson	16 June 2025	Incumbent	1 year, 131 days

== Treasury’s independence ==
In 2008, Treasurer Wayne Swan called Secretary to the Treasury Ken Henry an "independent economic regulator," similar to the Governor of the Reserve Bank. When asked after the 2009 Budget about Treasury’s independence, Henry replied:

Strictly of course we're not. The Treasury Department is a department of state. It is part of the executive government. It works to the government of the day, whatever the political persuasion of the government of the day. And so in that sense of course the Treasury is not independent from government and it can never behave as if it is independent from government. But there's another sense in which it does have a degree of independence and that is that the Treasury conducts its analysis without government interference. It's up to the government of the day to decide whether to accept that analysis or whether to reject that analysis.

— Radio National, Tuesday, 19 May 2009

== Forecasts ==
The department is legally required to provide a Pre-election Economic and Fiscal Outlook containing updated reports on the economic and fiscal outlook shortly after the issuing of a writ for a general federal election.

== See also ==
- Henry Tax Review
- List of Australian Commonwealth Government entities
