= Roland Wilson (economist) =

Australian public servant and economist (1904–1996)

Sir Roland Wilson CBE

Secretary of the Department of Labour & National Service
- In office 14 November 1940 – 7 March 1946

Secretary of the Department of the Treasury
- In office 1 April 1951 – 27 October 1966

Commonwealth Statistician
- In office 1936-1940 – 1946- 1951
- Preceded by: Edward Tannock McPhee

Personal details
- Born: 7 April 1904 Ulverstone, Tasmania, Australia
- Died: 25 October 1996 (aged 92) Canberra, Australian Capital Territory
- Spouse: Valeska Thompson (m. 1930; died 1971) Joyce (m. 1975–1996)
- Education: University of Tasmania; University of Oxford; University of Chicago
- Occupation: Public servant

Sir Roland Wilson CBE (7 April 1904 – 25 October 1996) was a senior Australian public servant and economist.

== Life and career ==
Wilson was born in Ulverstone, Tasmania on 7 April 1904. He studied at Devonport High School, where he won a scholarship to take an economics course at the University of Tasmania. He became a Rhodes Scholar in 1925, the first Tasmanian from a state school to win the scholarship. The Rhodes Scholarship took him to the University of Oxford where he studied for the degree of doctor of philosophy.

Wilson became Commonwealth Statistician in 1936.

Wilson was appointed Secretary of the Department of Labour & National Service as a war-time secondment in 1940.

In 1946, after World War II, Wilson resumed his position as Commonwealth Statistician until the Menzies government made him Secretary of the Department of the Treasury in 1951.

On leaving Treasury in 1966, Wilson was the Chairman of Qantas until 1972, and the Chairman of the Commonwealth Bank until 1975.

== Awards and honours ==
He was appointed a Commander of the Order of the British Empire (CBE) in 1941 and knighted in 1955.

The Sir Roland Wilson Building at the Australian National University is named after Wilson, in recognition of his significant contribution to public policy and administration in Australia and in many international forums.

The Sir Roland Wilson Foundation at the Australian National University was established by a donation from the Wilson family in 1998, and offers scholarships to Australian public servants to undertake postgraduate studies.

Government offices
New title Department established	Secretary of the Department of Labour & National Service; 1940–1946	Succeeded by William Funnell
Preceded by George Watt	Secretary of the Department of the Treasury; 1951–1966	Succeeded by Dick Randall
Business positions
Preceded by Geoffrey Rushworth as Acting Chairman	Chairman of the Commonwealth Bank; 1966 – 1975	Succeeded by Finlay Crisp
