= Harry Sheehan =

Australian public servant and banker

Sir Harry Sheehan CBE

Secretary of the Department of the Treasury
- In office 29 April 1932 – 28 February 1938

Personal details
- Born: Henry John Sheehan; 27 December 1883 St Kilda, Melbourne
- Died: 26 March 1941 (aged 57) Sydney
- Spouse: Mabel Levenia Cust
- Occupation: Public servant

Sir Henry John Sheehan CBE (27 December 1883 – 26 March 1941) was a senior Australian public servant and banker. Sheehan is best known for his time as head of the Department of the Treasury and as Governor of the Commonwealth Bank.

== Life and career ==
Harry Sheehan was born in St Kilda, Melbourne on 27 December 1883.

Sheehan began his Commonwealth Public Service career in 1903 in the Department of the Treasury. Between 1932 and 1938, Sheehan was head of the department.

Sheehan died of cancer on 26 March 1941 in Sydney. A memorial service was held at St Stephen's Church.

== Awards ==
Sheehan was made a Commander of the Order of the British Empire while Assistant Secretary to the Treasury in the 1928 Birthday Honours. He was appointed a Knight Bachelor in February 1937 during his time as Secretary of the department.

Government offices
Preceded by James Heathershaw	Secretary of the Department of the Treasury; 1932 – 1938	Succeeded by Stuart McFarlane
