= George Allen (public servant) =

Australian public servant (1852–1940)

George Allen CMG ISO

Secretary of the Department of the Treasury
- In office 1 January 1901 – 13 March 1916

Personal details
- Born: 23 August 1852 Geelong, Victoria
- Died: 20 April 1940 (aged 87) Kew, Melbourne, Victoria
- Occupation: Public servant

George Thomas Allen CMG ISO (23 August 1852 – 20 April 1940) was a senior Australian public servant, one of the inaugural heads of departments in the Australian Public Service at Australia's federation.

== Life and career ==
George Allen was born on 23 August 1852 in Geelong, Victoria. He was educated at Flinders Street School.

Between 1901 and his retirement in 1916, Allen was the Secretary of the Department of the Treasury. In his first two years in the role, Allen only had 20 staff.

Allen died, never married, in his home in Kew, Melbourne, on 20 April 1940.

== Awards ==
In January 1913, Allen was made a Companion of the Order of St Michael and St George, while Secretary of the Australian Government Treasury.

Government offices
New title Department established	Secretary of the Department of the Treasury; 1901 – 1916	Succeeded by James Collins
