= Banknotes of the Australian dollar =

The notes of the Australian dollar were first issued by the Reserve Bank of Australia on 14 February 1966, when Australia changed to decimal currency and replaced the pound with the dollar. This currency was a lot easier for calculating compared to the previous Australian pound worth 20 shillings or 240 pence.

== First series (paper) ==
The $1 (10/-), $2 (£1), $10 (£5), and $20 (£10) had exact exchange rates with pounds and were a similar colour to the notes they replaced, but the $5 (worth £2 10s) did not, and was not introduced until May 1967 when the public had become more familiar with decimal currency. The original notes were designed by Gordon Andrews, who rejected traditional Australian clichés in favour of interesting and familiar subjects such as Aboriginal culture, women, the environment, architecture and aeronautics.

Notes issued between 1966 and 1973 bore the title "Commonwealth of Australia". Starting from 1974, the title on the new notes only read "Australia" and the legal tender phrase was also changed from "Legal Tender throughout the Commonwealth of Australia and the territories of the Commonwealth" to "This Australian Note is legal tender throughout Australia and its territories".

The $50 note was introduced in 1973 and the $100 note in 1984, in response to inflation requiring larger denominations for transactions. The $1 note was replaced by a $1 coin in 1984, while the $2 note was replaced by a smaller $2 coin in 1988. Although no longer printed, all previous notes of the Australian dollar are still considered legal tender.

Paper series (1966–1996)
Image		Value	Dimensions	colours	Description		Date of circulation
Front	Back	Value	Dimensions	colours	Front	Back	Date of circulation
		$1	140 × 70 mm (5.5 × 2.8 in)	Brown and orange	Queen Elizabeth II	David Malangi (artwork)	1966–1984
		$2	145 × 72.5 mm (5.71 × 2.85 in)	Green and yellow	John Macarthur	William Farrer	1966–1988
		$5	150 × 75 mm (5.9 × 3.0 in)	Mauve	Sir Joseph Banks	Caroline Chisholm	1967–1992
		$10	155 × 77.5 mm (6.10 × 3.05 in)	Blue and orange	Francis Greenway	Henry Lawson	1966–1993
		$20	160 × 80 mm (6.3 × 3.1 in)	Red and yellow (orange backset)	Sir Charles Kingsford Smith	Lawrence Hargrave	1966–1994
		$50	165 × 82.5 mm (6.50 × 3.25 in)	Yellow, blue, brown and green	Howard Florey, Baron Florey	Sir Ian Clunies Ross	1973–1995
		$100	172 × 82.5 mm (6.77 × 3.25 in)	Light blue and grey	Sir Douglas Mawson	John Tebbutt	1984–1996
These images are to scale at 0.7 pixel per millimetre (18 pixel per inch). For table standards, see the banknote specification table.
Remarks

== Polymer commemorative $10 note ==
In 1988, the Reserve Bank of Australia issued $10 notes in plastic. The polypropylene polymer banknotes were produced by Note Printing Australia, to commemorate the bicentenary of European settlement in Australia. These notes contained a transparent "window" with a diffractive optically variable device (DOVD) image of Captain James Cook as a security feature. Australian notes were the first in the world to use such features. All current Australian notes also contain microprinting for further security.

Polymer commemorative (1988)
Note	Obverse design	Reverse design	Dimensions (mm)	Weight (g)	Main colour	Window image	Embossing	Printed	Issued
$10	HMS Supply anchored at Sydney Cove	Australian Aboriginal culture and peoples	155 × 77.5 mm (6.10 × 3.05 in)		Green, orange and yellow	Captain Cook			26 Jan 1988
These images are to scale at 0.7 pixel per millimetre (18 pixel per inch). For table standards, see the banknote specification table.
Remarks

== Second series (polymer) ==
There were initial difficulties with the first polymer note issued; the $10 note had problems with the holographic security feature detaching from the note itself. However, the Reserve Bank saw potential in the issue of plastic notes and commenced preparations for an entirely new series made from polymer, commencing with the $5 note in 1992. Today all Australian notes are made of polymer. The Reserve Bank also changed the individuals depicted on the currency, becoming one of only five other countries in the world that depict a greater number of women than men on their banknotes.

In April 1995, the design of the $5 notes was updated to match the rest of the New Banknote Series, with additional slight changes in 1996. In 2001, a special commemorative 'Federation' $5 note was produced, but in 2002, the previous version's production commenced again. From 2002, the design of all notes (except for the $5 note picturing the Queen) was slightly changed to include the names of the people pictured on them under the portraits, and swapping the order of the signatures of officials on the notes.

Second series (1992–2016)
Note	Image		Obverse design	Reverse design	Dimensions^{4}	Weight^{4}	Main colour	Window image	Embossing^{5}	Printed	Issued
Note	Front	Back	Obverse design	Reverse design	Dimensions^{4}	Weight^{4}	Main colour	Window image	Embossing^{5}	Printed	Issued
$5 original^{1}			Queen Elizabeth II	Parliament House, Old Parliament House	130 × 65 × 0.1130 mm (5.1 × 2.6 × 0.00445 in)	0.764 g (0.0269 oz)	Pale mauve	Gum flower	—N/a	1992–1993	7 Jul 1992
$5 recoloured			Queen Elizabeth II	Parliament House, Old Parliament House	130 × 65 × 0.1256 mm (5.1 × 2.6 × 0.00494 in)	0.783 g (0.0276 oz)	Violet, pink	Gum flower	—N/a	1995–2015	24 April 1995
$5 Federation^{2}			Sir Henry Parkes	Catherine Helen Spence	130 × 65 × 0.1259 mm (5.1 × 2.6 × 0.00496 in)	0.815 g (0.0287 oz)	Violet, pink	Leaf-shaped window	"5"	1 Jan 2001	
$10^{3}			Banjo Paterson	Dame Mary Gilmore	137 × 65 × 0.1294 mm (5.4 × 2.6 × 0.00509 in)	0.841 g (0.0297 oz)	Blue	Windmill	Wavy lines	1993–2015	1 Nov 1993
$20			Mary Reibey	Reverend John Flynn	144 × 65 × 0.1332 mm (5.7 × 2.6 × 0.00524 in)	0.900 g (0.0317 oz)	Red/Orange	Compass	"20"	1994–2013	31 Oct 1994
$50			David Unaipon	Edith Cowan	151 × 65 × 0.1400 mm (5.9 × 2.6 × 0.00551 in)	0.955 g (0.0337 oz)	Yellow	Southern Cross	"50"	1995–2016	4 Oct 1995
$100			Dame Nellie Melba	Sir John Monash	158 × 65 × 0.1408 mm (6.2 × 2.6 × 0.00554 in)	1.006 g (0.0355 oz)	Green	Lyrebird	"100"	1996–2017	15 May 1996
Remarks: 1. Some members of the public had difficulties in differentiating between the $5 and $10 notes especially in poor light conditions.; 2. Commemorating the Centenary of Federation. It also features the text of the speech Henry Parkes gave to parliament in favour of federation in microprint, on the side featuring his face.; 3. This note features excerpts of text from Banjo Paterson's most famous poem The Man From Snowy River intertwined with the text "TEN DOLLARS" in microprint on the front, and the text of Mary Gilmore's patriotic poem No Foe Shall Gather Our Harvest on the reverse.; 4. Thickness and weight of notes is ±5% per 1000 notes 5. Embossing is inside the shiny, transparent window.

== Third series (polymer) ==
On 13 February 2015 the Reserve Bank of Australia announced that the next series of Australia notes would have a tactile feature to help the visually impaired community to tell the value of the note after a successful campaign led by 15-year-old Connor McLeod, who is blind, to introduce the new feature. The notes retain the key aspects of the previous series' design such as the colour, size and people portrayed for ease of recognition and to minimise disruption to businesses.

The new $5 note includes the tactile feature and was issued on 1 September 2016, to coincide with Australia's National Wattle Day, followed by the new $10 banknote on 20 September 2017. The new $50 note was released for circulation on 18 October 2018, followed by the new $20 note on 9 October 2019, and the new $100 was released on 29 October 2020. The Reserve Bank currently has no plans to release fourth series notes in denominations higher than $100, despite the amount of inflation that has occurred since the $100 note was introduced in 1984.

In May 2019 the Reserve Bank confirmed that the $50 note contained a misspelling of the word "responsibility" on the reverse design, a typo that would be corrected in future printings.

It was announced on 2 February 2023 that the new $5 note would not feature Charles III, but rather an Indigenous design. Treasurer Jim Chalmers said, "The monarch will still be on the coins, but the $5 note will say more about our history and our heritage and our country, and I see that as a good thing."

Next Generation Banknote (NGB) series (2016–present)
Value	Image		Design		Dimensions^{1}	Weight^{1}	Main colour	Window image	Embossing^{3}	Printed	Issued
Value	Front	Back	Front	Back	Dimensions^{1}	Weight^{1}	Main colour	Window image	Embossing^{3}	Printed	Issued
$5			Queen Elizabeth II	Parliament House^{4}	130 × 65 mm (5.1 × 2.6 in)	unknown	Purple	Top to Bottom window^{2}	Federation star	Currently printing	1 September 2016
$10			Banjo Paterson	Dame Mary Gilmore	137 × 65 mm (5.4 × 2.6 in)	unknown	Blue	Top to Bottom window^{2}	Pen nib	Currently printing	20 September 2017
$20			Mary Reibey	Reverend John Flynn	144 × 65 mm (5.7 × 2.6 in)	0.82 g (0.029 oz)	Red	Top to Bottom window^{2}	Compass	Currently printing	9 October 2019
$50			David Unaipon	Edith Cowan	151 × 65 mm (5.9 × 2.6 in)	unknown	Yellow	Top to Bottom window^{2}	Book	Currently printing	18 October 2018
$100			Dame Nellie Melba	Sir John Monash	158 × 65 mm (6.2 × 2.6 in)	unknown	Green	Top to Bottom window^{2}	Fan	Currently printing	29 October 2020
These images are to scale at 0.7 pixel per millimetre (18 pixel per inch). For table standards, see the banknote specification table. Source: Reserve Bank of Australia.
Remarks: 1. Thickness and weight of notes is ±5% per 1000 notes 2. A new clear polymer window that goes from the top to the bottom of the note that is all clear 3. Embossing is inside the small window.; 4. There are two blocks of micro-text on the reverse side of the Fourth series five dollar note, which contains excerpts of the Constitution of Australia

== See also ==
- Coins of Australia
- List of people who have appeared on Australian currency
- Banknotes of the Canadian dollar
- Banknotes of the New Zealand dollar
