= Gordon Andrews =

Gordon Andrews may refer to:

- Gordon Andrews (footballer) (1934–2021), Australian footballer
- Gordon Andrews (industrial designer) (1914–2001), Australian artist
