= $2 =

$2 primarily refers to banknotes, bills or coins, including:

== Currency ==
- Australian two dollar coin, which replaced
  - Australian 2 dollar note
- Toonie, the Canadian two-dollar coin, which replaced
  - Canadian two-dollar bill
- United States two-dollar bill, a current denomination of U.S. currency
- Hong Kong two-dollar coin, the third-highest denomination coin of the Hong Kong dollar
- New Zealand two-dollar coin, which replaced the two-dollar banknote

Other currencies with $2 banknotes, bills or coins are:

- Bahamian dollar
- Barbadian dollar
- Belize dollar
- Bermudian dollar
- Cook Islands dollar
- Fijian dollar
- Samoan tālā
- Singapore dollar
- Solomon Islands dollar
- Tuvaluan dollar
- Tongan paʻanga
- Argentine peso
- Mexican peso
- Uruguayan peso
- Brazilian real

== Other uses ==
- $2, a formal parameter in some programming languages
