= Coins of Australia =

Australian currency

The coins of Australia include the coins of the current Australian dollar and those of other currencies historically used in the country. During the early days of the colonies that formed Australia, foreign as well as British currency was used, but in 1910, a decade after federation, Australian coins were introduced. Australia used pounds, shillings and pence until 1966, when it adopted the decimal system with the Australian dollar divided into 100 cents.

== First coins ==
For many years after the first Australian colony, New South Wales (NSW), was founded in 1788, it did not have its own currency and had to rely on the coins of other countries. During the early days of the colony, commodities such as wheat were sometimes used as a currency because of the shortage of coins. Also, many transactions were carried out using promissory notes, or a barter system that included trading for alcohol known as 'rum currency', a system disbanded when Macquarie became governor on 1 January 1810.

Spanish dollars were sometimes cut into quarters, and the resulting pieces cut again into 2/3 and 1/3 segments, with the 2/3 segments (1/6 of the original coin) being treated as "shillings" and the 1/3 segments (1/12 of the original coin) "sixpences". In 1791, Governor Phillip of New South Wales fixed the value of the Spanish dollar to equal five shillings.

Under the decree of 19 November 1800 by governor Philip Gidley King, the following eleven coins were legal tender for the exchange value of:

- Gold Johanna (Portuguese coin worth 12800 Reis) = £4/0/ – (four pounds)
- Gold Half Johanna (Portuguese coin worth 6400 Reis) = £2/0/ – (two pounds)
- Guinea = £1/2/ – (one pound and two shillings)
- Gold Mohur = £1/17/6 – (one pound, 17 shillings and 6 pence)
- Spanish dollar = 5 shillings
- Ducat = 9/6 – (9 shillings and 6 pence)
- Rupee = 2/6 – (2 shillings and 6 pence)
- Pagoda = 8/ – (8 shillings)
- Dutch Guilder = 2/ – (2 shillings)
- English shilling = 1/1 – (1 shilling and 1 penny)
- Copper coin of 1 oz = 2 pence

The settlers did have some George III one-penny coins, which were referred to as "Cartwheel pennies". These were the first British coins to be officially exported to the Australian colonies, and so can be considered Australia's first official coins. They were dated 1797 and 1799, with Britannia on one side and King George III on the other.

In 1812, Governor Lachlan Macquarie of New South Wales bought Spanish dollar coins, following the arrival of the ship Samarang at Port Jackson with 40,000 Spanish dollars, paying four shillings and nine pence for each dollar. He was worried that the coins would quickly be exported out of the colony, and he had holes cut in the middle of them to try to keep them in Australia. These were known as holey dollars (valued at five shillings), with the piece from the middle being called the dump (valued at around 15 pence). Both were declared legal currency on 30 September 1813 and went into circulation in 1814.

British currency became the official currency of the Australian colonies after 1825, with almost £100,000 worth of British coins being imported during 1824–25. The holey dollar was no longer legal tender after 1829. The most notable holey dollar was the "Hannibal Head", a one of a kind coin that features the portrait of King Joseph I of Spain. The Hannibal Head sold at auction in 2018 to a private collector for $500,000.

== Gold coins and sovereigns ==
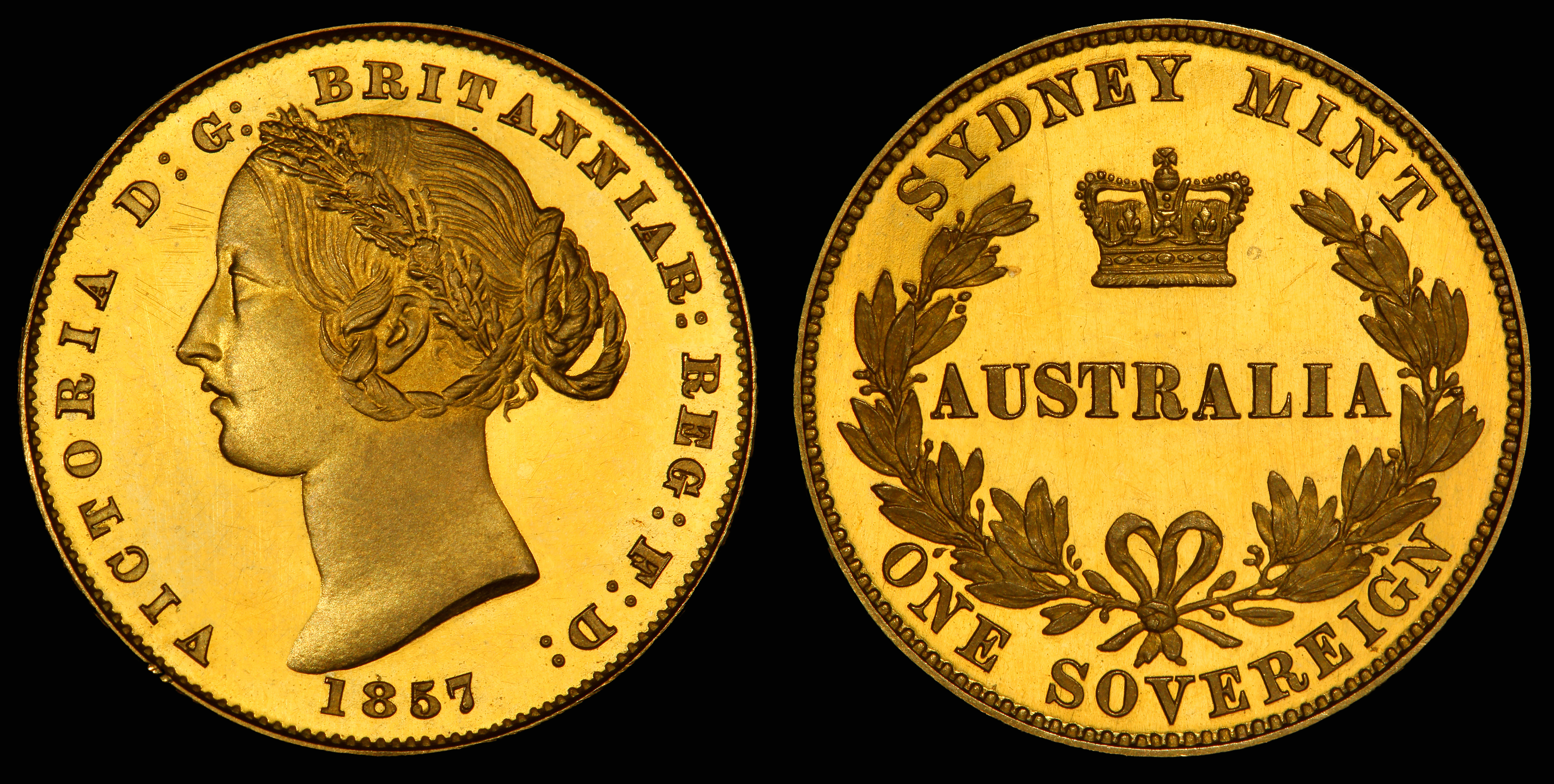
Australia 1857 sovereign (proof)

Unofficial gold coins were used during the gold rush of the 1850s. Traders' tokens were also used because of the shortage of coins caused by the large increase in population. Requests to make gold coins in Adelaide in 1852 to compensate for the shortage of coins were rejected by Britain after 25,000 one-pound pieces were struck.

Australia's first official mint was in Sydney, founded in 1855. It produced gold coins with an original design between 1855 and 1870, with "Sydney Mint, Australia, One Sovereign" on one side and Queen Victoria on the other, or "Sydney Mint, Australia, Half Sovereign", before starting in 1870 to mint gold coins of British design. One gold sovereign equalled £1.

== The pound ==
Federation in 1901 gave the Commonwealth a constitutional power to issue coins and removed this power from the States. British coins continued in use until 1910, when Australian silver coins were introduced. These included florins, shillings, sixpences and threepences. They had a portrait of King Edward VII on one side. Australian pennies and half-pennies were introduced into circulation the following year. In 1931, gold sovereigns stopped being minted in Australia. A crown or five-shilling coin was minted in 1937 and 1938.

== The dollar ==
'Design of the new decimal currency' first broadcast by the ABC in 1964

The Australian dollar replaced the Australian pound on 14 February 1966 as part of the decimalisation process. At this time, 1, 2, 5, 10, 20, and 50 cent coins were issued. $1 coins were first issued in 1984, and $2 coins soon followed in 1988. The one- and two-cent coins were discontinued in 1990 and withdrawn from circulation in February 1992.

== See also ==
- List of people who have appeared on Australian currency
- Banknotes of the Australian dollar
- Banknotes of the Australian pound
