= Donald McAlpine =

Australian cinematographer

- Born: April 13, 1934; Quandialla, New South Wales, Australia
- Years active: 1972–present

Donald M. McAlpine ACS, ASC is an Australian cinematographer.

== Early life and education ==
Donald McAlpine was born in Quandialla, New South Wales.

== Career ==
McAlpine was a physical education teacher in Parkes, New South Wales, Australia. He began using a 16mm camera to film athletes preparing for the Melbourne Olympic Games.

In 1962 he resigned from his teaching job and joined ABC Television as a camera assistant, and was promoted to cameraman in 1965. In 1968 he left the ABC to take up a position at the Commonwealth Film Unit (later Film Australia). There, he started to learn that there was art in cinematography and filmmaking, and was soon promoted to chief cameraman.

In Australia, from 1972 to 1981, McAlpine collaborated with Bruce Beresford. In 1974 he left Film Australia to work as a freelance DOP. McAlpine filmed many of Beresford's early films, including The Adventures of Barry McKenzie, Barry McKenzie Holds His Own, Don's Party, The Getting of Wisdom, Money Movers, Breaker Morant and The Club. McAlpine also worked with director Gillian Armstrong on My Brilliant Career.

Paul Mazursky offered McAlpine work on the film Tempest, released in 1982, and after that, his career took off. In 90s he worked with Chris Columbus in many movies, as Mrs Doubtfire.

== Recognition and awards ==
McAlpine is a member of both the Australian Cinematographers Society (ASC) and the American Society of Cinematographers. In 1997, the ASC inducted him into its hall of fame, and in 2009 honoured him with its International Achievement Award.

In 2001, he was awarded the Australian Centenary Medal for his service to Australian society and Australian film production. In the same year, he was nominated for an Academy Award for his work in Moulin Rouge!.

In 2011, he was honoured with the AACTA Lifetime Achievement Award, the Longford Lyell Award.

In 2016 McAlpine received an honorary doctorate in arts from Edith Cowan University in Perth, Western Australia.

In October 2024, he received the Adelaide Film Festival's Don Dunstan Award.

== Filmography ==
=== Feature film ===
Year	Title	Director	Notes
1972	The Adventures of Barry McKenzie	Bruce Beresford	
1972	Gentle Strangers	Cecil Holmes	With Kerry Brown, Bruce Hillyard, David Sanderson and Mick von Bornemann
1974	Barry McKenzie Holds His Own	Bruce Beresford	
1976	Surrender in Paradise	Peter Cox	Also made a cameo as "Raw Meat"
1976	Don's Party	Bruce Beresford	
1978	The Getting of Wisdom	Bruce Beresford	
1978	Patrick	Richard Franklin	
1978	Money Movers	Bruce Beresford	
1979	The Odd Angry Shot	Tom Jeffrey	
1979	My Brilliant Career	Gillian Armstrong	
1979	The Journalist	Michael Thornhill	
1980	Breaker Morant	Bruce Beresford	
1980	The Earthling	Peter Collinson	
1980	The Club	Bruce Beresford	
1981	Puberty Blues	Bruce Beresford	
1982	Don't Cry, It's Only Thunder	Peter Werner	
1982	Tempest	Paul Mazursky	
1983	Now and Forever	Adriane Carr	
1983	Blue Skies Again	Richard Michaels	
1984	Harry & Son	Paul Newman	
1984	Moscow on the Hudson	Paul Mazursky	
1985	King David	Bruce Beresford	
1985	My Man Adam	Roger L. Simon	
1986	Down and Out in Beverly Hills	Paul Mazursky	
1986	The Fringe Dwellers	Bruce Beresford	
1987	Predator	John McTiernan	
1987	Orphans	Alan J. Pakula	
1988	Moving	Alan Metter	
1988	Moon over Parador	Paul Mazursky	
1989	See You in the Morning	Alan J. Pakula	
1989	Parenthood	Ron Howard	
1990	Stanley & Iris	Martin Ritt	
1991	The Hard Way	John Badham	With Robert Primes
1991	Career Opportunities	Bryan Gordon	
1992	Medicine Man	John McTiernan	
1992	Patriot Games	Phillip Noyce	
1993	The Man Without a Face	Mel Gibson	
1993	Mrs. Doubtfire	Chris Columbus	
1994	Clear and Present Danger	Phillip Noyce	
1995	Nine Months	Chris Columbus	
1996	Romeo + Juliet	Baz Luhrmann	
1997	The Edge	Lee Tamahori	
1998	Stepmom	Chris Columbus	
2001	Moulin Rouge!	Baz Luhrmann	
2002	The Time Machine	Simon Wells	
2003	Anger Management	Peter Segal	
2003	Peter Pan	P. J. Hogan	
2005	The Chronicles of Narnia: The Lion, the Witch and the Wardrobe	Andrew Adamson	
2009	X-Men Origins: Wolverine	Gavin Hood	
2010	Main Street	John Doyle	
2012	Ek Main Aur Ekk Tu	Shakun Batra	With David MacDonald
2012	Mental	P. J. Hogan	
2013	Ender's Game	Gavin Hood	
2015	The Dressmaker	Jocelyn Moorhouse	
2016	Kapoor & Sons	Shakun Batra	With Jeffery F. Bierman
2017	Ali's Wedding	Jeffrey Walker	
2018	Rajma Chawal	Leena Yadav	
2022	A Stitch in Time	Sasha Hadden	Also credited as executive producer
2022	Black Site	Sophia Banks	
2023	The Portable Door	Jeffrey Walker	

=== Television ===
TV movies

Year	Title	Director	Notes
1980	The Children of An Lac	John Llewellyn Moxey	
2009	Mega Piranha	Eric Forsberg; Stuart Gillard	With Bryan Olinger

TV series

Year	Title	Director	Notes
2019	Lambs of God	Jeffrey Walker	Episode "The Devil into Paradise"
2022	Savage River	Jocelyn Moorhouse	Miniseries

== Awards and nominations ==
Year	Award	Category	Title	Result
2001	Academy Awards	Best Cinematography	Moulin Rouge!	Nominated
2001	BAFTA Awards	Best Cinematography	Moulin Rouge!	Nominated
1979	Australian Academy of Cinema and Television Arts	Best Cinematography	My Brilliant Career	Won
1980	Australian Academy of Cinema and Television Arts	Best Cinematography	Breaker Morant	Won
2001	Australian Academy of Cinema and Television Arts	Best Cinematography	Moulin Rouge!	Won
1996	Satellite Awards	Best Cinematography	Romeo + Juliet	Nominated
2001	Satellite Awards	Best Cinematography	Moulin Rouge!	Nominated
