= Two dollar bill =

Two dollar bill may refer to:

- Australian two-dollar note
- Canadian two-dollar bill
- United States two-dollar bill
