= List of people who have appeared on Australian currency =

This is a list of people who have appeared on currency issued by Australia since that country introduced its own notes and coins in 1910.

Those appearing on the current series are shown in bold.

Legend:

- N = note
- C = coin
- P = primary image
- W = watermark
- /- = shilling
- d = pence
- c = cents

Name	Denomination(s)	N/C	P/W	Years	Notes
**Edith Cowan** MBE	**$50**	N	P	1995+	
**Rev John Flynn**, OBE	**$20**	N	P	1994+	
**Dame Mary Gilmore**, DBE	**$10**	N	P	1993+	
**Dame Nellie Melba**, GBE	**$100**	N	P	1996+	
General **Sir John Monash**, GCMG, KCB, VD	**$100**	N	P	1996+	
**Banjo Paterson**, OBE	**$10**	N	P	1993+	
**Mary Reibey**	**$20**	N	P	1994+	
**David Unaipon**	**$50**	N	P	1995+	
**Gwoya Jungarai (Tjungurrayi)**	$2	C	P	1988+	The portrait on the $2 coin is intended as an archetype of an Aboriginal elder; it is based on Ainslie Roberts' drawing of Gwoya Tjungurrayi, a Warlpiri-Anmatyerre man of the Northern Territory.
**Queen Elizabeth II**	½d, 1d, 3d, 6d, 1/-, 2/-	C	P	1953–63	
**Queen Elizabeth II**	£1	N	P	1953–66	
**Queen Elizabeth II**	$1	N	P	1966–82	
**Queen Elizabeth II**	1c, 2c	C	P	1966–91	
**Queen Elizabeth II**	5c, 10c, 20c, 50c	C	P	1966–2023	
**Queen Elizabeth II**	$1	C	P	1984–2022	
**Queen Elizabeth II**	$2	C	P	1988–2023	
**Queen Elizabeth II**	**$5**	N	P	1992+	
Sir Joseph Banks, Bt, GCB	$5	N	P	1967–91	
George Bass	50c	C	P	1998	Joint commemorative issue to celebrate his voyages with Matthew Flinders
Sir Donald Bradman, AC	20c	C	P	2001	Commemorative coin issued after his death
Prince William, Duke of Cambridge and Catherine, Duchess of Cambridge	20c	C	P	2011	Joint commemorative issue to celebrate their wedding.
Prince William, Duke of Cambridge and Catherine, Duchess of Cambridge	50c	C	P	2011	Joint commemorative issue to celebrate their wedding.
Charles, Prince of Wales	50c	C	P	1981	Joint commemorative issue to celebrate his engagement to Lady Diana Spencer
Caroline Chisholm	$5	N	P	1967–91	
Sir Ian Clunies Ross, CMG	$50	N	P	1974–95	
Captain James Cook, RN	£1	N	P	1923–32	
Captain James Cook, RN	£10	N	W	1934–66	
Captain James Cook, RN	£1	N	W	1938–66	George VI note 1938-53; Elizabeth II note 1953-1966
Captain James Cook, RN	£5	N	W	1939–53	
Captain James Cook, RN	10/-	N	W	1939–66	
Captain James Cook, RN	$1	N	W	1966–82	
Captain James Cook, RN	$2	N	W	1966–85	
Captain James Cook, RN	$10	N	W	1966–91	
Captain James Cook, RN	$20	N	W	1966–93	
Captain James Cook, RN	$5	N	W	1967–91	
Captain James Cook, RN	50c	C	P	1970	Commemorative coin to celebrate the bicentenary of Cook's discovery of the east coast of the continent
Captain James Cook, RN	$50	N	W	1974–93	
Captain James Cook, RN	$100	N	W	1984–91	
Captain James Cook, RN	$10	N	W	1988	Bicentennial issue.
Lieutenant Colonel Sir Edward "Weary" Dunlop, AC, CMG, OBE	50c	C	P	1995	Commemorative issue to celebrate the 50th anniversary of the end of World War II
King Edward VII	3d, 6d, 1/-, 2/-	C	P	1910	
King Edward VIII	£1	N	W	1933–38	The watermark was first used when he was the Prince of Wales. The primary image was that of the reigning monarch, his father, George V. These notes continued in use throughout his own short-lived reign as King Edward VIII (January–December 1936), and after his abdication. In 1938/39, the primary image was changed to George VI and the watermark was changed to James Cook.
King Edward VIII	10/-	N	W	1933–39	The watermark was first used when he was the Prince of Wales. The primary image was that of the reigning monarch, his father, George V. These notes continued in use throughout his own short-lived reign as King Edward VIII (January–December 1936), and after his abdication. In 1938/39, the primary image was changed to George VI and the watermark was changed to James Cook.
King Edward VIII	£5	N	W	1933–38	The watermark was first used when he was the Prince of Wales. The primary image was that of the reigning monarch, his father, George V. These notes continued in use throughout his own short-lived reign as King Edward VIII (January–December 1936), and after his abdication. In 1938/39, the primary image was changed to George VI and the watermark was changed to James Cook.
William Farrer	$2	N	P	1966–85	
Captain Matthew Flinders, RN	10/-	N	P	1953–66	
Captain Matthew Flinders, RN	50c	C	P	1998	Joint commemorative issue to celebrate his voyages with George Bass
Howard Florey, Baron Florey, OM	$50	N	P	1974–93	
Howard Florey, Baron Florey, OM	$1	C	P	1998	Centenary of his birth; uncirculated
Rear Admiral Sir John Franklin, KCH, RN	£5	N	P	1954–66	His image replaced that of King George VI.
King George V	½d, 1d, 3d, 6d, 1/-, 2/-	C	P	1911–36	
King George V	£1	N	P	1923–38	
King George V	10/-	N	P	1923–39	
King George V	£5	N	P	1924–38	
King George V	£10	N	P	1927–39	
King George VI	Crown (5/-)	C	P	1937–38	
King George VI	½d, 1d, 3d, 6d, 1/-, 2/-	C	P	1938–52	
King George VI	£1	N	P	1938–53	
King George VI	10/-	N	P	1939–53	
King George VI	£5	N	P	1939–53	On his death, his image was replaced by that of Sir John Franklin.
King George VI	£10	N	P	1940–53	On his death, his image was replaced by that of Arthur Phillip.
King George VI	5/-	N	P		Uncirculated
Francis Greenway	$10	N	P	1966–91	Only convicted forger to appear on legal tender
Lawrence Hargrave	$20	N	P	1966–93	
Hamilton Hume	£1	N	P	1953–66	
Air Commodore Sir Charles Kingsford Smith, MC, AFC	$20	N	P	1966–93	
Air Commodore Sir Charles Kingsford Smith, MC, AFC	$1	C	P	1997	Centenary of his birth (two versions, one uncirculated).
Henry Lawson	$10	N	P	1966–91	
Norman Lindsay	$1	C	P	2007	Commemorative coin, uncirculated.
John Macarthur	$2	N	P	1966-85	
Saint Mary of the Cross	$1	C	P	2008	Commemorative coin, uncirculated.
Sir Douglas Mawson, OBE	$100	N	P	1984–91	
Charles III of Spain Charles III of Spain Ferdinand VII of Spain Charles IV of Spain	5/- Holey Dollar	N	P	1954–65	Karina Nartiss, a young Latvian immigrant to Australia, was paid £10/10/- to model as a representation of "Science and Industry" on the £10 note.
Sir Henry Parkes, GCMG	$1	C	P	1996	Centenary of Parkes' death.
Sir Henry Parkes, GCMG	$5	N	P	2001	Centenary of Federation special issue
Admiral Arthur Phillip, RN	£10	N	P	1954-66	Replaced the image of King George VI
Catherine Helen Spence	$5	N	P	2001	Centenary of Federation commemorative issue
Captain Charles Sturt	£1	N	P	1953–66	
John Tebbutt	$100	N	P	1984–96	
Diana, Princess of Wales	50c	C	P	1981	As Lady Diana Spencer; joint commemorative issue to celebrate her engagement to Charles, Prince of Wales
Diana, Princess of Wales	$25	C	P	1992	Commemorative coin set to celebrate The Queen's Ruby Jubilee, the 40th anniversary of her accession. Titled 'The Royal Ladies', it consists of four proof coins. The reverses portray The Queen Mother, The Princess of Wales, The Princess Royal and The Princess Margaret. The set also includes a medallion.
Queen Elizabeth The Queen Mother	$25	C	P	1992	Commemorative coin set to celebrate The Queen's Ruby Jubilee, the 40th anniversary of her accession. Titled 'The Royal Ladies', it consists of four proof coins. The reverses portray The Queen Mother, The Princess of Wales, The Princess Royal and The Princess Margaret. The set also includes a medallion.
Anne, Princess Royal	$25	C	P	1992	Commemorative coin set to celebrate The Queen's Ruby Jubilee, the 40th anniversary of her accession. Titled 'The Royal Ladies', it consists of four proof coins. The reverses portray The Queen Mother, The Princess of Wales, The Princess Royal and The Princess Margaret. The set also includes a medallion.
Princess Margaret, Countess of Snowdon	$25	C	P	1992	Commemorative coin set to celebrate The Queen's Ruby Jubilee, the 40th anniversary of her accession. Titled 'The Royal Ladies', it consists of four proof coins. The reverses portray The Queen Mother, The Princess of Wales, The Princess Royal and The Princess Margaret. The set also includes a medallion.
**King Charles III**	**$1**	C	P	2023+	
