= Alan Adler (photo booth owner) =

Australian photo booth owner

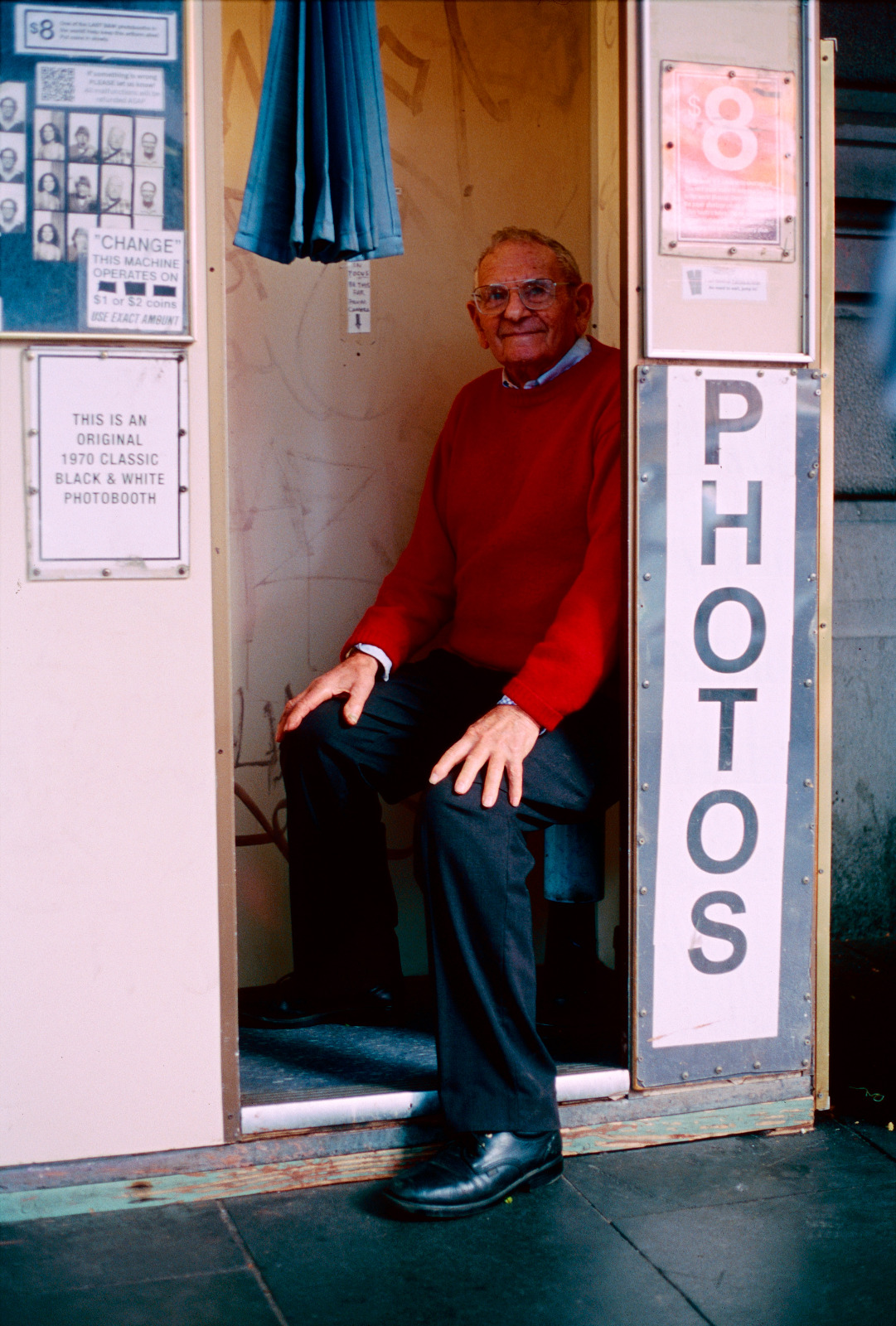
- Adler at the Flinders Street Station photo booth (2024)
- Born: 30 May 1932
- Died: 18 December 2024 (aged 92)
- Years active: 1972–2022
- Known for: Photo booths in Melbourne, self-portraits

Alan Adler (30 May 1932 – 18 December 2024) was an Australian man who owned 16 photo booths across Melbourne, Australia. Over his career, he took photographs of himself each time he fixed and serviced the booths for over 50 years, keeping thousands of the test strips in his home, though he did not consider himself a photographer.

By the year of his retirement in 2022, only one of his booths remained, at Flinders Street railway station; the operation of this booth and the potential restoration of the rest was taken over by Christopher Sutherland and Jessie Norman under the name Metro-Auto-Photo. Adler's work has been celebrated by a book and exhibition, both by the same name of Auto-Photo: A Life in Portraits.

== Early life ==
Adler was born on 30 May 1932. He disliked photography in school, "because it was in the dark all the time".

== Career ==
In 1972, at age 40, Adler was a motor mechanic by trade. He owned a small self-serving grocery store on Burwood Road in Hawthorn, Victoria, previously his father's, which was performing poorly due to a large supermarket across the street. That year, after seeing "vending machines" advertised in The Age, promising him $80 a week if he ran them, Adler decided to buy two photo booths. Before this, he had not seen a photo booth before. He experienced issues in their first day of operation, as "there was trouble because the thermostat played up and the developer got very hot", causing the photos to come out of the machine white. The seller adjusted the thermostat, fixing the issue; Adler said this was his only lesson in how the machines worked. He set up a photo booth at Flinders Street Station in 1974.

While operating a peak of 16 photo booths around the city, which were located as far out as Dandenong, Adler's work days lasted from 7.30 am to any time up to 9 pm, and included refilling papers and chemicals, performing fixes of overheated capacitors and broken cameras, replacing gearboxes, and cleaning up and fixing vandalism. He spent hours driving around the city and suburbs of Melbourne to do so. His work also involved harm prevention, such as suspending the relay boxes so they swung when attacked and adding rubber stops to protect the light chutes from the doors if they were kicked open. At one point, Adler bought six or seven Prontophot booths; these booths took colour photos, though this colour faded over time.

The inception of the Australian one-dollar coin, according to Adler, led to him beginning to make a profit; before this, he had charged 80c through four 20c coins. Later, he has said that the inception of the two-dollar coin led to more profits. The booths used silver halide on thick paper with a mix of six or seven chemicals.

=== Photography ===
After servicing each model, he took a photograph of himself using the booth to check it was working properly. Adler continued to run the photobooths for over 50 years, and as a result built up an archive of self-portrait images of himself. In these photographs, Adler's clothes stay the same for long stretches. In some, his eyes are closed to shield them from the flash. The photos were also either serious or less so. The images of Adler's family are usually of a lower quality, as the machines taking them were often those that Adler had taken home for more significant repairs. He often stored the photos at home in shoe boxes, or simply loose among other items, though he used others as spacers or to screw in parts, folding them and leaving them hidden in the machines. Adler's wife Lorraine helped him store many of the photographs. He did not consider himself a photographer.

When Adler went on holiday, he often took photos of the booths he saw as part of his research; this included photo booths in Japan, America, and Brazil. One image in his collection is from a Chuck E. Cheese photo ride.

=== Flinders Street Station booth campaign and retirement ===
By 2018, many of the booths had been moved to Adler's garage. The business had lost its viability, partially due to the high cost of the chemicals needed; it cost $2,000 for him to buy one chemical for use in the process. Another reason was the advent of digital photo booths on the market. By 2022, the booths were said to have taken over 1 million photographs, though by that year only one of the booths, at Flinders Street Station, remained in operation. The Russian invasion of Ukraine was also damaging the business, as the paper, sourced from Russia, had increased in price from $100 to $800 per roll. The Flinders Street Station booth features photos of Adler on its side as an advertisement, and fan letters were often left there for him to read. Adler continued to service it twice a week.

That year, Christopher Sutherland and Jessie Norman, a couple looking to mark their first date, visited Adler's booth at Flinders Street Station. This is considered the best-known and most popular of Adler's booths. The couple saw a note taped to the booth stating that it was to be removed as the station managers were about to move some barriers, giving Adler 10 days' notice to remove the machine. The note also urged locals to make use of the booth before it was removed. Seeing that there were 6 days left, Sutherland made the decision to help and called the phone number on the note, subsequently launching a campaign on Facebook to save the booth. This was shared 150,000 times, gathered the support of the City of Melbourne and its mayor, and was successful; the booth was relocated to another spot in the same station.

Sutherland and Norman eventually took over the running of the booths owned by Adler upon his retirement under the name Metro-Auto-Photo. Sutherland has stated that "there was never any intention of us wanting to take over his business; it was purely just an act of preservation." As of 2025, the pair had custody of the seven working photo booths previously owned by Adler.

== Death and legacy ==
Sutherland and Norman discovered the hundreds of photographs he had taken and scanned them; with this help, Adler released the book Auto-Photo: A Life in Portraits, edited by photo historian Catlin Langford, who also began to curate a 2025 exhibition of the same name with the Centre for Contemporary Photography at the Royal Melbourne Institute of Technology university gallery. Adler died at 92 years old on 18 Dec 2024, prior to the exhibition's opening, after it was delayed. Sutherland has described him as one of the most photographed men in Australia.

The exhibition aimed to reunite a collection lost photo strips, of which 250 were unclaimed, to their subjects, with this initiative extending after the end of the exhibition. Sutherland and Norman plan to get the 16 photobooths back up and running across Melbourne. They post images from the Flinders Street Station booth on Instagram.

== Personal life ==
Adler had a wife, Lorraine, and two children, Cate and Damon Adler.

Norman has described Adler as "a man on an island, physically and mentally. I mean, he’s quite a solitary person. He does know the industry, and has friends in it, but he drove around all day servicing machines for decades. He spent a lot of his time just by himself, basically."
