= Tom Djäwa =

Australian Aboriginal artist

Tom Djäwa (a.k.a. Djäwa Daygurrgurr) (born 1905 – March 23, 1980) was an Aboriginal Australian artist. Djäwa worked in the mediums of bark painting and carving. Djäwa was one of the most important artists from the island of Milingimbi, and his works are held in museums and private collections around the world.

== Biography ==
Djäwa was the son of Narritjnarritj and Djambarrpuygu. He was the grandson of Walamangu. Djäwa had two sons, one who was known throughout Milingimbi as Dr. Gumbula (1954-2015), and the other named Joe Dhamanydji. Djäwa was born on an island called Milingimbi in Central Arnhem Land, Australia. Djäwa is classified in the Yirritja moiety. When Djäwa was young, he lived on Elcho Island before the Macassans had arrived on the island. A Macassan man by the name Captain Dg Gassing renamed him as Mangalay with his uncle as his witness. Djäwa compared this event to a baptism.

== Career ==
Djäwa was a ceremonial leader for his clan called the Daygurrgurr and his language was Gupapuynu. He was also the leader for all of the Gapapuyngu clans.

He received this leadership role at the beginning of the 1950s. As a ceremonial leader, he had the power to determine what would be crafted in the camps he was in charge of. Due to Djäwa's influential position, he tried to get other clan leaders to come to Milingimbi. He hoped that through their engagement in "cultural activities" he would solidify his position as a leader. He continued in his role as a leader for the Yolngu people at Milingimbi for approximately 30 years before he died.

Djäwa was good friends with Reverend Edgar Wells, a mission superintendent from 1949. They would spend a great deal of time together looking over works of art and discussing them at Wells' mission house. Wells' wife, Ann E. Wells, mentioned that the art became a "channel of understanding" between the Milingimbi artists and Edgar Wells. Djäwa and Wells worked closely together until Djäwa's death.

In 1974 Ph.D. student Ian Keen set out to Milingimbi, Australia to conduct research on Aboriginal ceremonies and songs. Ian and his family were sent to live in a community of missionaries at Milingimbi while he conducted his research. It was at this mission that Ian met Djäwa, someone he would come to know as a dear friend and teacher. Djäwa would help teach Ian about the language spoken among his people while also helping him understand some of Milingimbi’s culture and ceremonial practices. Djäwa also helped Keen with fieldwork, Keen also recalls being reprimanded by Djäwa for missing a small mortuary ceremony that he was unaware of. Djäwa took this opportunity to educate Keen on the importance of even the smallest scale. Thanks to Djäwa’s help Keen was able to return from Milinginbi with over 100 hours of recordings of mortuary song cycles with transcriptions and translations for many of them.

== In featured media ==
Djäwa appeared in two film documentaries by Cecil Holmes called Faces in the Sun and Djalambu in 1963 and 1964.

The 1963 film, Faces in the Sun was made by a husband and wife in an attempt to document Djalambu (Hollow Log) Coffin ceremony. The recording featured Djäwa as he was the leader of the Daygurrgurr Gupapuyngu people. One of Djäwa's sons performed a song with his band during the recording. Djäwa allowed the ceremony to be recorded because of the idea that it would be used as an educational video for younger generations to learn from.

In the 1963 documentary Djalambu, Djäwa stars in the re-enactment of his father, Narritjnarritj's Djalambu ceremony. This specific ceremony is used to celebrate the final burial of a member in the clan. This was recorded for the same reason Faces of the Sun was, as Djäwa wanted later generations to be able to watch and learn from the film.

Djäwa was drawn to the musical side of the arts as well. He recorded songs with Alice Moyle, an ethnomusicologist. He was also featured in part of the song Moikoi Song where he had played the clapsticks. It was recorded by Sandra LeBrun Holmes who was a part of the Milingimbi Mission in 1962 and featured on the Voyager Golden Record.

== Dancing for Queen Elizabeth II ==
In 1954, Djäwa and six other men traveled to Toowoomba to perform a ceremonial dance for Queen Elizabeth II and the Duke of Edinburgh. This event was held in the spirit of educating outsiders through the art of performance. The dance group consisted of Djäwa and five other men. According to Ann Wells, the wife of Edgar Wells, “It was a disquieting experience for most of the men to see the luxurious side of life but Djäwa had seen this event as "...a treasured and instructive journey into a new world."

== Collections ==
Some of Djäwa's works are displayed in these museums collections:

- Art Gallery of New South Wales
- Kluge-Ruhe Aboriginal Art Collection of the University of Virginia
- National Gallery of Victoria
- National Museum of Australia

== Exhibitions ==
- The classic period: Arnhem Land barks from the 1960s–2000s, Aboriginal and Pacific Art, Waterloo, 5 March 2013 – 30 March 2013
- Art from Milingimbi: taking memories back, Art Gallery of New South Wales, Sydney, 12 November 2016 - 29 January 2017
