= Hamilton Downs Station =

Former Australian cattle station turned youth camped

Coordinates: 23.6494387°S 133.4977659°E

Location in the Northern Territory

Hamilton Downs Station was a cattle station west of Alice Springs in the Northern Territory of Australia. It is now a youth camp.

== History ==
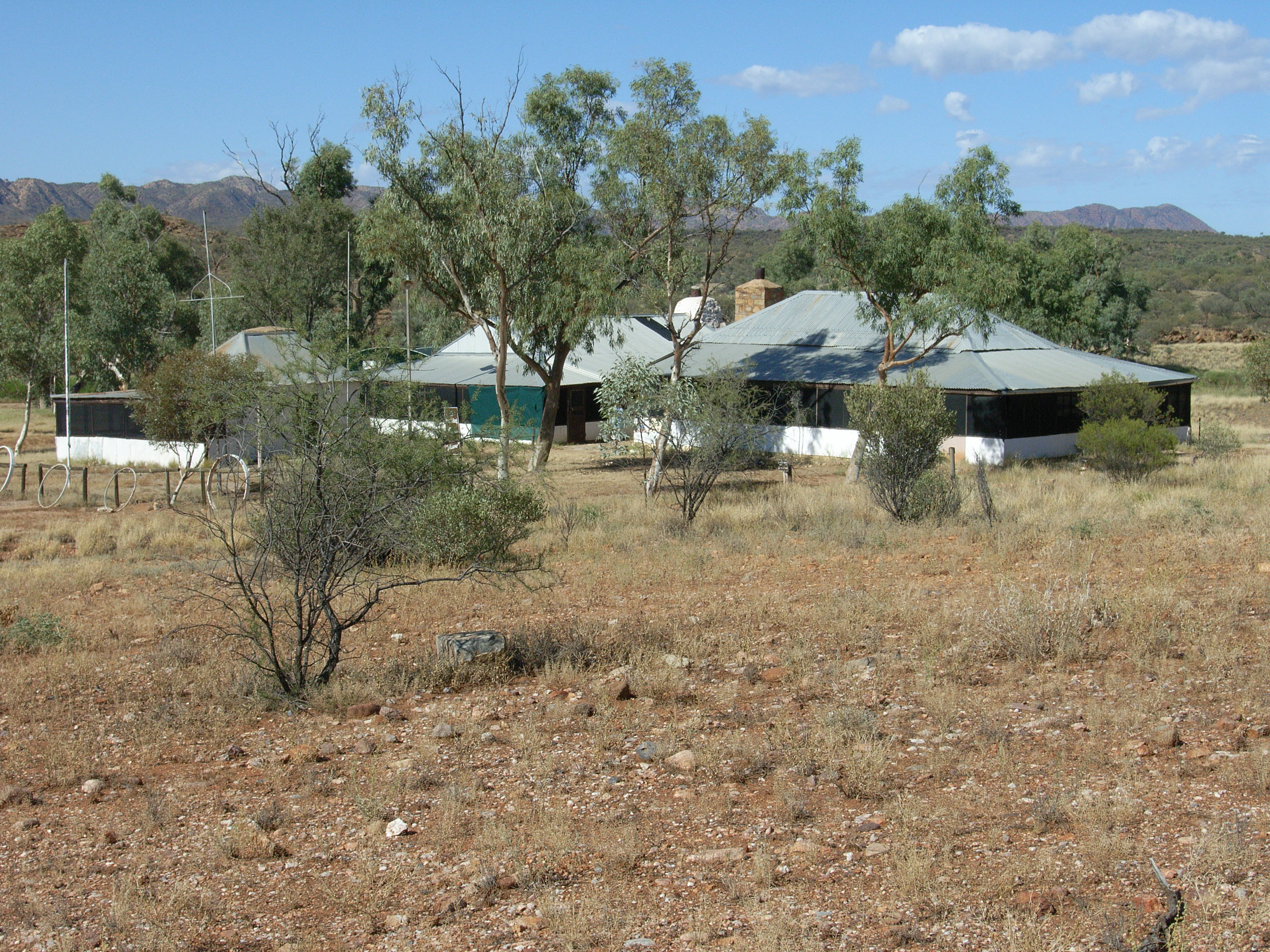
The old homestead on Hamilton Downs Station

Hamilton Downs was established in 1910 by hotel manager Sid Stanes Jr. and Ted Harris. It is named after a spring near Jay Creek which was named by John McDouall Stuart in 1860, after his supporter George Hamilton. The first substantial homestead was built in 1913.

The station was managed for some time by pioneer Aboriginal woman Amelia Kunoth and her husband Harry. By the 1940s, it was run by the Davis Brothers, Pat and John who invested in developing the water infrastructure of the property. by the 1950s the property was turning of over 3000 head of cattle per year.

Gwoja Tjungurrayi worked on the station at some point in the 1940s or 1950s.

Queen Elizabeth II visited the station in February 1963, during her Australian tour.

== Heritage listing ==
Significant restoration works were completed on the homesteads and stables in 1972. Five buildings on the property were heritage listed in 1993. The station celebrated its 100th birthday in 2011.

== Youth camp ==
Hamilton Downs has also been the location of a youth camp since March 1978. It was initially run by Apex Club of Central Australia, but as of 2016 was being managed by an independent committee.

== Gallery ==
Images from the Hamilton Downs Collection, available through Wikimedia Commons, all taken around the 1940s:

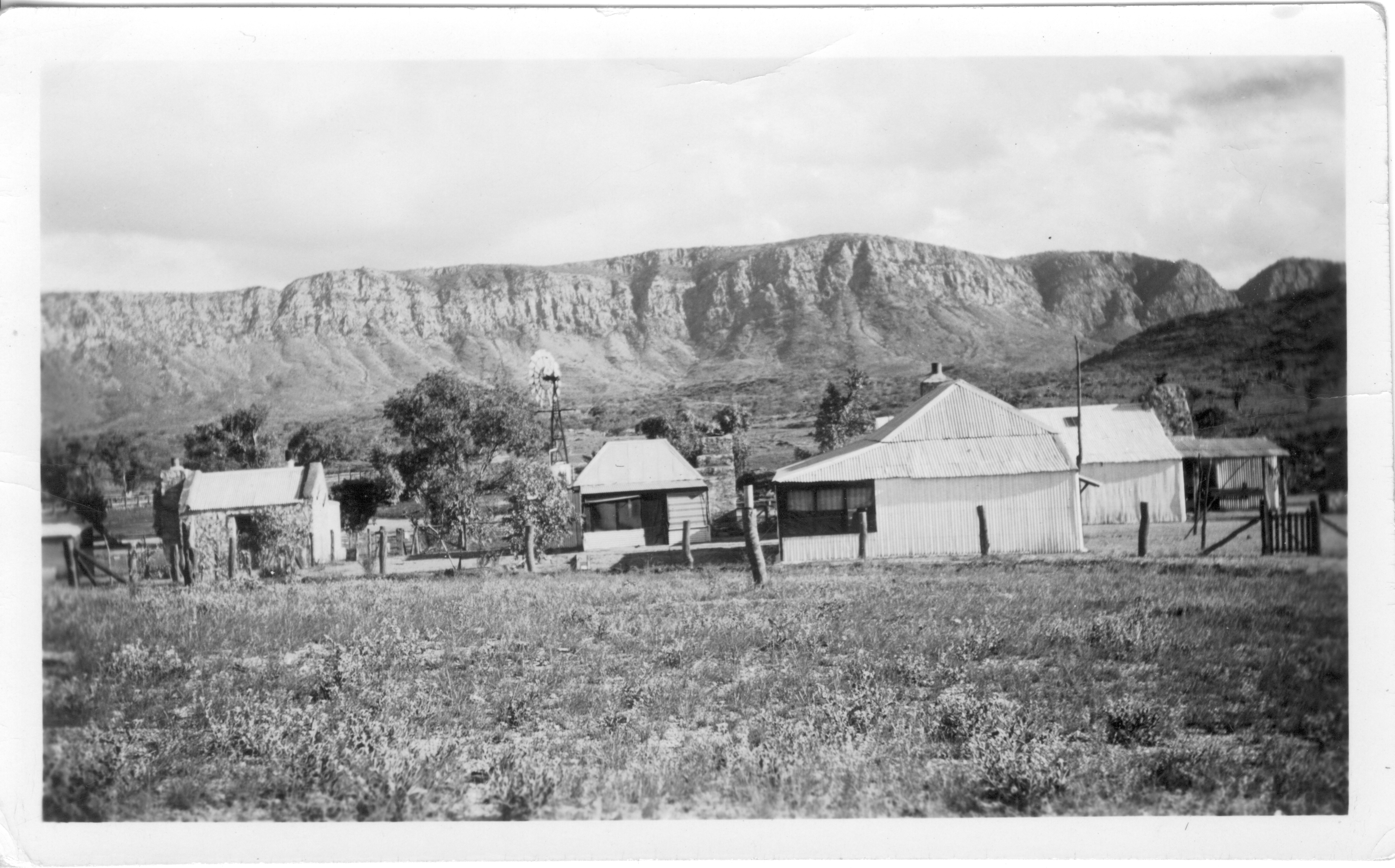
The old homestead at Hamilton Downs Station

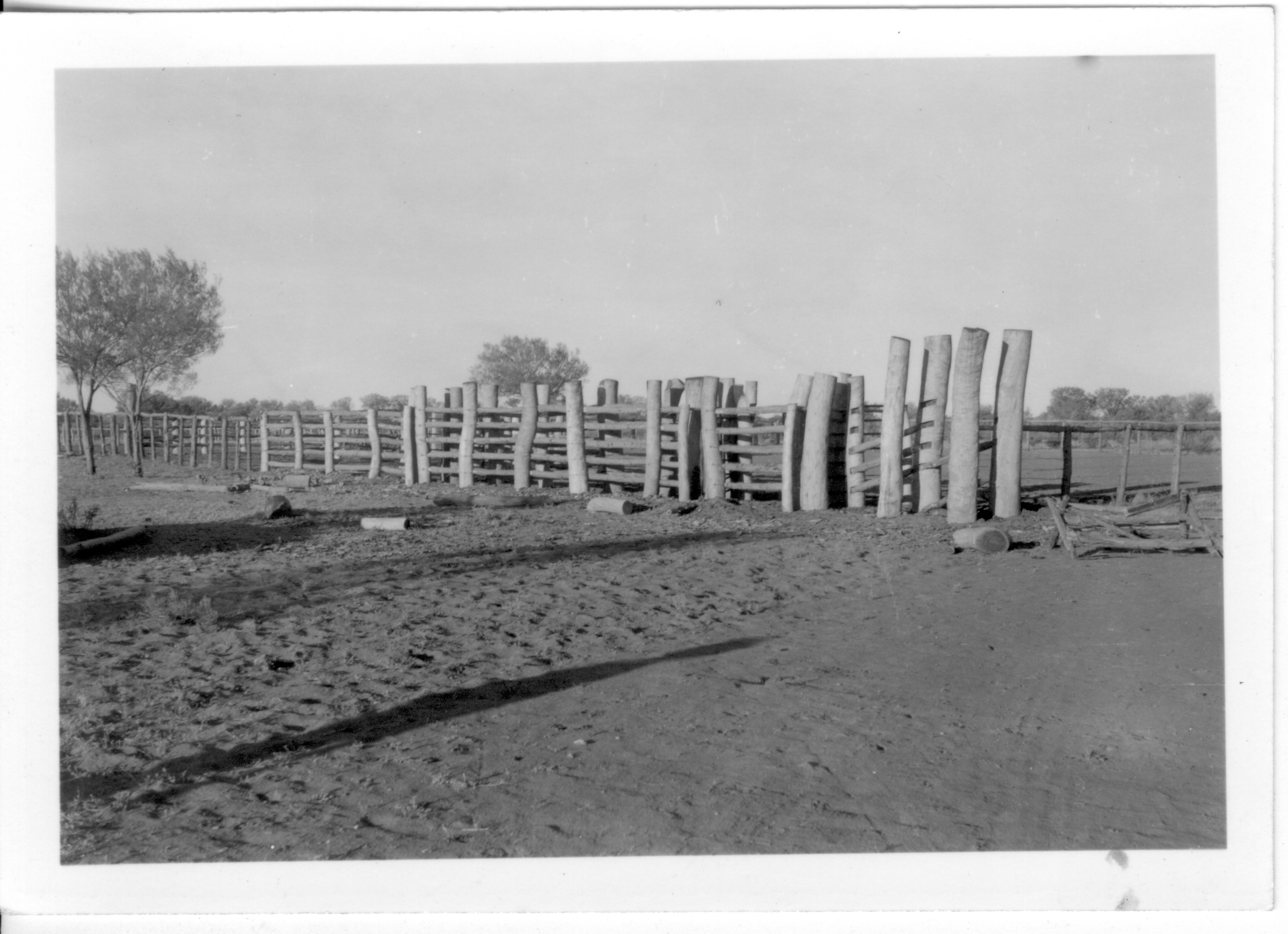
The yard near Cadney Bore on the Station

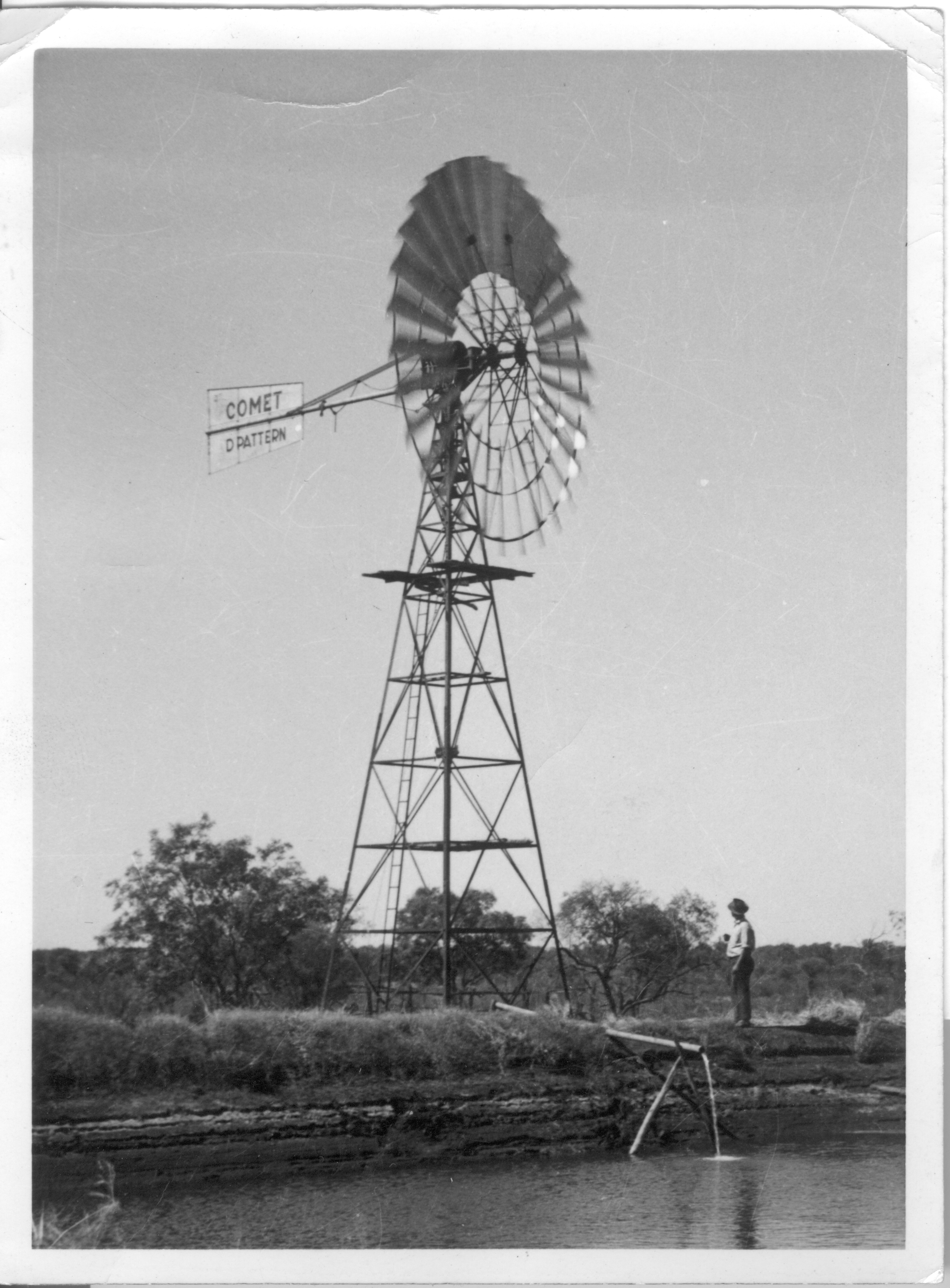
A windmill at the station in August 1946

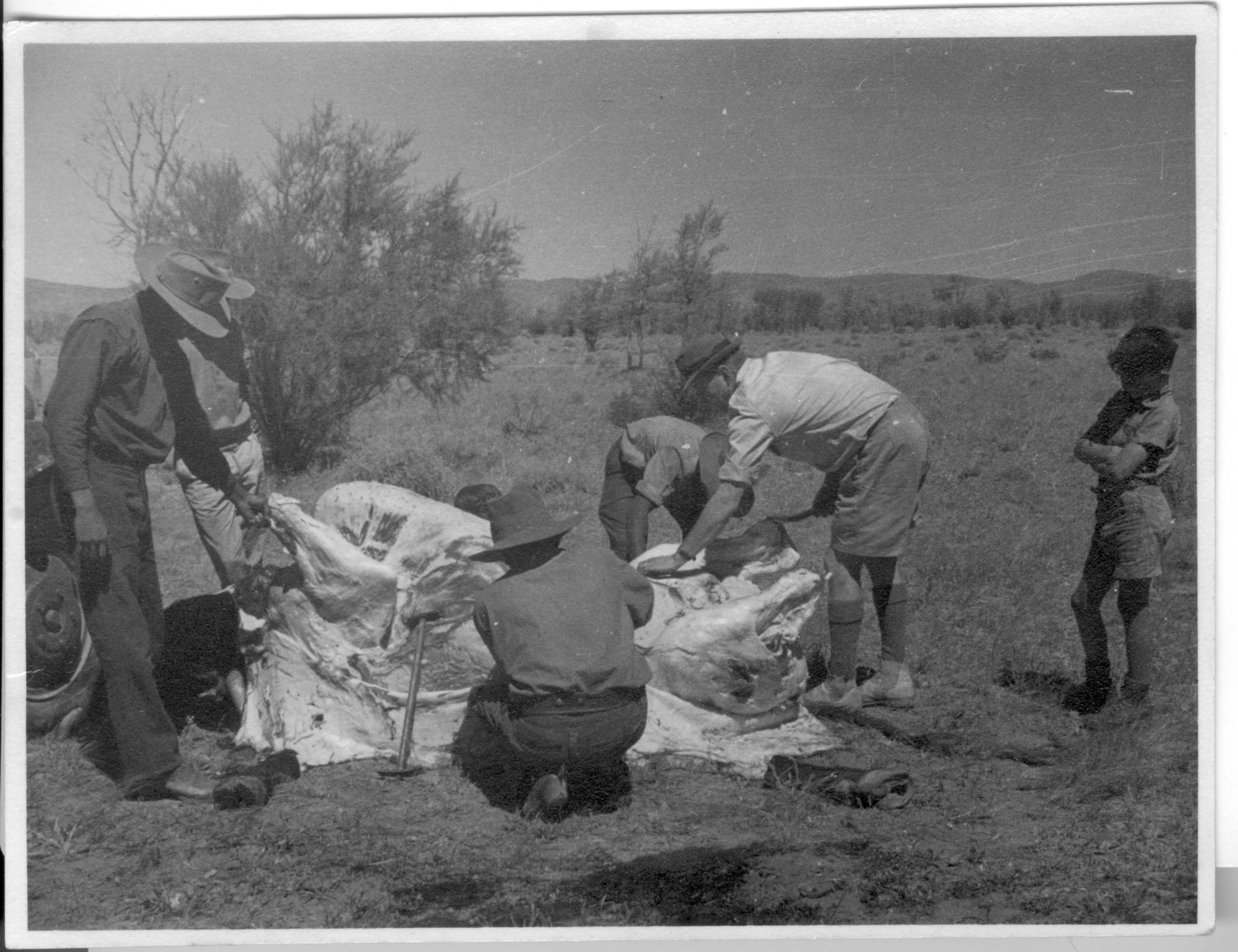
Skinning an animal, about 1950 at Hamilton Downs

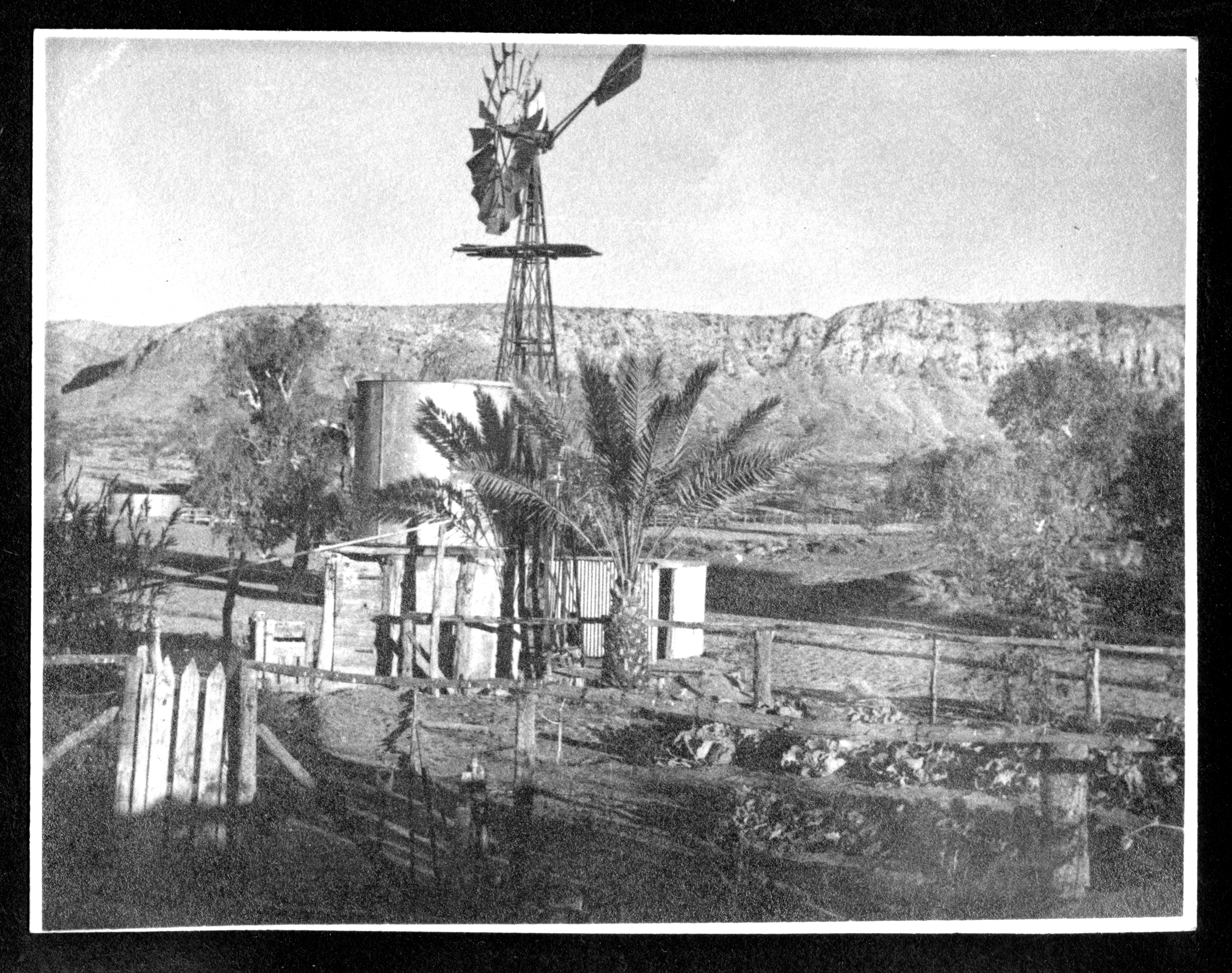
The station well near the old homsestead

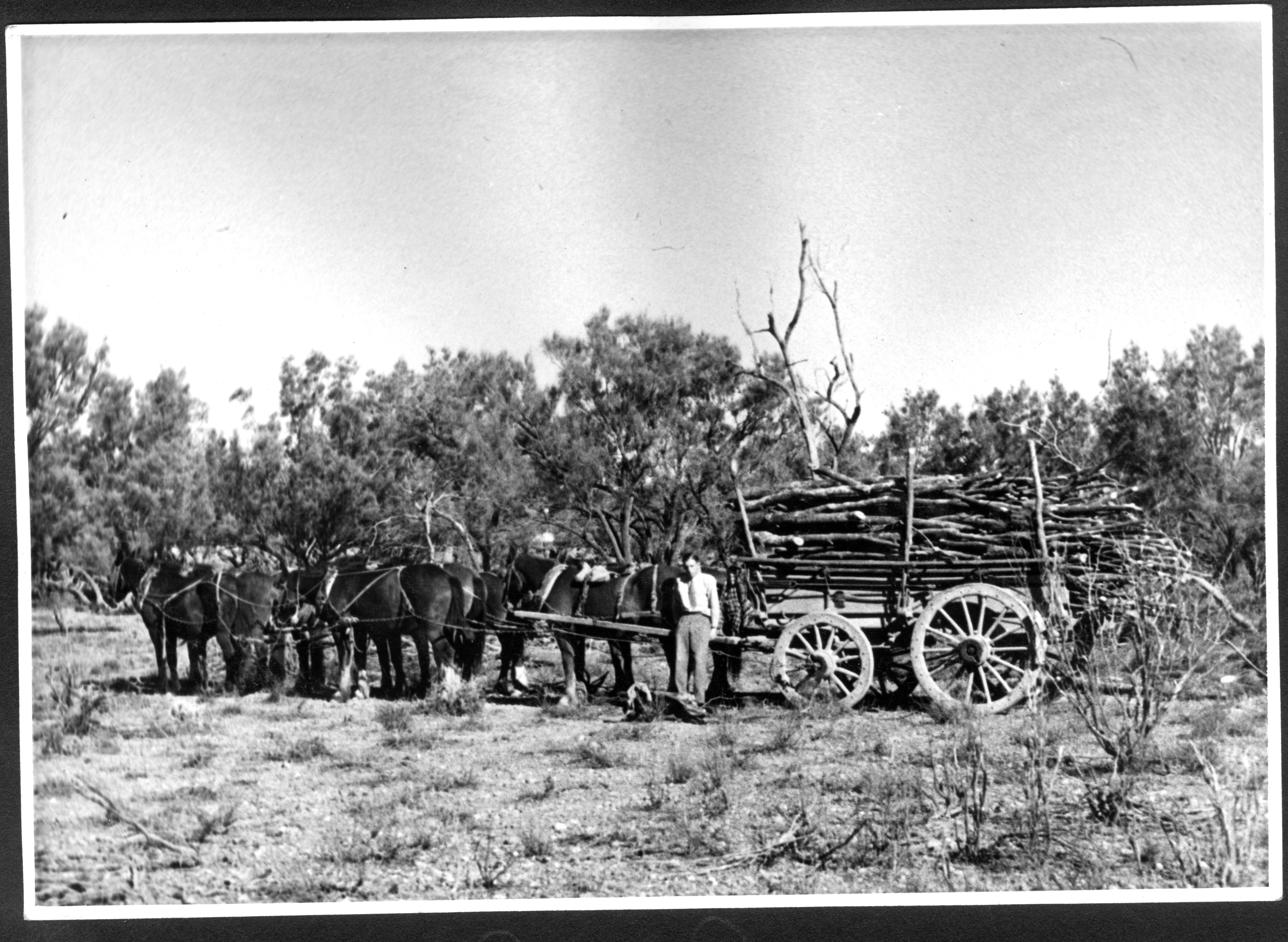
Horse drawn wagon loaded with timber

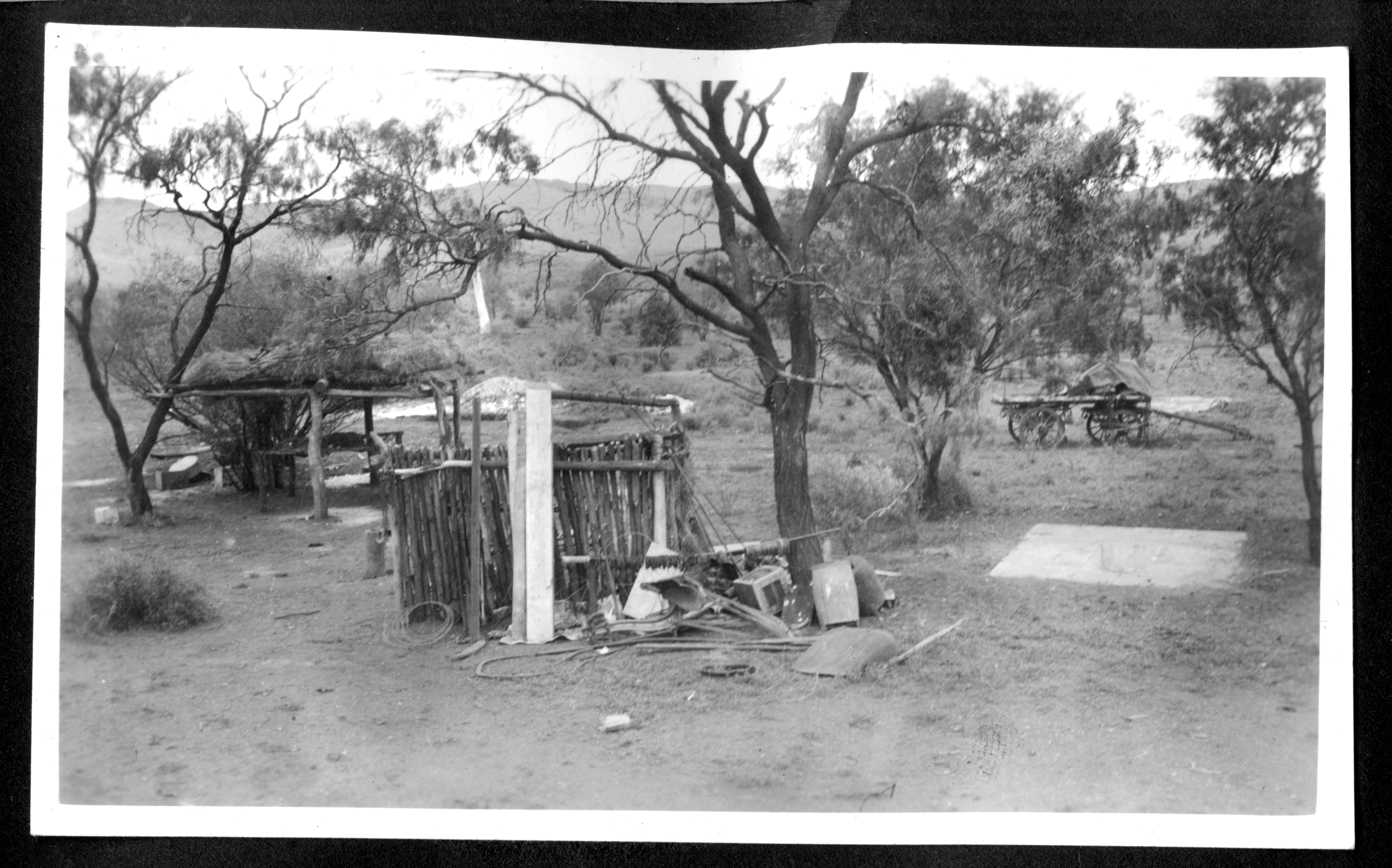
A hut at Ceilidh Well

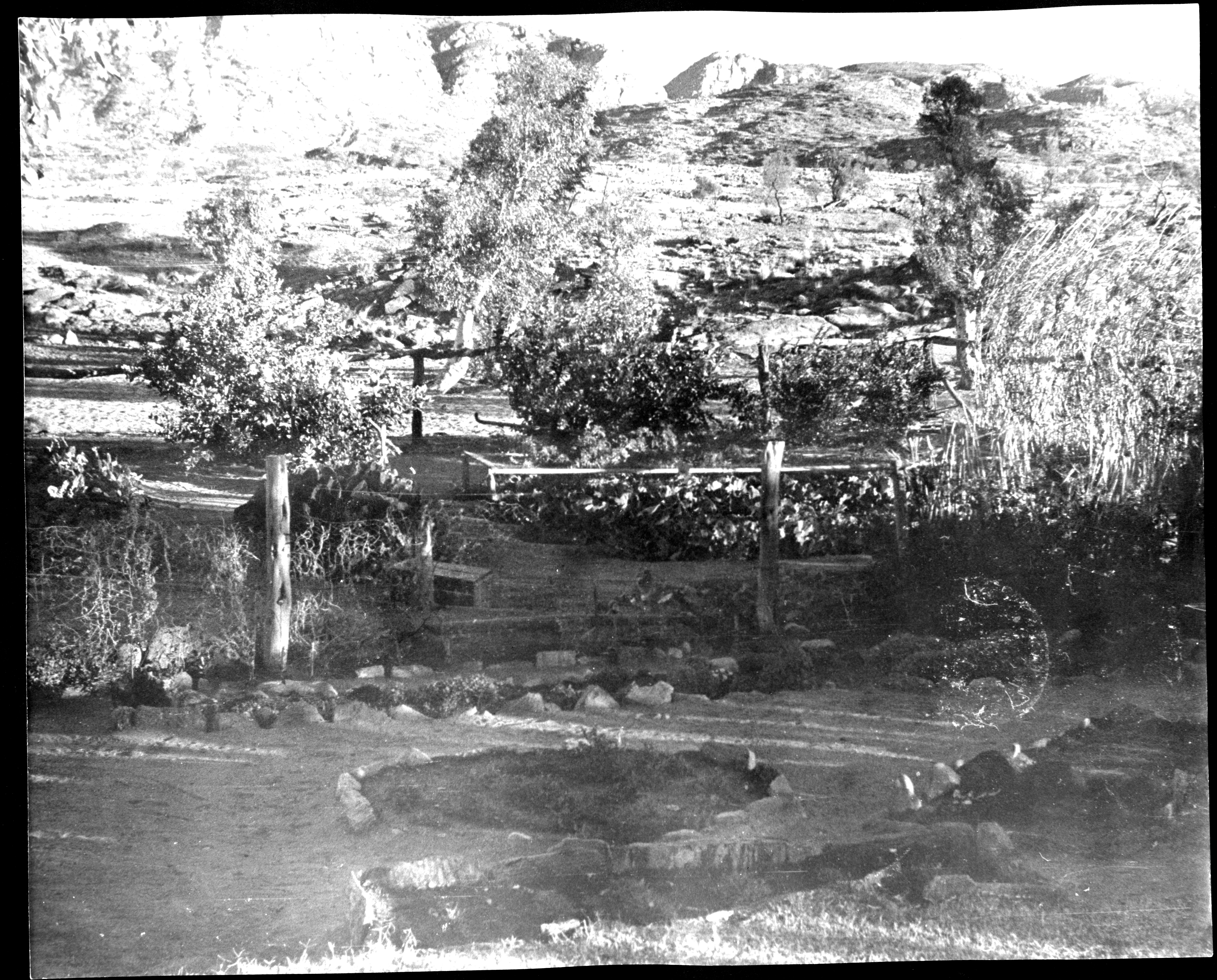
The old station garden

== See also ==
- List of ranches and stations
