= Faces in the Sun =

- Directed by: Cecil Holmes
- Written by: Cecil Holmes
- Produced by: Richard Mason
- Cinematography: Bryce Higgins
- Release date: February 23, 1965
- Running time: 34 min
- Country: Australia
- Language: English

Faces in the Sun is a 1965 Australian documentary film made by Cecil Holmes. It looks at four Aborigines, Garwin, Gwiwinga, Stephen and Djawa, trying to adapt to European ways while keeping their old ways. It was filmed (alongside a second film, The Modern Missionary) in the Arnhem Land for the Methodist Overseas Mission.

The Canberra Times TV critic John Howard objected to the portrayal of the subjects being "people with problems" writing "they remained, in this film, their problems. Not ours even when, as in the case of Stephen the carpenter, the "problem" was one of not having enough money to buy food for himself and his family - having been deprived of his tribal hunting grounds with the advent of the white man." The Age's Teletopics column said "it niggled at the conscience as it showed four Aborigines aware of their past, but unsure of their future."

The film won one of the two Gold Medals given out at the 1965 Australian Film Institute Awards, winning in the General category.
