= Ainslie Roberts =

Australian artist (1911–1993)

Ainslie Roberts (12 March 1911 – 28 August 1993) was an Australian painter, photographer, and commercial artist. He is best known for his interpretations of Aboriginal legends in his Dreamtime books, written in collaboration with ethnologist/anthropologist Charles Mountford.

== Early life ==
Roberts was born in London, England in 1911 to Harold Roberts and Rose (née Dougall). His early education was at St James's School, Clapton. The family migrated to Australia in 1922, staying first at Ardrossan before settling in Adelaide. He resumed his schooling at Westbourne Park Primary School in 1923 and was school dux and first in the state of South Australia in his Qualifying Certificate in 1926. His paintings and drawings from this period demonstrate proficient drafting skills and adept use of colour, along with affection for the Australian landscape and ships, locomotives, buildings and bridges as favourite subjects.

In 1927, he commenced work as an office boy in an insurance firm and developed a small graphic arts business as a sideline. He took evening classes in art at the South Australian School of Arts and Crafts for four years, where he found little inspiration but honed his technique nonetheless. Joining with the more commercially oriented Keith Webb in 1937 and Maurice McClelland in 1938, he formed Webb Roberts McClelland Pty Ltd, which was to become South Australia's largest advertising agency.

Roberts married Melva Jean ('Judy') Andrewartha on 27 February 1937. He was a keen photographer, and was for some time president of the Adelaide Camera Club. Small in stature, but fit through swimming and working out in a health studio, he was rejected from military service during World War II because of a history of rheumatic fever, but joined the Volunteer Defence Corps, where his experiences inspired some fine cartoons. Ainslie and Judy Roberts' son Rhys was born in 1944.

== In Alice Springs ==
In 1950, with a burgeoning business employing 35 staff, Roberts experienced what was diagnosed as a nervous breakdown and was ordered rest and quiet. His wife Judy bought him a one-way ticket to Alice Springs, where invigorated by the fresh air and the landscape, he commenced sketching and painting and resolved to extricate himself from the advertising business over the next five years.

In 1952, he met Charles Pearcy Mountford, who was also a keen photographer. Mountford was a largely self-taught ethnologist, writer and documentary film maker who, though he would take a Diploma of Anthropology from Cambridge in the late 1950s, worked and remained largely outside academic circles.

For several years, the two took journeys around South Australia to photograph cave paintings and rock carvings, and in 1956 they made the first of several trips to the Centre. Mountford collected myths and legends from tribal people, and Roberts sketched and painted people and places. They made friends with characters like Bill Harney, a bushman, raconteur and writer, and Gwoya Jungarai or "One Pound Jimmy", famous for being depicted on earlier Australian stamps and in Walkabout magazine. With Mountford, he formed a company that produced the first tourist guides to Uluru and Kata Tjuṯa.

== Emergence as an artist ==
In 1962, Roberts resolved to paint some of the myths Mountford had collected. His initial works were in oil, but with only three completed, he began to suffer nausea and headaches, which a specialist attributed to an allergy to turpentine and linseed oil. Mountford introduced him to Sidney Nolan, who suggested he try PVA paints, later known as acrylics. Roberts found success with them and exhibited his first 21 works at the Osborne Art Gallery, Adelaide on 1 October 1963. Mountford opened the exhibition, saying, "No Australian artist has painted like this; he has followed no school – he has copied no previous artist."

Roberts drew from many of the influences of the early twentieth century, though his style belongs to none. He acknowledged a debt to René Magritte for his ability to reveal the secret meaning of the world and its objects. His paintings of Aboriginal myths and legends often feature a central focus – person, animal, tree, rock or celestial body – and a secondary, sometimes hidden element that casts light on the meaning of the work. His line drawings reflect the inspiration of a critical observer of life and the landscape and the technique and discipline of the commercial artist.

The exhibition was a sellout, and early in 1964, the poet Ian Mudie, who was publishing manager of Rigby Ltd, proposed a book of the works. Roberts' format was simple – one myth to an opening, a painting on one side and the text and a line drawing on the other. The Dreamtime was first published in 1965 and has been reprinted many times.

== Fruitful final journey with Mountford ==
Roberts and Mountford made their last journey together in 1965. The Dawn of Time (1969), The First Sunrise (1971) and a larger edition The Dreamtime Book (1973) were all published before Mountford's death in 1976. The journalist Douglas Lockwood replaced Mountford on subsequent trips and he and Roberts would collaborate on Rigby's Sketchbook series. Dreamtime Heritage (1975), Dreamtime: the Aboriginal Heritage (1981) and Echoes of the Dreamtime (1988) were published with contributions from the Roberts, Lockwood and Mountford families. In 1980 Roberts also provided 45 sketches and paintings for Douglas Lockwood's original 1962 life story I, The Aboriginal as told by Waipuldanya of the Alawa people of the Roper River NT.

Roberts and his wife had a holiday home in Victor Harbor, and occasionally acted as judge at the town's annual Rotary art show. He died aged 82, and his remains cremated after a service at the Blackwood Uniting Church.

== Honours ==
Roberts was appointed a Member of the Order of Australia in the Queen's Birthday Honours in June 1993. He died in August that year. He described his role as: "a communicator… a white man painting in a white man's way and trying, visually, to show the white people of Australia that this fascinating land they live in has a rich and ancient cultural heritage that they should be aware of and respect".

One of his lithographs of Gwoya Jungarai was the inspiration for the design of the reverse side of the Australian 2 dollar coin.
