= Electoral results for the division of Gwoja =

This is a list of electoral results for the electoral division of Gwoja, of the Northern Territory Legislative Assembly in Australia. The seat was created in a 2019 redistribution for the 2020 general election, replacing the electoral division of Stuart.

== Members for Gwoja ==
Member	Party	Term
Chansey Paech	Labor	2020–present

== Election results ==
=== Elections in the 2020s ===
2020 Northern Territory general election: Gwoja
Party	Candidate	Votes	%	±%
Labor	Chansey Paech	1,612	60.6	−2.1
Country Liberal	Phillip Alice	702	26.4	+3.9
Federation	Kenny Lechleitner	344	12.9	+12.9
Total formal votes		2,658	94.7	N/A
Informal votes		148	5.3	N/A
Turnout		2,806	52.8	N/A
Two-party-preferred result
Labor	Chansey Paech	1,729	65.0	−7.1
Country Liberal	Phillip Alice	929	35.0	+7.1
Labor hold		Swing	−7.1	

2024 Northern Territory general election: Gwoja
Party	Candidate	Votes	%	±%
Labor	Chansey Paech	1,654	65.8	+5.9
Country Liberal	Jarrod Jupurula Williams	858	34.2	+7.9
Total formal votes		2,512	97.4	+2.6
Informal votes		68	2.6	−2.6
Turnout		2,580	42.1	
Labor hold		Swing	+1.1	
