= Gentle Strangers =

- Directed by: Cecil Holmes
- Written by: Cecil Holmes
- Produced by: Roland Beckett
- Starring: Yee Choo Koo
- Cinematography: Mick Bornemann; Kerry Brown; Bruce Hillyard; Don McAlpine; David Sanderson
- Edited by: Graham Chase
- Music by: Barry Conyngham
- Production company: Film Australia
- Release date: 1972
- Running time: 58 minutes
- Country: Australia
- Language: English

Gentle Strangers is a 1972 Australian film directed by Cecil Holmes.

== Plot ==
A Chinese boy and a Thai girl have a romance when they meet in a seedy boarding house in Sydney. An Indonesian student is posted to a rural research centre while his wife and child cope with life in the city.

== Cast ==
- Yee Choo Koo as Preeyan
- Clem Chow as Lawrence
- Rick Lay as himself
- Eric Lay as himself
- Yanti Lay as herself
- Jennifer West as Miss Emerson
- Lyn Murphy as Mrs Baker

== Production ==
Cecil Holmes spent a year researching and writing the film, which was made for Film Australia. It was shot on 16mm with a mostly non professional cast.

== Release ==
The film was released through non commercial film libraries and screened on commercial television but did not screen in cinemas.
