= Gordon Andrews (industrial designer) =

Australian artist and designer (1914–2001)

- Born: 10 January 1914; Ashfield
- Died: 17 January 2001 (aged 87); Sydney
- Occupations: Designer, industrial designer, product designer, graphic designer, furniture designer, painter, sculptor
- Notable work: Banknotes of the Australian dollar
- Awards: Honorary Royal Designer for Industry (1987); gold medal (Design Institute of Australia)

Gordon Andrews RDI (10 January 1914 – 17 January 2001) was an Australian artist, graphic designer, and industrial designer. He is best known for the design of Australia's first decimal banknotes. His work also included the design of products such as cookware, jewellery, and furniture, as well as interior design, exhibition design, painting, sculpture, and photography. "He is widely acknowledged as one of Australia's most prominent mid-20th century multi-disciplinary artists."

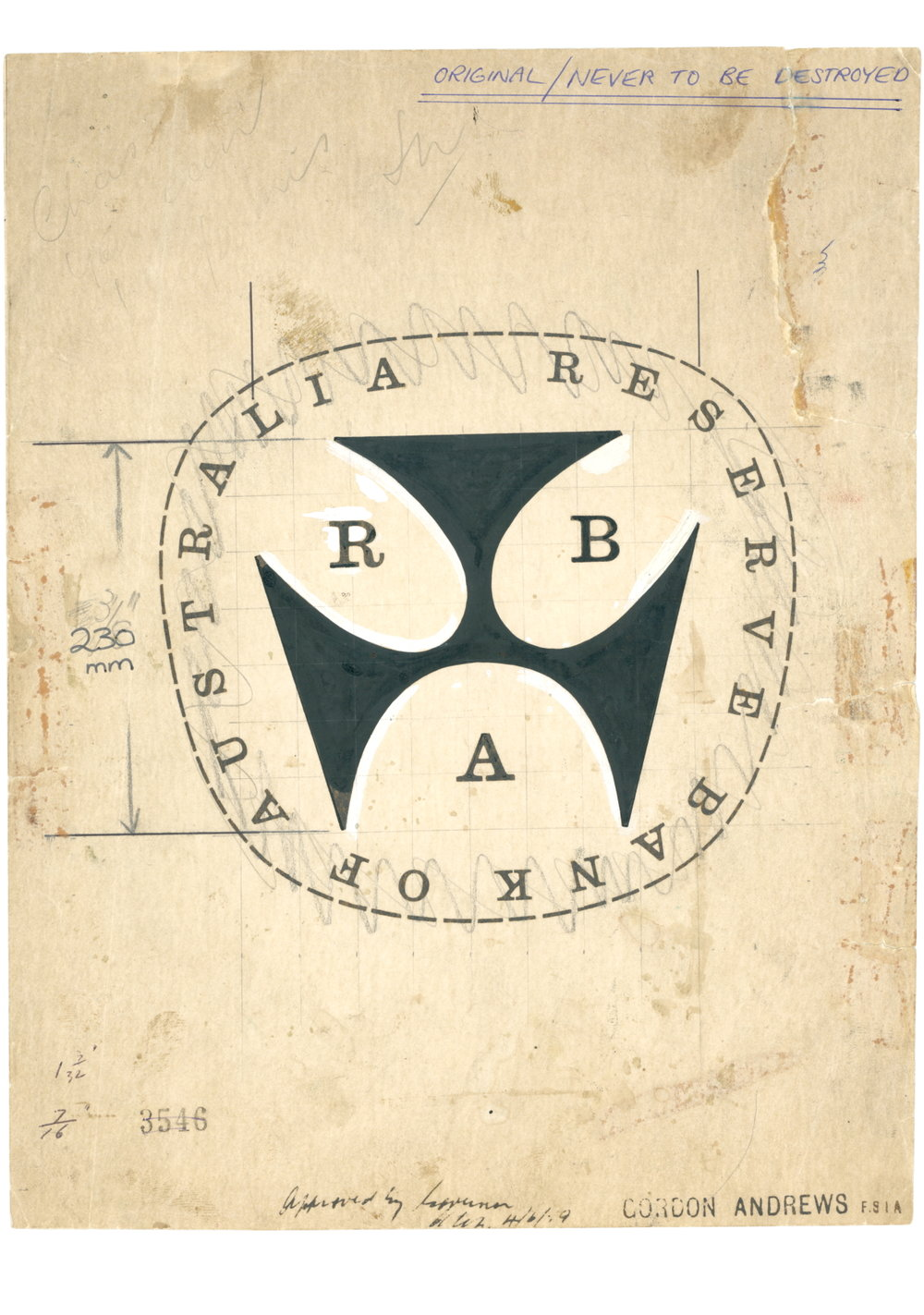
Reserve Bank of Australia logo draft working image, Gordon Andrews (1959)

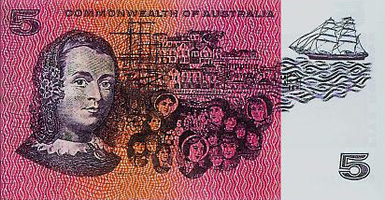
Australian $5 note design, Gordon Andrews (1966)

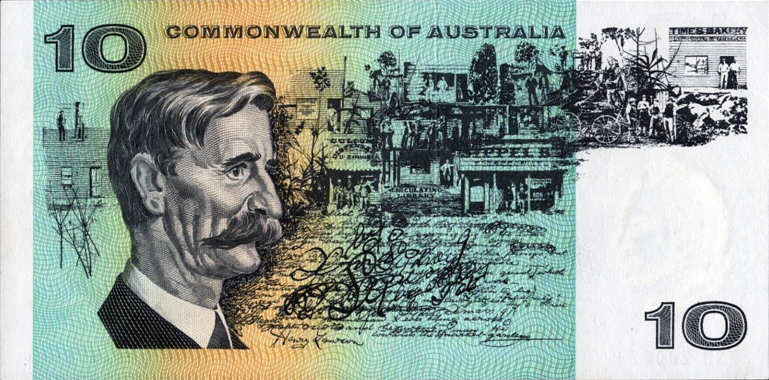
Australian $10 note design, Gordon Andrews (1966)

== Early life and education ==
Gordon Arthur Andrews was born in Ashfield, NSW. He studied engineering at East Sydney Technical College before switching to graphic design. After graduation, he worked for a Sydney advertising agency, and then moved to London, where he lived and worked prior to World War II. He returned to Australia in 1939.

== Career and legacy ==
During the war, Andrews worked as a draftsman for De Havilland, and later, as a supervisor of an experimental hangar.

In the 1950s he worked on commissions in the UK and Italy, and lived with his family in Turin in the mid-1950s. He declined a job at Olivetti (though he would later design furniture for Olivetti showrooms) and returned to Sydney in the early 1960s.

In Sydney, he worked on a projects for the Australian Government including the Australian Pavilion of the Comptoire Suisse trade fair and the New South Wales Government Tourist Bureau. He also designed Australian exhibitions for trade fairs in Paris, Cologne, and Tokyo, as well as the New Zealand Government Tourist Bureau. Later he designed the logo for the Reserve Bank of Australia, and worked on projects for the National Gallery or Australia, as well as Parliament House and the National Athletics Stadium in Canberra. "At a time when Australian design was seen as parochial in outlook and execution, Andrews stood out as a designer of international style and sophistication."

He was the first Australian designer to be elected a Fellow of the Society of Industrial Artists and Designers in the UK (now the Chartered Society of Designers). He was a member of the Alliance Graphique Internationale (AGI), and in 1987 was named an Honorary Royal Designer for Industry by the Royal Society of Arts (RSA) in London. He was also awarded the Design Institute of Australia's gold medal in 1985, and inducted into the institute's Hall of Fame in 2011.

In 1993 the Powerhouse Museum staged Gordon Andrews: a designer's life, a retrospective exhibition of his work. The exhibition was documented in a monograph also titled Gordon Andrews: a designer's life. Both the book and exhibition relied on Andrews's extensive archives, which were fortuitously acquired by the museum before his house was destroyed by fire the following year.

Gordon Andrews died in Sydney on 17 January 2001.

== Publications ==
- Andrews, Gordon (1993). Gordon Andrews: A Designer's Life. University of New South Wales. p. 191. ISBN 9780868402451.
