= I, the Aboriginal =

1962 book and 1964 Australian film

- Directed by: Cecil Holmes
- Produced by: Kip Porteous
- Release date: 1964
- Running time: 56 minute
- Country: Australia
- Language: English

I, the Aboriginal is a 1962 Australian book and 1964 television film about the life of Aboriginal Australian man Phillip Roberts (or Waipuldanya).

The 1962 book, written in first person, is described as the autobiography of Waipuldanya, a full-blood Aboriginal man of the Alawa tribe at Roper River (Ngukurr) in the Northern Territory, as told to Douglas Lockwood. The book concerns Waipuldanya's traditional upbringing and his training to become a skilled medical assistant for the Department of Health at Darwin Hospital. Lockwood wrote the book from more than 100 hours of interview with Roberts. I, the Aboriginal won the major literary award at the Adelaide Festival of the Arts in 1962.

An ABC Television film, in which Roberts played himself, was based on the book. Directed by Cecil Holmes, the film won the Australian Film Institute's Gold Award in 1964. Holmes' wife and Indigenous advocate Sandra Le Brun Holmes contributed an account of the experience of their making I, the Aboriginal to Walkabout magazine.
