= Gordon Andrews (footballer) =

Australian rules footballer

Personal information
- Full name: Gordon Andrews
- Born: 11 November 1934
- Died: 22 August 2021 (aged 86)
- Original team: Sandhurst / Orbost
- Height: 183 cm (6 ft 0 in)
- Weight: 92 kg (203 lb)

Playing career^{1}
Years	Club	Games (Goals)
1956	Richmond	1 (0)
- ^{1} Playing statistics correct to the end of 1956.

Gordon Andrews (11 November 1934 – 22 August 2021) was an Australian rules footballer who played with Richmond in the Victorian Football League (VFL).
