= Gwoya Tjungurrayi =

First named Aboriginal person on an Australian stamp

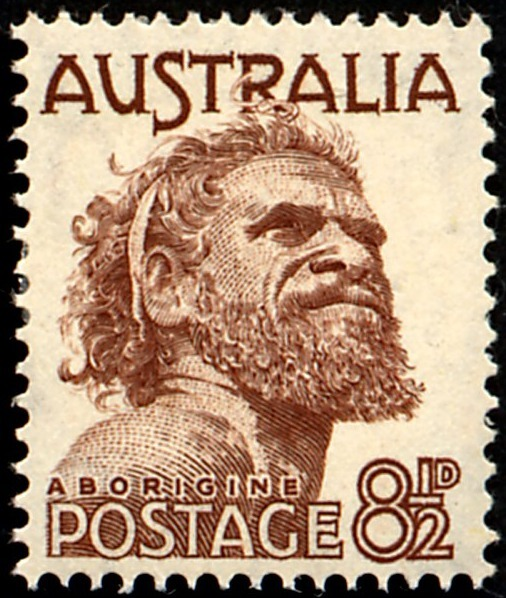
1950 stamp

Gwoya Tjungurrayi (c. 1895 – 28 March 1965), also spelt Gwoja Tjungarrayi, Gwoya Jungarai, and Gwoya Djungarai, and also known by his nickname One Pound Jimmy, is known for being the first Aboriginal person to be featured on an Australian postage stamp, in 1950, although his name was not used to describe the image on the stamp. A survivor of the 1928 Coniston massacre in the Northern Territory, he later became an elder and lawman of his people. The name Gwoya, is a non-Indigenous rendering of the Anmatyerr word Kwatye, meaning 'water' or 'rain'.

The electoral division of Gwoja was named after him.

== Biography ==
Tjungurrayi was born around 1895 in the Tanami Desert of the Northern Territory, 200 km (120 mi) north-west of Alice Springs, in the region surrounding Coniston Station. He was a Walpiri and Anmatyerre man.

As pastoralism expanded in the region during the early 1900s, encroaching further into Tjungurrayi's ancestral country, tensions intensified during the drought of the 1920s, with increasing competition over water and food. He survived the Coniston Massacre in the then Territory of Central Australia in 1928, although accounts of his survival differ:

One claimed his father was taken prisoner by Constable Murray, escaped and fled with his family to the Arltunga region east of Alice Springs. Another described Tjungurrayi "worm[ing] his way out from among the dead and dying' at Yurrkuru to 'narrowly escape death from a hail of rifle fire poured at him by men".
Clifford Possum Tjapaltjarri's oral account of his step-father's capture and evasion records that a mounted policeman arrested and chained him up before "carry him 'round to show'm every soakage. They leave him... tied up on a tree, big chain... they put leg chain too... Then everybody go out and shoot all the people... They come back and see him – nothing! This chain he broke'm with a big rock and he take off... to mine...".

After the massacre, Tjungurrayi spent time in Alyawarre country near Arltunga. He worked as a miner at the Arltunga gold mine and the mica mines in the eastern Harts Range, before moving on and working for pastoralists at Napperby, Hamilton Downs, and Mount Wedge Stations. His career as a stockman and station hand lasted 20 years. Tjungurrayi also made and sold boomerangs.

In the 1930s, Tjungurrayi and his family lived near the rations depot near Jay Creek. They trapped dingoes, selling their skins to the depot. They later moved to Hamilton Downs Station.

== Names ==
Tjungurrayi's first name, Gwoja, is a rendering of the Anmatyerr word Kwaty or Kwatye, meaning "water". His last name reflects his skin name Tjungurrayi, also known as Kngwarray in Anmatyerr. Recent sources spell his name Gwoja Tjungarrayi, although the spelling Gwoya Jungarai was used by Australia Post, Gwoya Tjungurrayi and Gwoya Djungarai have also been recorded.

Some sources claim that his nickname "One Pound Jimmy" comes from his sale of boomerangs for one Australian pound, as whenever asked how much one of his pieces were, he would answer "One pound, boss". (Note: One source claims the nickname was derived from "his persistent demand for a pound".) However the nickname is deemed offensive by some today.

== Tjungurrayi as a national symbol ==
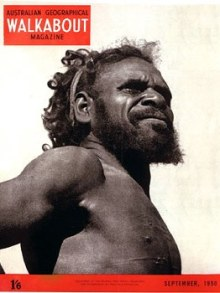
The September 1936 Walkabout cover

Tjungurrayi came to public attention when photographer Roy Dunstan took a striking portrait of him in 1935, under the instruction of a young tourism executive from Melbourne, Charles H. Holmes, who described the encounter:

During a visit to the Spotted Tiger mica mine out east of Alice Springs, I once met as fine a specimen of Aboriginal manhood as you would wish to see. Tall and lithe, with a particularly well-developed torso, broad fore head, strong features and the superb carriage of the unspoiled primitive native, he rejoiced under the name of "One Pound Jimmy".

The image was used as the cover of a new tourism magazine called Walkabout in September 1936. It drew such a response that the magazine's editors requested that Tjungurrayi be rewarded by the Department of Internal Affairs, with a gift of camping equipment, including a camp oven. He featured on the cover of the September 1950 edition of the same magazine, the description reading "Australian Aboriginal". Dunstan's original photograph of Tjungurrayi and others taken during their meeting featured in magazines and early central Australian tourism campaigns. Holmes claimed he used the images repeatedly presenting Jimmy as a "symbol of a vanishing race".

Tjungurrayi also appeared on the cover of Dawn, a magazine for Aboriginal people in New South Wales, in 1954.

With the photos leading to international recognition, people regularly travelled to central Australia seeking Tjungurrayi's autograph or fingerprint. Newspaper reports suggest the attention was unwanted by Tjungurrayi, who was working at Central Mount Wedge Station at the time. He even shaved off his beard at one stage to be less recognisable.

In 1950 the image was used on an 8½ pence stamp and a 2 shillings and 6 pence (half crown) stamp, which made Tjungurrayi the first Aboriginal person, as well as the first living Australian, to appear on an Australian postage stamp. The stamp was re-released in 1952, and over 99 million of the stamps were sold between 1950 and 1966. However, in 2021 it was discovered that his image was reproduced on an even earlier stamp – a stamp released in 1938 to celebrate the centenary of Geelong. This stamp was only a collector's item and there was no decimal mark printed on it.

Tjungurrayi's image was used anonymously on the 1938 stamp, and he was just described as "an Aborigine" on the 1950 one.

Tjungurrayi appeared on the cover of Walkabout again in September 1950.

== Later life, death and legacy ==
Tjungurrayi was respected as an elder and lawman of his people in later life, continuing to live in the Tanami region. He died there on 28 March 1965. He is thought to have been over 70 at the time of his death. His obituary appeared in the Northern Territory News and on the front page of the Centralian Advocate, a rare honour for an Aboriginal person at that time.

The design of the Australian two-dollar coin was inspired by a drawing of Tjungurrayi by artist Ainslie Roberts in 1988.

The Northern Territory Electoral division of Gwoja, created in 2019, was named after Tjungurrayi.

== Family ==
Tjungurrayi and his wife Long Rose Nagnala, whom he met at Napperby, had three sons, Tim Leura Tjapaltjarri, Clifford Possum Tjapaltjarri, both notable artists, and Immanuel Rutjinama Tjapaltjarri who became a Lutheran pastor.

Tim Leura Tjapaltjarri's work Ancestor Dreaming was the subject of another Australian stamp in 1988; unlike the use of his father's image, Tim's name was used and he was celebrated as a significant artist.
