= Cecil Holmes (director) =

New Zealand-born film director and writer (1921–1994)

Cecil William Holmes
- Born: 23 June 1921; Waipukurau, Hawke's Bay, New Zealand
- Died: 24 August 1994 (aged 73); Australia
- Occupations: Film director, writer
- Known for: Documentary films; advocacy for Indigenous representation
- Notable work: I, the Aboriginal, Captain Thunderbolt, Gentle Strangers, The Killing of Angel Street
- Spouse: Sandra Le Brun Holmes

Cecil William Holmes (23 June 1921 – 24 August 1994) was a New Zealand-born film director and writer who worked mainly in Australia. He is known for his 1964 telefilm I, the Aboriginal, based on the 1962 book of the same name.

== Biography ==
Cecil William Holmes was born on 23 June 1921 in Waipukurau, Hawke's Bay, New Zealand.

He served in the Royal New Zealand Air Force and British Royal Navy during World War II before turning to filmmaking. He made a number of documentaries for the New Zealand National Film Unit then moved to Australia, where he directed several feature films and a number of documentaries for the Commonwealth Film Unit.

He died on 24 August 1994.

== Personal life ==
His second wife was author and Indigenous Australian advocate Sandra Le Brun Holmes, who contributed an account of the experience of their making I, the Aboriginal to Walkabout, a magazine for which Holmes himself also wrote.

== Recognition ==
The Cecil Holmes Award given by the Australian Directors Guild is named after him. The Award was instigated in 1995, and is presented by the ADG board from time to time to honour recipients who have advocated for the role of the director.

== Selected filmography ==
- Captain Thunderbolt (1953) – director
- Words for Freedom (1953) (documentary) – director
- Three in One (1957) – director
- Lotu (1962) (documentary) – director
- I, The Aboriginal (documentary) – director
- Faces in the Sun (1964), a documentary about the mission at Yirrkala in Arnhem Land, produced by the Methodist Overseas Mission (digitised and held by the Mitchell Library in Sydney)
- Gentle Strangers (1972) – director
- The Killing of Angel Street (1981) – writer

== Screenplays ==
- Feature Film Screenplays (unrealised) 'Call Me by My Proper Name' (true story of the man hunt for Australian Aboriginal Larrey Boy in the Northern Territory of Australia)
- Mackie's in Town (screenplay of the true story of Pat Mackie, leader of Mt. Isa Mines Strike of 1964)
- Morrison of Peking (screenplay based upon book by Australian writer Cyril Pearl, 1967)
- The Planter of Malaita (screenplay of a Joseph Conrad novella)

== Books ==
- One Man's Way, (autobiography) Penguin, 1986
- Mask of Smiles, 1994 (Holmes' journey into the Philippines), completed yet unpublished at time of his death.
