= Australian two-dollar note =

Former denomination of Australian currency

Two Dollars
- Country: Australia
- Value: 2 Australian dollars
- Width: 145 mm
- Height: 72.5 mm
- Security features: metallic security thread, Watermark
- Material used: Cotton fibre
- Years of printing: 1966–1987

Obverse
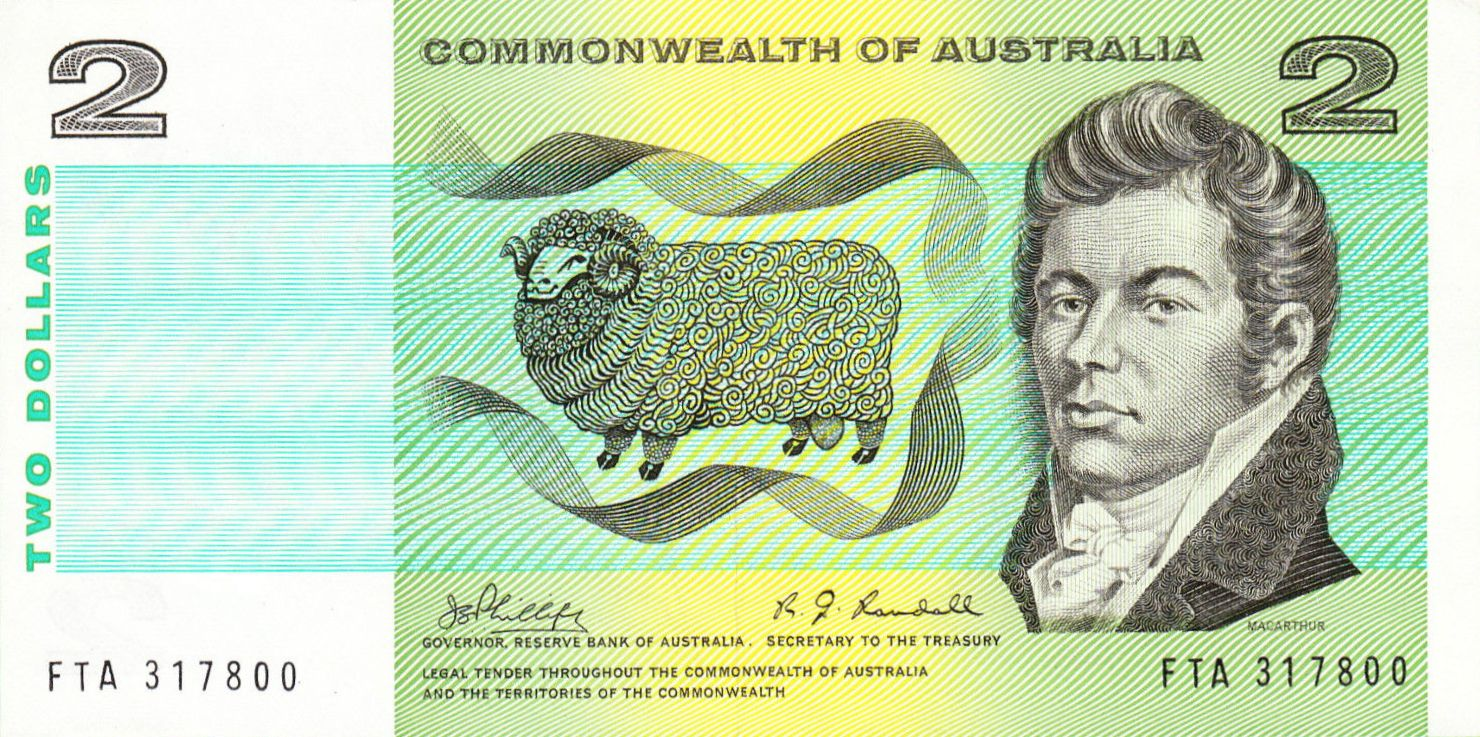
- Design: John Macarthur and Merino sheep
- Designer: Gordon Andrews
- Design date: 1965

Reverse
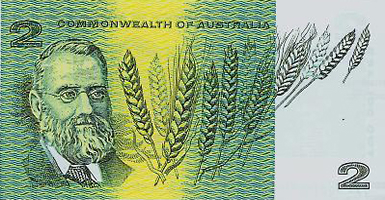
- Design: William Farrer and Wheat
- Designer: Gordon Andrews
- Design date: 1965

The Australian two-dollar note was introduced in 1966 due to decimalisation, to replace the £1 note which had similar green colouration. The note was issued from its introduction in 1966 until its replacement by the two-dollar coin in 1988.

== Security features ==
The paper design included a watermark of Captain James Cook in the white field which was also used in the last issue of pound banknotes. There was a metallic strip, first near the centre of the note, then from 1976 moved to the left side on the obverse of the note.

== Replacement by the coin ==
The two dollar note was replaced by a gold-coloured coin on 14 June 1988 (Monday), due to the longer service life and cost effectiveness of coins. These notes can still be redeemed at face value by the Reserve Bank of Australia and most commercial banks, but numismatics and note collectors may pay a higher price for these notes depending on age and condition.

Preceded by One pound note (Australian)	Two dollars (Australian); 1966–1988	Succeeded by Two dollar coin (Australian)
