= Australian two-dollar coin =

Current denomination of Australian currency

Two Dollars
- Australia
- Value: 2.00 AUD
- Mass: 6.60 g
- Diameter: 20.50 mm
- Thickness: 2.80 mm
- Edge: interrupted milled 20 notches
- Composition: 92% copper, 6% aluminium, 2% nickel
- Years of minting: 1988–present

Obverse
- Design: Queen Elizabeth II (1988–2023); King Charles III (2024–present)
- Designer: Various (1988–2023); Dan Thorne (2024–present)
- Design date: 2024

Reverse
- Design: An Aboriginal Australian elder (based on Gwoja Tjungurrayi)
- Designer: Horst Hahne
- Design date: 1987

The Australian two-dollar coin is the highest-denomination circulating coin of the Australian dollar. It was first issued on 20 June 1988, having been in planning since the mid-1970s. It replaced the Australian two-dollar note due to having a longer circulatory life. The only "mint set only" year was 1991.

$2 coins are legal tender for amounts not exceeding 10 times the face value of the coin for any payment of a debt.

== Design ==
In accordance with all other Australian coins, the obverse features the portrait of the reigning monarch, who during the lifetime of the coin has primarily been Queen Elizabeth II. From 1988 to 1998 the portrait of her was by Raphael Maklouf before being replaced in the following year by one sculpted by Ian Rank-Broadley. Since 2019, the effigy of Elizabeth II by artist Jody Clark has been released into circulation. In 2024, following the death of Queen Elizabeth II in 2022, coins with a new obverse featuring the portrait of King Charles III entered general circulation.

Designed by Horst Hahne, the reverse depicts what is meant to be an archetype of an Aboriginal elder. The drawing was based on Ainslie Roberts' drawing of Gwoya Tjungurrayi, also known as "One Pound Jimmy", a Warlpiri-Anmatyerre man of the Northern Territory of Australia. Tjungarrayi was one of the few survivors of one of the last recognised massacres of Aboriginal people by the British – the 1928 Coniston massacre in what was then the territory of Central Australia. The design also incorporates the Southern Cross and native grasstrees.

Coins produced in 1988 and 1989 bear the initials of its designer, Horst Hahne, but they were removed from the design from 1990 onwards.

All two-dollar coins have been struck at the Royal Australian Mint in Canberra. 160.9 million coins were minted in the first year of issue. It has been issued in all years since except 1991 and 2023, with an average mintage of 22 million coins per annum from 1989 to 2008.

The 2012 Remembrance reverse $2 coin.

In 2012, the Australian mint released the first ever different designed two-dollar coin. It features a poppy flower, with the words Lest we Forget and Remembrance Day in the background of the coin. There had been no commemorative designs for this issue, until the 2012 Remembrance coin was minted. Along with the 2012 Remembrance coin was a coin with the same text and image but the centre poppy was red with a black centre. It was therefore the first coloured circulating coin in Australia.

On 21 June 2013, a third commemorative two-dollar coin was launched by the Royal Australian Mint. This coin, commemorating the 60th anniversary of the coronation of Queen Elizabeth II, featured a purple circle bordering St Edward's Crown.

As a part of the 100 years of Anzac Day a coin programme launched by the Royal Australian Mint, two separate coloured coins were released. The first was released in 2014, it featured two green circles in the middle of the coin and a dove in the centre. The word Remembrance was stretched across the top of the coin. In 2015, the fourth circulating coloured coin in Australia was released. It includes red stripes much like the 2013 Queen Coronation coin. It also features five crosses amongst poppies and the words Lest we Forget in the centre. A fifth coin was also released in 2015. It is sunset orange and it features a sun in the centre with birds and the In Flanders Field poem in the background.

In 2016 a commemorative coin was issued for the Rio Olympic Games. Five coins were issued for circulation through Woolworths supermarkets and were made available in packs of the 5 coins on 27 July 2016. A Paralympic Games coin was issued on 22 August 2016.

The size of the $2 coin was decided after much consideration of the most appropriate size and thickness, as well as security considerations (that could not be imitated by previously-existing coins such as the 5c). However, with an uninterrupted milling on the 5-cent, and the 2 dollars having 5 grooves in 4 lots separated by 7 mm length of the side, identification is easy. It has the same size and milling as the 10 Swedish kronor.

Its smaller size in comparison to the $1 coin can lead to confusion for visitors from outside Australia.

== Minting figures ==
The coin has only been struck at the Royal Australian Mint in Canberra, the nation's capital. The only years without production for general circulation were in 1991 (due to the large number issued for the coin's introduction in 1988) and 2023.

Year	Mintage
1988*	160,900,000
1989*	31,600,000
1990	10,300,000
1991	Produced for Mint Sets Only
1992	15,500,000
1993	4,900,000
1994	22,100,000
1995	15,500,000
1996	13,900,000
1997	19,000,000
1998	8,700,000
1999	27,300,000
2000	5,700,000
2001	35,600,000
2002	29,700,000
2003	13,700,000
2004	20,000,000
2005	45,500,000
2006	40,500,000
2007	26,000,000
2008	47,000,000
2009	74,500,000
2010	36,500,000
2011	1,800,000
2012	5,900,000
2013	35,100,000
2014	39,900,000
2015	22,000,000
2016	12,900,000
2017	16,400,000
2018	14,600,000
2019	IRB Obverse 10,600,000 JC Obverse 2,000,000
2020	16,100,000
2021	13,900,000
2022	32,252,000
2023	Produced for Mint Sets Only
2024	5,202,000
"*" denotes that coins were minted with the designer's initials

=== Commemorative coins ===
Year	Subject	Colours/Features	Mintage
"*" denotes partial numbers – total production to be confirmed
"**" denotes release through Woolworths supermarkets
2012	Remembrance Day - Poppy	Uncoloured Gold Poppy	5,799,000
2012	Remembrance Day - Poppy	Coloured Red Poppy	503,000
2013	60th Anniversary of Queen's Coronation	Purple Ring with crown inside	1,000,000
2014	Remembrance Day - Green Dove	Green Ring with dove inside	1,850,000
2015	Lest We Forget - 100 Years of ANZACs	Red Ring with graves around it	1,460,000
2015	Remembrance Day - In Flanders Fields	Orange Ring with flying birds and the poem 'In Flanders Fields' in background	2,150,000
2016	50th Anniversary of Decimal Currency	Pre-decimal Crown on obverse	2,880,000
2016	2016 Rio Olympics**	Blue Ring	2,000,000 each
2016	2016 Rio Olympics**	Black Ring	2,000,000 each
2016	2016 Rio Olympics**	Red Ring	2,000,000 each
2016	2016 Rio Olympics**	Yellow Ring	2,000,000 each
2016	2016 Rio Olympics**	Green Ring	2,000,000 each
2016	2016 Rio Paralympics**	Green/Yellow/Red/Blue (multicoloured)	2,000,000 each
2017	Lest We Forget - War Memorial Dome	Blue/Green/Yellow Ring depicting Australian War Memorial mosaic	3,900,000
2017	Possum Magic**	Pink/Purple/Orange/Blue Ring with Hush the possum holding a piece of toast with Vegemite.	2,000,000 each
2017	Possum Magic**	Red/Orange/Purple/Yellow/Blue Ring with Hush the possum being happy.	2,000,000 each
2017	Possum Magic**	Blue/Navy/Pink/Orange/Green Ring with Hush the possum hanging from a tree branch.	2,000,000 each
2017	Remembrance Day - Rosemary Wreath	Green/Purple rosemary wreath.	2,100,000
2018	2018 Commonwealth Games**	Red Ring depicting the game's emblem.	2,000,000 each
2018	2018 Commonwealth Games**	Green Ring depicting the Australian Team's logo.	2,000,000 each
2018	2018 Commonwealth Games**	Blue/Green Ring depicts the game's mascot Borobi.	2,000,000 each
2018	Lest We Forget - Eternal Flame	Blue/Orange circular design depicting the eternal flame in the Australian War Memorial.	3,400,000
2018	2018 Invictus Games	A man racing in a wheelchair (uncoloured; gold)	2,100,000
2018	Remembrance Day - 100th Anniversary of the Armistice of 11 November 1918	Red poppy design for the 2nd '0' in the '100' depicted	1,700,000
2019	60th Anniversary of Mr. Squiggle**	Turquoise/Yellow/Red - Mr Squiggle	2,000,000 each
2019	60th Anniversary of Mr. Squiggle**	Yellow/Orange/Green - Bill	2,000,000 each
2019	60th Anniversary of Mr. Squiggle**	Pink/Orange/Green - Gus	2,000,000 each
2019	60th Anniversary of Mr. Squiggle**	Blue/Black/White - Blackboard	2,000,000 each
2019	Remembrance Day - Police Remembrance	Blue/White Ring in Police pattern with crown in centre.	2,000,000 each
2019	Wallabies – 2019 Rugby World Cup**	Green/Gold ring with Wallabies logo in centre	2,000,000 each
2019	Lest We Forget - Repatriation Centenary	Red/Black in ring pattern with a crest in the centre	2,000,000 each
2020	ICC Women's T20 World Cup**	Yellow/Blue/Purple ring with a woman playing cricket	2,000,000 each
2020	2020 Tokyo Olympics**	Blue cherry blossoms in ring pattern	2,000,000 each
2020	2020 Tokyo Olympics**	Black cherry blossoms in ring pattern	2,000,000 each
2020	2020 Tokyo Olympics**	Red cherry blossoms in ring pattern	2,000,000 each
2020	2020 Tokyo Olympics**	Yellow cherry blossoms in ring pattern	2,000,000 each
2020	2020 Tokyo Olympics**	Green cherry blossoms in ring pattern	2,000,000 each
2020	2020 Tokyo Paralympics**	Green/Yellow Ring with the game's mascot	2,000,000 each
2020	Lest We Forget - 75th Anniversary since the end of World War II	White/Dark Green/Dark Blue Ring split into thirds; a star in the centre and dove flies in the background.	600,000
2020	Remembrance Day - Firefighters	Orange flame as firefighters put out a fire	2,000,000
2021	Indigenous Military Service	Blue,Maroon,Black Rings painted in a dotted pattern. A hand is printed in the centre.	2,000,000
2021	Remembrance Day - Ambulance Service	Turquoise spot in the centre; paramedics carry a patient on stretcher	2,000,000
2021	50th Anniversary of the Australian Aboriginal Flag	Circular Black/Red Aboriginal Flag	2,000,000
2021	30th Anniversary of the Wiggles	Red Ring - Captain Feathersword	2,000,000 each
2021	30th Anniversary of the Wiggles	Yellow Ring - Dorothy the Dinosaur	2,000,000 each
2021	30th Anniversary of the Wiggles	Blue Ring - Wags the Dog	2,000,000 each
2021	30th Anniversary of the Wiggles	Purple Ring - Henry the Octopus	2,000,000 each
2022	Remembrance Day - 75th Anniversary of Peacekeeping	Light Blue spot in centre; Dove opens around it	2,000,000
2022	Australia's Frontline workers	White spot in the centre; people holding hands around it	2,000,000
2022	Socceroos Centenary**	Dark Green pattern; soccer ball in centre	1,500,000
2022	Honey Bee	Orange/Yellow ball of honeycomb with bees around it	2,000,000
2022	XXII Birmingham Commonwealth Games - Letter A	Multicoloured Rings of Green/Yellow surrounding letters	2,000,000 each
2022	XXII Birmingham Commonwealth Games - Letter U	Multicoloured Rings of Green/Yellow surrounding letters	2,000,000 each
2022	XXII Birmingham Commonwealth Games - Letter S	Multicoloured Rings of Green/Yellow surrounding letters	2,000,000 each
2023	Vegemite Centenary	Black Ring	1,000,000 each
2023	Vegemite Centenary	Red Ring	1,000,000 each
2023	Vegemite Centenary	Yellow Ring	1,000,000 each
2023	Matildas	Light Green Ring	1,000,000 each
2023	Matildas	Dark Green Ring	1,000,000 each
2023	Matildas	Yellow Ring	1,000,000 each
2024	Remembrance Day - War Animals Remembrance	Purple Poppy with animals surrounding it	2,089,721
2024	2024 Paris Olympics - AllezAus	Multicoloured ring of yellow/dark green surrounding game mascot	1,500,000 each
2024	2024 Paris Olympics - Community	Multicoloured ring of yellow/dark green surrounding Australian Team logo	1,500,000 each
2024	2024 Paris Olympics - Olympism	Multicoloured ring of yellow/dark green surrounding game mascot dancing	1,500,000 each
2024	2024 Paris Olympics - Paralympics	Multicoloured spot of yellow/dark green surrounded by a paralympian	1,500,000 each
2024	NRL	Green Ring surrounding trophy for NRL	1,000,000 each
2024	NRLW	Blue Ring surrounding trophy for NRLW	1,000,000 each
2025	Remembrance Day - 80th Anniversary since the end of World War II	Multicoloured Poppy Wreath	2,001,472
2025	30th Anniversary of the Torres Strait Islander Flag	Circular Coloured Torres Strait Islander Flag	2,087,802
2025	Australian Women's Weekly - Hickory Dickory Watch Birthday Cake	Mutlicoloured Depiction of a Clock/Cake	1,000,000
2025	Australian Open Mens	Dark Blue Tennis Ball in centre with a male tennis player	750,000 each
2025	Australian Open Womens	Light Blue Tennis Ball in centre with a female tennis player	750,000 each
2025	Wallabies	A ring 75% Orange, 25% Dark Green; Male Rugby Players in background	100,000 each
2025	Wallaroos	A ring 75% Dark Green, 25% Orange; Female Rugby Players in background	100,000 each
2026	Lest We Forget - Dawn Service	A soldier with his head bowed towards an orange/white sun in the centre.	1,786,945
2026	Remembrance Day - The Last Post	A soldier blows musical notes next to a purple/orange spot in the centre.	TBA
2026	Matildas	Green Soccer ball in centre	TBA
2026	Australian Bright Ideas	Uncoloured coin depicting Australian Inventions	TBA
2026	Bluey	Bluey's colours in a ring with Bluey in the centre	1,250,000 each
2026	Bingo	Bingo's colours in a ring with Bingo in the centre	1,250,000 each
2026	XIII Glasgow Commonwealth Games	Yellow Spot, Green Star; A man running in athletics	1,000,000 each
2026	XIII Glasgow Commonwealth Games	Green Spot, Yellow Star; A gymmnast is performing	1,000,000 each
2026	XIII Glasgow Commonwealth Games	Blue Spot, Green Star; A paralympist plays wheelchair basketball	1,000,000 each

== See also ==
- Coins of the Australian dollar

Preceded by Two dollar note (Australian)	Two dollars (Australian); 1988–present	Succeeded by Present
