= Early 1990s recession in Australia =

Australian economic downturn

The early 1990s recession saw a period of economic downturn affect much of the world in the late 1980s and early 1990s. The economy of Australia suffered its worst recession since the Great Depression.

== Background ==
Dow Jones (July 1987 through January 1988)

In October 1987, the international Stock Market Slump saw markets crash around the world. The crisis originated when Japan and West Germany pushed up interest rates, pressuring US rates also to rise, triggering a massive sell-off of US shares. Global share prices fell an average of 25%, but Australia saw a 40% decline. 17 of the 18 major OECD economies experienced a recession in the early 1990s.

In the 1980s, Singapore Prime Minister Lee Kuan Yew famously predicted that Australia was at risk of becoming the "white trash of Asia" due to high unemployment, inflationary pressures, and government debt. At the time of the comments, Bob Hawke was Australia's Prime Minister and he stated that the comment was "not an overstatement". The white trash quote is still used today.

In Australia, the Australian Labor Party Government of Bob Hawke came to power in 1983. The Hawke-Keating government shifted the Labor Party from its traditional allegiance to economic protectionism, moved to deregulate Australia's finance industry, and restructured the role of trade unions.

Ian Macfarlane, Governor of the Reserve Bank from 1996 to 2006, has said that the financial excesses of the 1980s were of such a scale that they made the 1990s recession "inevitable", describing Australia's economy at the end of the 1980s as overstretched and vulnerable to contractionary shock. The pressure of high-interest rates on businesses – many of which were "borrowed up to the hilt" – became relentless.

The debate as to the causes or extent to which international factors and domestic government policy contributed to the severity of the 1990s recession in Australia continues. Speaking in 2006, former Reserve bank Governor Ian Macfarlane said:

The emphasis on interest rates and deregulation at least reminds us that what we are dealing with is essentially a financial event. The recession of 1990-91 was dominated by financial failure. In most cases, it was the fall in asset prices that meant that loans could not be repaid, thus transferring the distress to financial institutions.

— Ian Macfarlane, former Governor of the Reserve Bank of Australia, speaking in 2006.

== Response of Hawke government to stock market crash ==
The Hawke Labor government initially responded to the crisis by asking the Conciliation and Arbitration Commission to defer its national wage case. Commodity prices dropped and the Australian dollar sharply declined. The Reserve Bank conducted a $2 billion intervention to hold the dollar at 68c but it crashed to 51c. In December 1987, Keating said that the Australian economy would weather the storm because the Hawke government had already balanced its Budget and brought down inflation.

The Government postponed major policy adjustments, planning a mini-Budget for May. Hawke wrote to US President Reagan calling on the US to reduce its Budget deficit. The Business Council called for wage reductions, decreased government expenditure, a lower dollar, and deregulation of the labour market. Seven months into the crisis, Hawke told the State Premiers that the "savings of Australia must be freed" to go into business investment for export expansion, and funding to the states was cut. A phase-out of tariff protections was continued and company tax was cut by 10% to 39%. In the May mini-Budget, payment to the states was cut by $870 million, and tax cuts were deferred. The Government declared that cost-cutting was completed.

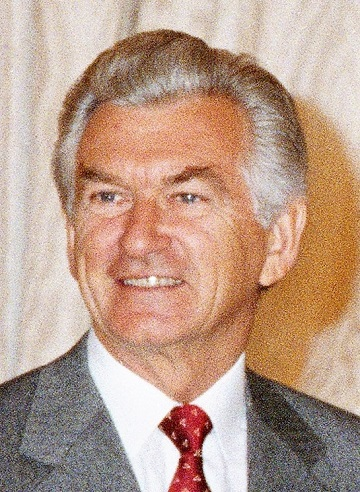
Prime Minister Bob Hawke. The Hawke-Keating government oversaw the economy of Australia during the early 1990s recession.

A surge in commodity prices began in 1986 and assisted the economy to a small 1987 surplus of $2.3 Billion. With commodity prices now over their peak, economic conditions were entering a decline, with high-interest rates, a growing current account deficit, declining demand, increasing foreign debt, and a wave of corporate collapses. Furthermore, the collapse of the Eastern Bloc economies was to see wool and wheat prices decline, savaging Australia's agricultural sector.

=== "The recession we had to have" ===
Treasurer Paul Keating budgeted a record $9.1 billion surplus for 1989–90, and Labor won the 1990 election, aided by the support of environmentalists. To court the green vote, environment minister Graham Richardson had placed restrictions on mining (notably uranium mining) and logging which had a detrimental effect on already rising unemployment. David Barnett wrote in 1997 that Labor fiscal policy at this time was "self-defeating" as "with one hand it was imposing a monetary squeeze, while on the other it was encouraging spending with wage increases and tax cuts".

By July 1990, Australia had entered a severe recession. Initially, the Treasurer had insisted Australia would face a "soft landing", but after receiving the September quarter accounts indicating a large contraction of 1.6 per cent, he adopted a different political strategy, instead arguing that the downturn was a necessary correction by opening a press conference in November as follows:

Well, I’ll just give you a few comments on the national accounts. The first thing to say is that the accounts do show that Australia is in a recession. The most important thing about that is… this is the recession that Australia had to have. – Treasurer Paul Keating, November 1990.

The remark has continued to spark debate as to the extent of Keating's responsibility for the depth of the Recession. Former Reserve Bank Governor Ian Macfarlane has said that policymakers did not "set out to have a recession in order to reduce inflation. The recession happened because of the unwinding of the excesses of the 1980s, the international recession of the early 1990s, and the high-interest rates". High-interest rates were employed to slow the asset price boom of 1988–89. Treasurer Keating, the Reserve Bank, and Treasury itself generally agreed on the need for high-interest rates in 1989 and the pace of their reduction.

The popularity of Hawke's prime ministership, along with the health of the Hawke-Keating political partnership deteriorated along with the Australian economy and Keating began to position himself for a challenge. The Government promised economic recovery for 1991 and launched a series of asset sales to increase revenue. GDP sank, unemployment rose, revenue collapsed and welfare payments surged.

According to former Reserve Bank Governor Ian Macfarlane:

The recession started in the September quarter of 1990 and lasted until the September quarter of 1991. During the recession, GDP fell by 1.7 percent, employment by 3.4 percent and the unemployment rate rose to 10.8 percent. Like all recessions, it was a period of disruption and economic distress. It was particularly deep in Victoria, where a disproportionate share of the financial failure occurred. Victorian employment fell by 8.5 percent compared with a fall of 2.1 percent for the rest of Australia.

— Ian Macfarlane, former Governor of the Reserve Bank of Australia, speaking in 2006.

Reforms were conducted between 1990 and 1991, with Australia's telecommunications opened to competition; and tariffs were reduced to five percent, while the phasing out of textile, clothing, and motor vehicle protection began.

A slow recovery from the recession began around the September quarter in 1991, though unemployment continued to rise until late 1992.

== Financial crises and collapses ==
A number of financial institutions failed around Australia, including the State Bank of Victoria, the State Bank of South Australia, the Teachers Credit Union of Western Australia, the Pyramid Building Society as well as several merchant banks, a mortgage trust, and a friendly society.

In 1990, Victoria's Pyramid Building Society collapsed with debts in excess of $2 billion. With Victoria deeply in debt, Labor Premier John Cain resigned and Joan Kirner was elevated to the post of Premier of Victoria. Melbourne businessman Christopher Skase's business empire crashed spectacularly and he fled to Majorca in Spain. The Liberal-National Coalition, led by Jeff Kennett was swept into office in a 1992 landslide victory and commenced a wide-ranging program of expenditure cuts, privatisation of public assets, and economic reform to reduce government debt and rejuvenate the economy.

The State Bank of South Australia, owned by the Government of South Australia, collapsed in 1991. The bank had been a beneficiary of the commercial property boom of the 1980s, but by February 1991 the Bannon Labor government had to launch a $970 million bailout due to its bad debts, and the bank's debts soon reached $3 billion. Premier Bannon resigned after appearing at a Royal Commission into the affair.

With Western Australia suffering at the end of the 1980s boom, the Labor Party replaced Premier Brian Burke firstly with Peter Dowding and then Carmen Lawrence; the subsequent WA Inc investigation saw Burke jailed. West Australian high flying businessman Alan Bond was declared bankrupt in 1992 and jailed in 1997 for corporate fraud.

== Response of the Federal Opposition ==
The Opposition Liberal Party of Australia turned to economist John Hewson as its new leader. Hewson argued that the nation was in an economic crisis. He said the Hawke-Keating government had increased the severity of the recession by initially encouraging the economy to boom post-stock crash as elections were approaching, which necessitated higher interest rates and tighter monetary policy than would otherwise have been necessary. Hewson called for a radical reform program and formulated a package that included a consumption tax policy and industrial relations reform to address the poor economic situation. The Fightback! policy was launched in November 1991. The comprehensive plan further destabilised Hawke's leadership.

== Keating government ==
As Treasurer in 1990, Paul Keating famously described the 1990s recession as "the recession we had to have". He challenged Bob Hawke for the leadership of the Labor Party in 1991 and became Prime Minister of Australia.

The ACTU campaigned for a wage increase. Hawke brokered an increase for waterside workers and public servants. By April 1991, unemployment was nearing 10% and rising. On 3 June, Keating challenged Hawke for the leadership of Labor, but lost the vote and became a destabilising presence on the back bench. The new treasurer, John Kerin and Deputy Prime Minister Brian Howe blamed Keating's 1990 economic policy for the poor state of the Australian economy. Industrial Relations Minister Peter Cook indicated an intention to introduce a more flexible wage system. In his July budget, Kerin forecast a deficit of $4.7 billion. In a press conference, Kerin was unable to recall what GOS—Gross Operating Surplus—stood for. In December, shortly before Keating's successful second challenge against Hawke, Kerin was removed as Treasurer and appointed Minister for Transport and Communications and the Minister for Finance, Ralph Willis, became Treasurer. Hawke attributed the change to a loss of confidence in communication.

By 1992, shortly after Hawke lost office and was replaced as leader of the Labor Party and as prime minister by his former deputy Paul Keating, unemployment had reached 11 percent, the highest level in Australia since the Great Depression of the 1930s. Australia had faced eight quarters of declining economic growth. The new prime minister, Paul Keating, placed emphasis on expanding ties to Asia as a means of securing Australia's economic future and tied this to a cultural agenda of reducing ties to traditional allies.

In February 1992, the Keating government released the One Nation policy, designed to target job creation. The government introduced the Australian National Training Authority Act 1992 and the Disability Discrimination Act 1992, which it hoped would assist the disabled to remain productive and off welfare. By the close of 1992, unemployment was still rising, but growth had improved.

Keating called an election for March 1993. He promised company tax rate and personal income tax cuts (the "L-A-W tax cuts") and campaigned heavily against the John Hewson-led Opposition's proposal for a Goods and Services Tax. Despite the economic conditions, Keating led Labor to victory. With an ever-rising deficit, however, Keating was unable to deliver the tax cuts promised prior to the election and sought to reduce expenditure.

In May 1994, the government launched a five-year economic plan entitled Working Nation. By the end of the year, inflation had declined, growth continued to improve and unemployment was again below 10%.

== Aftermath ==
Following the early 1990s recession, Australia experienced a record period of economic growth, with no recession until 2020 due to COVID-19.

After this recession, the RBA moved towards inflation targeting rather than aiming to manage the Current Account Deficit, with the (previously controversial) Pitchford Thesis becoming more accepted.

Speaking in 2006, former Reserve Bank Governor Ian Macfarlane said that a beneficial legacy of the 1990s recession was a lasting reduction in inflation.

The Liberal-National Coalition government of John Howard was elected in a landslide victory in 1996. It reduced government expenditure, prioritised a return to Budget surplus, and instigated anti-union industrial relations reforms. Following the 1998 Election, introduced a revised Goods and Services Tax. Inflation and interest rates fell. Between 1996 and 2005, unemployment fell from over 8% to 5%. To strengthen the financial reporting framework for the financial sector, the Howard government introduced the Corporations Act 2001 and Corporate Law Economic Reform Program Act 2004, following the recommendations in the Report of the HIH Insurance Royal Commission released in April 2003.
