= Philip Lowe =

Australian economist

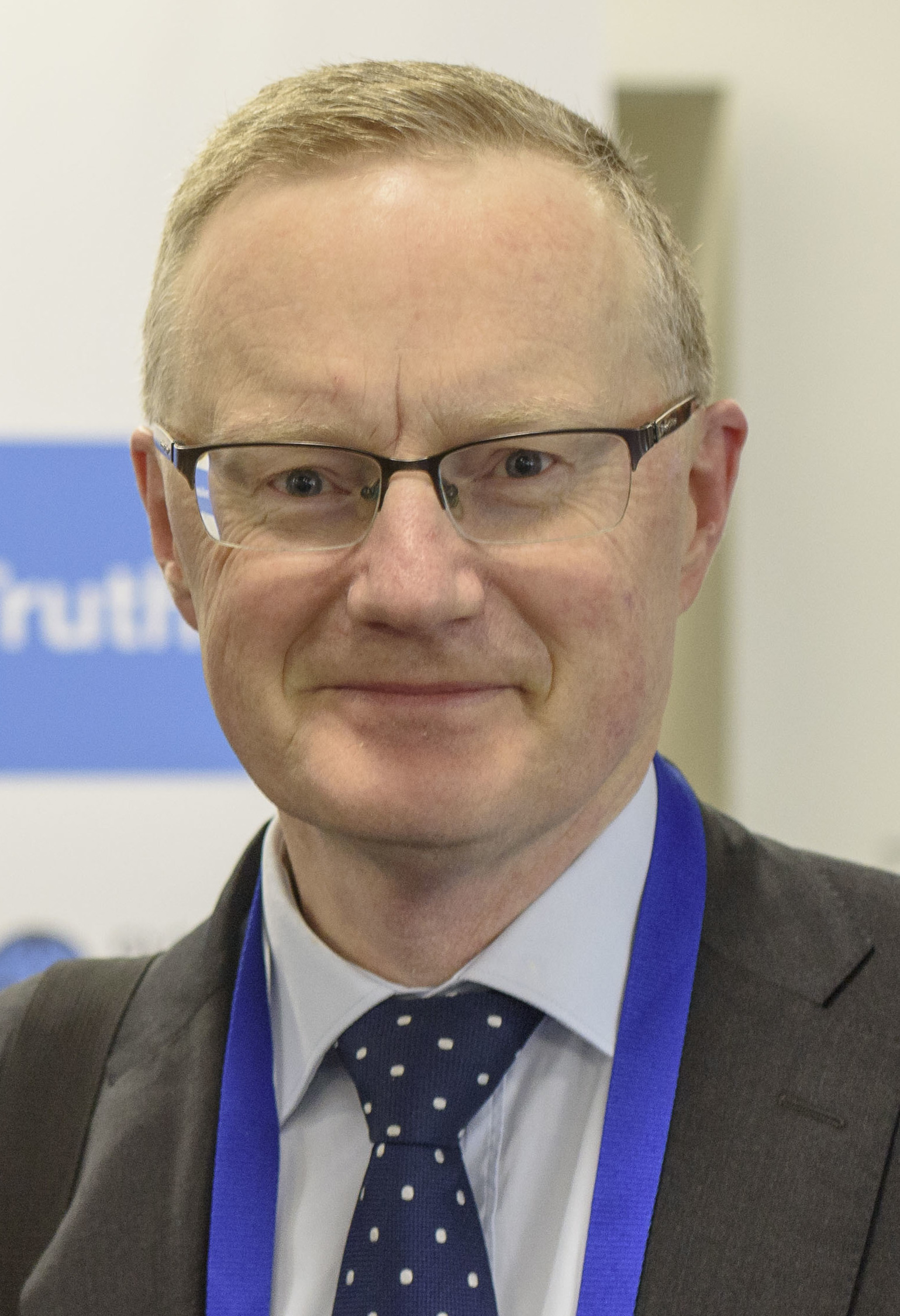
- Lowe in 2017

8th Governor of the Reserve Bank of Australia
- In office 18 September 2016 – 17 September 2023
- Nominated by: Scott Morrison
- Deputy: Guy Debelle (2016–2022); Michele Bullock (2022–2023)
- Preceded by: Glenn Stevens
- Succeeded by: Michele Bullock

Personal details
- Born: 4 October 1961 (age 65) Wagga Wagga, New South Wales, Australia
- Spouse: Jocelyn Parker
- Children: 3
- Education: University of New South Wales (BCom); Massachusetts Institute of Technology (PhD)

Philip Lowe (born 4 October 1961) is an Australian economist and former Governor of the Reserve Bank of Australia, from September 2016 to September 2023. He was also deputy governor under Glenn Stevens from February 2012 to September 2016.

== Early life and education ==
Lowe was born in Wagga Wagga, New South Wales. He was the eldest of five children. He attended St Michael's High School and Trinity Senior High School. Lowe later moved to Sydney and was hired by the RBA straight out of high school. He was initially employed as a clerical worker in 1980 at the age of 17, while completing his undergraduate commerce degree at the University of New South Wales by attending night classes. He was awarded first-class honours and the University Medal on his graduation in 1985.

Lowe later completed a doctorate in 1994 at the Massachusetts Institute of Technology (MIT), with Paul Krugman as his adviser.

== Career ==
Lowe started working at the Bank at age 18.

In 1997, Lowe was appointed head of the RBA's Economic Research Department. He later headed the bank's Financial Stability Department (from 1999 to 2000), the Domestic Markets Department (from 2002 to 2003), and the Economic Analysis Department (from 2003 to 2004). From 2000 to 2002, Lowe worked at the Bank for International Settlements in Switzerland, as head of its Financial Institutions and Infrastructure Division. He was made Assistant Governor (Financial System) at the RBA in 2004, and Assistant Governor (Economic) in 2009, eventually becoming Deputy Governor in 2012. In May 2016, Scott Morrison (the Treasurer of Australia) announced that Lowe would succeed Glenn Stevens at the head of the RBA at the end of his term in September 2016. According to the Reserve Bank's 2019 Annual Report, Lowe received a base salary of $911,728 and superannuation contributions of $116,962 as governor.

In 2023 an independent review of the RBA was conducted. The report noted that Philip Lowe was responsible for trading losses of between AU$30 billion and AU$58 billion as a result of the RBA's bond purchase program and term funding facility. These losses left the Reserve Bank technically insolvent and as a result Lowe and the Federal Treasurer agreed to halt all dividends to Australian tax payers until the Reserve Bank returned to positive equity, estimated to take until at least 2032.

The report also noted that the processes for the initial assessment and ongoing monitoring of the interest rate risks associated with the bond purchase program and term funding facility "were incomplete" and "did not pay sufficient attention to the risks posed to the RBA's earnings" and did not contain the necessary scenario analysis for increases in interest rates.

Lowe has attracted controversies for a number of his comments during his tenure as Governor of the Reserve Bank of Australia. At the Australian Financial Review business summit in 2021, Lowe indicated that the RBA would not raise the Official cash rate until 2024 but this decision was changed in May 2022 when the cash rate target was raised by 0.25 percentage points. Following the rises in the official cash rate, Lowe apologised in November 2022 stating he was "sorry that people listened to what we've said and acted on that, and now find themselves in a position they don't want to be in."

In May 2023 during an Australian Senate Economics Legislation Committee (Budget Estimates) hearing, Lowe suggested that the housing market was one of the biggest drivers of the Consumer price index that has contributed to Inflation and to reduce demand, people should be sharing more dwellings or living with their parents for longer which attracted controversy on social media and media sources.

On 7 June 2023 at the Morgan Stanley Australia Summit in Sydney following another OCR rise, Lowe said people should reduce spending and find additional work to maintain the cost of living which also attracted similar attention to previous comments.

It was revealed in March 2023 that in 1997 Lowe received a taxpayer-subsidised home loan for his five bedroom residence in Randwick, New South Wales, the time he was appointed the head of the RBA's Economics Research Department. The property was bought for over $1 million assisted by a half-price loan from the RBA with the interest rate being locked at half the standard variable rate by Commonwealth Bank customers under the scheme at the time. A spokesperson for the RBA confirmed that Lowe had repaid all his loans and all financial disclosures were correct. Lowe's term as governor of the RBA concluded on 17 September 2023. In March 2024, Lowe joined the board of Future Generation Australia as an independent director and became its chair after the company's annual general meeting in May.

== Personal life ==
Lowe is married and has three children. He met his wife, Jocelyn Parker, who works at the Australian Prudential Regulation Authority, while working at the RBA.

Business positions
| Preceded by Glenn Stevens | Governor of the Reserve Bank of Australia; 18 September 2016 – 17 September 2023 | Succeeded by Michele Bullock |
