= Governor Bullock =

Governor Bullock may refer to:

- Alexander Bullock (1816–1882), 26th Governor of Massachusetts
- George Bullock (British Army officer) (1851–1926), Governor of Bermuda from 1912 to 1917
- Michele Bullock (born 1962/1963), governor of the Reserve Bank of Australia from 2023 to present
- Rufus Bullock (1834–1907), 46th Governor of Georgia
- Steve Bullock (American politician) (born 1966), 24th Governor of Montana

== See also ==
- Archibald Bulloch (1730–1777), 1st governor of Georgia
