= Governor Knight =

Governor Knight may refer to:

- Goodwin Knight (1896–1970), 31st Governor of California
- H. M. Knight (1919–2015), 3rd Governor of the Reserve Bank of Australia
- Nehemiah R. Knight (1780–1854), 9th Governor of Rhode Island
