= University of New England (Australia) =

Public university in New South Wales, Australia

- Coat of arms
- Former names: New England University College of the University of Sydney (1938–1954)
- Motto: Latin: Ex sapientia modus
- Motto in English: "Out Of Wisdom Comes Moderation"
- Type: Public research university
- Established: 1 January 1938; 88 years ago
- Accreditation: TEQSA
- Academic affiliations: RUN; OUA; UA
- Visitor: Governor of New South Wales (ex officio)
- Chancellor: David van Aanholt (Acting)
- Vice-Chancellor: Chris Moran
- Faculty: 661 (2023)
- Administrative staff: 714 (2023)
- Total staff: 1,375 (2023)
- Students: 21,962 (2023)
- Undergraduates: 14,252 (2023)
- Postgraduates: 5,459 (2023)
- Doctoral students: 531 (2023)
- Other students: 531 non-award (2023)
- Location: Elm Avenue, Armidale, New South Wales, 2350, Australia; 30.4867°S 151.6430°E
- Campus: 74 hectares (180 acres); Rural
- Colours: Green Black
- Website: une.edu.au

The University of New England (UNE) is a public university in the New England region of the state of New South Wales, Australia. Founded in 1938, it was the first Australian university to be established outside of a state capital. Its main campus is located in the regional city of Armidale mid-way between Sydney and Brisbane. As of 2023, the university had approximately 22,000 students, of which 82.8% were online and 17.2% on campus.

In the 2019 Student Experience Survey, UNE recorded the sixth-highest student satisfaction rating out of all Australian universities, and the highest student satisfaction rating out of all public universities in New South Wales, with an overall satisfaction rating of 83.2. The university ranks lower in research-based rankings of Australian universities.

== History ==
=== Establishment ===
Calls for tertiary education to be extended outside of Sydney began in earnest after World War I. Local MP David Drummond led a delegation to the state government in the early 1920s lobbying for a university college in Armidale. A 1924 New South Wales royal commission, chaired by John Jacob Cohen, recommended that consideration be given to a rural university and the Armidale Teachers' College was established in 1928. An organised push to establish a university in New England began in the early 1930s, at the height of the New England statehood movement which sought separation of the region from New South Wales and its admission as a new Australian state. Prominent early advocates in addition to Drummond included Colin Sinclair, Earle Page, and Victor Thompson.

A provisional council to raise funds for a university in New England was established in 1934. The New England University College was established in Armidale in 1938 as a child of the University of Sydney, with Page the chairman of the inaugural advisory council. The college became fully independent as the University of New England in 1954, after the entry into force of the University of New England Act 1953 (NSW). The university established a faculty of education in 1967.

=== Transition to a network university ===
UNE underwent a major restructuring in 1989 with the University of New England Act 1989 (NSW), transitioning into a network university with multiple locations. These consisted of a campus at Armidale, which incorporated the former University of New England and the Armidale College of Advanced Education; and a campus at Lismore, incorporating the former Northern Rivers College of Advanced Education.

In 1990, the Orange Agricultural College joined the university. The network also included the UNE-Coffs Harbour Centre, which provided courses from within academic departments of the Armidale and Lismore campuses.

=== Return to campus format ===
In November 1993, UNE was re-formed once again, with the passage of the University of New England Act 1993 (NSW) and the Southern Cross University Act 1993 (NSW) through the New South Wales Parliament. This legislation had the effect of dismantling the network university. From 1994 UNE had only one campus, at Armidale. A new university, (Southern Cross University), was created with campuses in Lismore and Coffs Harbour. The Orange campus was amalgamated with the University of Sydney.

The amalgamation of the former Armidale College of Advanced Education was complete by the time of the new legislation. In the same year, a law school was established.

=== 2020s ===
In 2020, the University of New England was impacted by the COVID-19 pandemic. Early in the year, the university became a potential exposure site, and students and faculty underwent viral tests. In September of that year, a staff restructuring was announced, with the goal of saving $20 million annually in wage costs and preparing the university for future opportunities, at the expense of 100 positions.

== Campuses and buildings ==
The University is on several sites in Armidale. The northern campus is five kilometres to the northwest of the city centre, in a rural and bushland setting. Part of this campus includes the original property presented by T R Forster to the University of Sydney for the establishment of a University College. This property comprised the old homestead, 'Booloominbah', with several other buildings and 74 hectares of land. Since the original gift, other benefactors have presented properties to the university, whose Armidale site now comprises some 260 hectares.

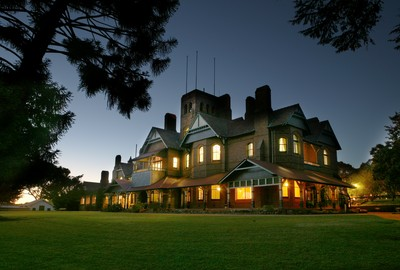
Booloominbah Homestead at night

Booloominbah and the vice-chancellor's residence Trevenna were designed by architect John Horbury Hunt.

The Newling campus of the university includes the Newling Centre, home to the New England Conservatorium of Music, and other buildings associated with the former Armidale College of Advanced Education.

The university possesses rural properties close to the campus, providing facilities for teaching and research. In addition, there are the 'Tullimba' rural research property at Kingstown and the Douglas McMaster Rural Research Station at Warialda.

The University of New England has one of the most extensive residential college systems in Australia. Around half of UNE's on campus students live in one of the colleges.

The university has a metro campus, UNE Sydney, set at the hearth of Parramatta CBD. As stated on their website "The campus is designed to meet the learning and support needs for our predominately online city-based students and on-campus international students in select courses".

The university has small campuses in Tamworth (UNE Tamworth) and Taree (UNE Taree), as well as a network of regional study centres in north-west New South Wales and in the New England region.

In 2020, the university revealed plans to construct a larger campus in Tamworth by 2031.

== Governance and structure ==
=== Chancellor and Vice-Chancellor ===
David van Aanholt is currently serving as Acting Chancellor.

Chris Moran has been Vice-Chancellor since 2023.

=== Faculties and departments ===
The research and teaching staff are divided into three faculties that together contain nine multi-disciplinary schools.

- Faculty of Humanities, Arts, Social Sciences and Education
  - School of Humanities, Arts and Social Sciences
  - School of Education
- Faculty of Science, Agriculture, Business and Law
  - School of Environmental and Rural Science
  - School of Science and Technology
  - School of Law
  - UNE Business School
- Faculty of Medicine and Health
  - School of Health
  - School of Psychology
  - School of Rural Medicine

The university offers over 200 programs in 23 discipline areas.

The field of peace studies has historically been a focus within UNE, commencing in 1982. The University offers majors in peace studies at undergraduate level, as well as research higher degrees in peace studies. in 2026, the peace studies programme at UNE was accepted as a partner in the Global Campaign for Peace Education.

== Coat of arms ==
Coat of arms of the University of New England
Adopted Granted by the Kings of Arms, 20 May 1955. Crest On a Wreath Or and Vert, issuant from a Coronet composed of sprigs of Wattle Vert fructed Or and Acorns also Vert set alternately upon a Rim also Or, a Cresset Sable enflamed Gold. Helm A closed Helmet, mantled Vert doubled Or. Escutcheon Azure, a Cross Or surmounted of an open Book proper bound and clasped Sable edged of the second, in the first quarter a representation of the Constellation of the Southern Cross, on a Chief Gold three Tudor Roses Argent on Gules barbed and seeded also proper. Supporters On either side a Lion guardant Or each gorged with a Cord tasselled Vert pendent therefrom a Bugle Horn Sable garnished Gold. Compartment A field of Grass Vert. Motto Latin: Ex Sapientia Modus ("Out Of Wisdom Comes Moderation") Symbolism The name of the university and the surrounding area (New England) inspires emblems of both Australia and England, with the Southern Cross, and the Tudor Rose in the escutcheon, and the sprigs of Wattle and acorns of English oak trees in the coronet of the crest. The gold lion supporters also represent England, while the green and gold colours of the arms represent the national colours of Australia. The black hunting horns and the green cord on the lions are taken from the family arms of Thomas Richmond Forster, one of the founders of the university who also donated Booloominbah and surrounding land for its establishment as a university college in 1937. The black flaming Cresset in the crest and the open book in the escutcheon represent learning and enlightenment. The motto is taken from Agricola (4.5) by Roman writer Tacitus, and was adopted in 1954 by the university council at the suggestion of two lecturers from the Department of Classics, Frank Letters and John Duhigg.

== Academic profile ==
=== Research and publications ===
UNE undertakes fundamental and applied research in many disciplines. Its scholars and scientists have established international reputations through their contributions in areas such as rural science, agricultural economics, educational administration, linguistics and archaeology. Collaborative research with other institutions includes projects with the CSIRO and the high-profile Cooperative Research Centres. Through its research UNE seeks to assist in the economic, social and cultural advancement of Australia and in the advanced training of undergraduate and postgraduate students.

UNE's principal research flagship is animal genetics and livestock breeding, which is serviced by the Animal Genetics and Breeding Unit (AGBU) and delivered commercially by the Agricultural Business Research Institute (ABRI).

Other research flagships include: Rural Education which is undertaken by the National Centre of Science, Information and Communication Technology, and Mathematics Education for Rural and Regional Australia (SiMERR) Rural Communities, Landscapes and Practices which is led by the Institute for Rural Futures (IRF).

Other targeted areas of research include:

- Environmental and Agricultural Change: Climate Change Adaptation and Mitigation; Marine and Freshwater Biodiversity; Terrestrial Biodiversity; Natural Resource Management; Rural Futures; Australian Fauna; Vegetation Research; Sustainable Agriculture; Agricultural Genetics; Animal Research
- Rural Health: Rural Medicine; Health Services Management; Bioactive Materials; Health Psychology; Gender, Health and Sexuality
- Rural and Regional Education: School Science and Mathematics Education; School English and Literacy Education; Special Education and Diversity in Schools
- Economics and Public Policy: Agricultural Economics; Applied Economics and Policy; Local Government; Business and Management; Higher Education Management and Policy
- Asia Pacific Region : Failing States – Rising States; Empowering People, Developing Infrastructure; Conflict and Governance; Peace Studies; Migration
- Frontiers and Boundaries: Australia's Regional Frontiers; The Arts, Media, Culture and Society; Ancient Societies; Language and Cognition; Believing and Thinking; Mathematics, Nonlinear and Complex Analysis
- Law: Natural Resources Law and Policy; Law and Institutional Arrangements for Rural Communities
- Security: Crime, Criminology and Justice; Biosecurity; IT Security
- Water Perspectives: Water through History – Water Stories; Water Policy; Water Resources

=== Lecture series ===
==== Frank Archibald Memorial Lecture ====
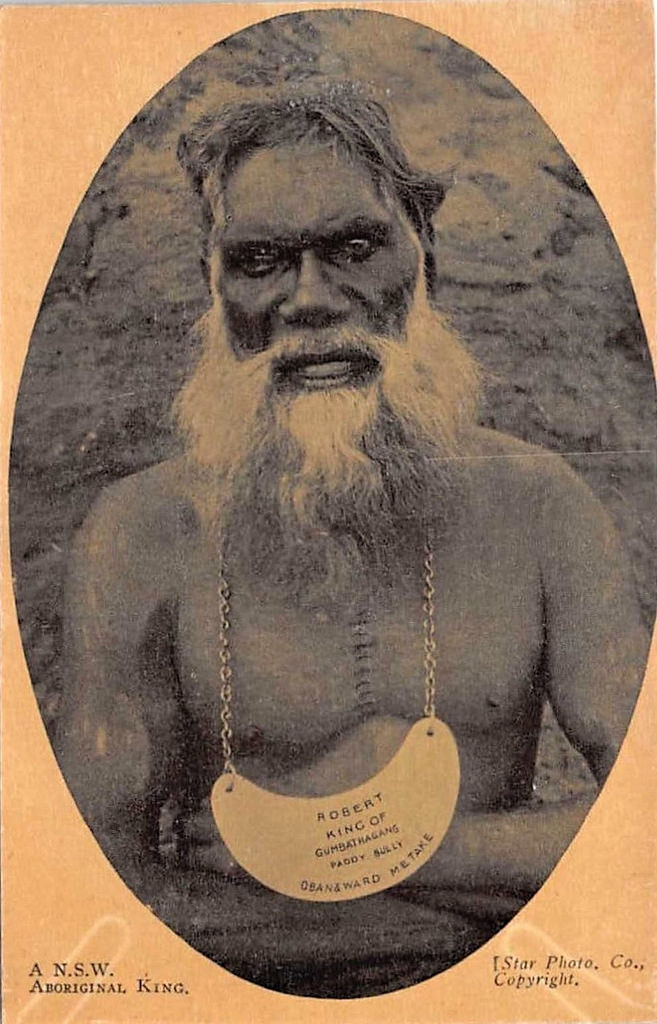
Robert, King of Gumbathagang tribe, c.1900

The Frank Archibald Memorial Lecture Series is named in honour of Frank Archibald, aka "Bubba", an Aboriginal man who was born in Oban, near Guyra, in 1885 and died on 18 October 1975. He was the eldest grandson of "King Robert" (aka "King Bobby", "King Malawangi", "King Billy" or Robert/Billy/Bobby King), whose photo hangs in the Armidale Museum.

As a revered elder, Archibald could speak seven different Aboriginal languages and understand another two, as well as speaking English. His surname derives from his Scottish father. He was of the Gumbangeri people on his mother's side, but was also initiated into his wife Sarah Morris's people, the Dhungatti nation. A Catholic priest, Father Kelly, helped Archibald to build a house, completed in 1957, in which many relatives came to live. Archibald was revered by the Armidale Koori and community for his knowledge of so many Aboriginal issues, particularly in the education of his people and others.

The Frank Archibald Memorial Lecture was founded by Lynette Riley, with the inaugural lecture given in 1986 by Eric Willmot. Since then, speakers have included:

- Charles Perkins (1990)
- Mick Dodson (1994)
- Linda Burney (1996)
- Pat O'Shane (1998)
- Jackie Huggins (2001)
- Aden Ridgeway (2004)
- Lou Bennett (2018)
- Ken Wyatt (2019)
- Michelle Trudgett (2020)
- Peter Anderson (2022)
- Stan Grant (2024)

=== Academic reputation ===
University rankings

Global – Overall
- CWTS World: 1088 (Note: The CWTS Leiden Ranking is based on P (top 10%).) (2024)
- QS World: 1001–1200 (2026)
- USNWR Global: =919 (25/26)

National – Overall
- CWTS National: 30 (2024)
- ERA National: 26 (2018)
- QS National: 35 (2026)
- USNWR National: 33 (25/26)
- AFR National: 38 (2025)

National publications

In the Australian Financial Review Best Universities Ranking 2025, the university was ranked #38 amongst Australian universities.

Global publications

In the 2026 Quacquarelli Symonds World University Rankings (published 2025), the university attained a position of #1001-1200 (35th nationally).

In the 2025–2026 U.S. News & World Report Best Global Universities, the university attained a tied position of #919 (33rd nationally).

In the CWTS Leiden Ranking 2024, the university attained a position of #1088 (30th nationally).

=== Student outcomes ===
The Australian Government's QILT (Note: Abbreviation for Quality Indicators for Learning and Teaching.) conducts national surveys documenting the student life cycle from enrolment through to employment. These surveys place more emphasis on criteria such as student experience, graduate outcomes and employer satisfaction than perceived reputation, research output and citation counts.

In the 2023 Employer Satisfaction Survey, graduates of the university had an overall employer satisfaction rate of 85.9%.

In the 2023 Graduate Outcomes Survey, graduates of the university had a full-time employment rate of 89.2% for undergraduates and 90.2% for postgraduates. The initial full-time salary was A$75,300 for undergraduates and A$87,800 for postgraduates.

In the 2023 Student Experience Survey, undergraduates at the university rated the quality of their entire educational experience at 81.4% meanwhile postgraduates rated their overall education experience at 78.4%.

== Student life ==
Neucleus cover from June 2005

=== Student union ===
UNE's student body began in 1940, and is currently encapsulated by the University of New England Students' Association.

=== Student newspaper ===
Neucleus is a student newspaper published at the University of New England. The magazine was first printed in 1947 and is produced by University of New England Students' Association.

=== Residential colleges ===
The University of New England has one of the most extensive residential college systems in Australia. Around half of UNE's on-campus students live in one of the colleges.

As at 2025, the residential colleges are:

- Austin Page College (Formed by merging Austin College and Earle Page College)
- Duval College
- Mary White College
- Robb College
- Wright College & Village

== Notable people ==
=== Notable alumni ===
As of 2011, more than 106,000 people hold qualifications from UNE, with many in senior positions in Australia and overseas. There is an active alumni network which contributes to the university, enabling the institution to continue expanding its work and offerings.

Notable alumni include:

- Chris Minns, Premier of New South Wales (Bachelor of Arts)
- Michele Bullock, Governor of the Reserve Bank of Australia (Bachelor of Economics (Honours))
- Bernie Fraser, former Governor of the Reserve Bank of Australia and former Secretary of the Department of the Treasury (Bachelor of Arts (Economics))
- Lieutenant General Simon Stuart, Chief of the Australian Army

== Controversies ==
According to a 2017 Australian Human Rights Commission report based on optional surveys given to students, UNE had the highest reported rate of sexual assaults at universities in Australia, with 4% of respondents saying they had been sexually assaulted; the average rate across all universities was 1.6%. Under a previous 2016 freedom of information request UNE had reported there were 22 officially reported cases of sexual assaults on campus over the previous five years, resulting in two expulsions, no suspensions and seven warnings. In February 2017 vice-chancellor Annabelle Duncan said that past UNE policies dealing with sexual harassment did not allow management to handle some cases satisfactorily.

On 1 August 2022, the incumbent Vice-Chancellor, Professor Brigid Heywood, was charged with allegedly assaulting a teenage girl at a club in Armidale on 8 March. Heywood was issued with an attendance notice to appear at Armidale Local Court on 26 September. On 5 August, UNE accepted her resignation. The assault charges were withdrawn at trial in May 2025 with Heywood pleading guilty to offensive behaviour, but the trial judge ruled that no conviction be recorded.

== See also ==
- List of universities in Australia
- University of New England Students' Association
- TUNE! FM
- SiMERR
