= Bob Johnston (economist) =

Australian economist (1924–2023)

Robert Johnston AC

4th Governor of the Reserve Bank of Australia
- In office August 1982 – July 1989
- Preceded by: H. M. Knight
- Succeeded by: Bernie Fraser

Personal details
- Born: 19 July 1924 Melbourne, Victoria, Australia
- Died: 20 March 2023 (aged 98)
- Profession: Economist

Robert Alan Johnston AC (19 July 1924 – 20 March 2023) was an Australian economist who served as the 4th Governor of the Reserve Bank of Australia.

Born in Moonee Ponds in Melbourne, Victoria. He attended Essendon High School and served in Southeast Asia during World War II as part of the Air Force. Johnston was behind the introduction of the polymer banknote technology.

Johnston died on 20 March 2023, at the age of 98.

Government offices
Preceded by H. M. Knight	Governor of the Reserve Bank of Australia; 1982–1989	Succeeded by Bernie Fraser
