= TUNE! FM =

TuneFM
- Australia
- Broadcast area: Armidale, New South Wales, Australia
- Frequency: 106.9 MHz FM

Programming
- Format: Contemporary/Independent/Youth

Ownership
- Owner: University of New England

History
- First air date: 27 April 1970
- Call sign meaning: 2 – NSW UNE – University of New England

Technical information
- ERP: 10W

Links
- Website: Tunefm Dot Net

TuneFM (ACMA callsign: 2UNE) is the University of New England's (UNE) campus radio station, a high power open narrowcasting service operated by UNELife in Armidale, Australia. Founded in 1970, the station is Australia’s oldest university broadcaster, serving UNE’s students, staff, and the broader Armidale community.

== History ==
TuneFM has a colourful history of broadcasting, both legally and illegally. Its inception dates back to 1968 when a group of five students called the UNE Radio Committee presented a prerecorded, half-hour radio show each week on Armidale's local commercial station, 2AD. With the support of this group, Professor Neville Fletcher of the UNE Physics Department approached the Postmaster-General's Department and presented the idea of establishing a service similar to those emerging on university campuses in the United States. After considering this novel idea, the Postmaster-General wrote on 14 January 1969 to say a licence would be issued. The licence allowed the station to operate a 'closed-loop' system with micro-transmitters located in each of the eight residential colleges on campus.

After overcoming technical and operational hurdles, Radio UNE (RUNE) began test transmissions on 1630 kHz on the AM band in March 1970. The station was officially opened at 7pm on 27 April that year, with a pre-recorded message from the Vice Chancellor, Professor Zelman Cowen who oversaw the license application. Richard "Swinging Dick" Mutton, Station Manager, introduced the first music track, Harry Nilsson's Everybody's Talking. Operating on only a yearly budget of about $3000, the initial construction of the station was an impressive example of passionate student motivation and community spirit. The studio desk was built from scraps by one volunteer, another student did the electrical wiring and one especially committed staff member even built a studio in his own home for production work. Only a few months later on 4 August, RUNE put itself firmly on the map with a bold attempt at an Australian record. Nineteen-year-old student Nigel Wood extraordinarily broadcast non-stop for 87 hours going on-air every 15 minutes. Several years later in 1991, the station would take back its record with student Ian Ferguson smashing out a massive 192 hours of non-stop announcing.

TuneFM has operated on a 10-watt HPON Narrowcast license since it was awarded a frequency on the FM radio spectrum in 1986. Interference problems and frustration with the low-powered transmission system led the station to experiment, sometimes illegally, with alternative transmission methods. At times the station could be heard as far away as Uralla and Guyra. This limitation was appealed during the late 1990s and again in 2009. Both of these appeals were rejected by the ABA and ACMA respectively, even though the location of TuneFM's transmitter at the Newling Building in town restricts the station from being heard reliably on the main UNE campus.

Whilst being a Narrowcast station, TuneFM is a full member of the Community Broadcasting Association of Australia, and voluntarily subscribes to the Community Broadcasters' Code of Practice.

Until 2006, the station was funded by the UNE Students' Association (UNESA) through compulsory student union fees. Following the introduction of voluntary student unionism, the administration of the station was transferred to Services UNE Ltd in February 2006 prior to a Special General Meeting of the Students' Association that wound up that association. On 11 July 2006, the university announced a funding package for Services UNE Ltd and Sport UNE to ensure that a variety of non-academic services, including TuneFM, could be maintained on campus. In late 2008 the station was allocated over $600,000 from both the Federal Government and the University of New England in order to build new studios and facilities. These grants were awarded on the provision that TuneFM's new facilities could be utilised as a part of a proposed School of Rural Media and Communications at the University of New England.

Studio 1 in 2007

TuneFM became the focus of national attention during the 2010 Australian federal election, after TUNE's Operations Manager Kate Doak released audio from the station's archives of Opposition Leader Tony Abbott from 1979. The audio was recorded for the "Campuswide" current affairs program during a conference at the University of New England, which Mr. Abbott attended during his tenure as the President of the University of Sydney's Student Association. The story was picked up by the Sydney Morning Herald and remained in the Headlines section of their website for over three days during the election campaign, under the name of "The Tiny Tony Tapes".

At the commencement of 2014, the management of TuneFM was handed back over to the re-established UNESA.
