= Guy Debelle =

Australian economist

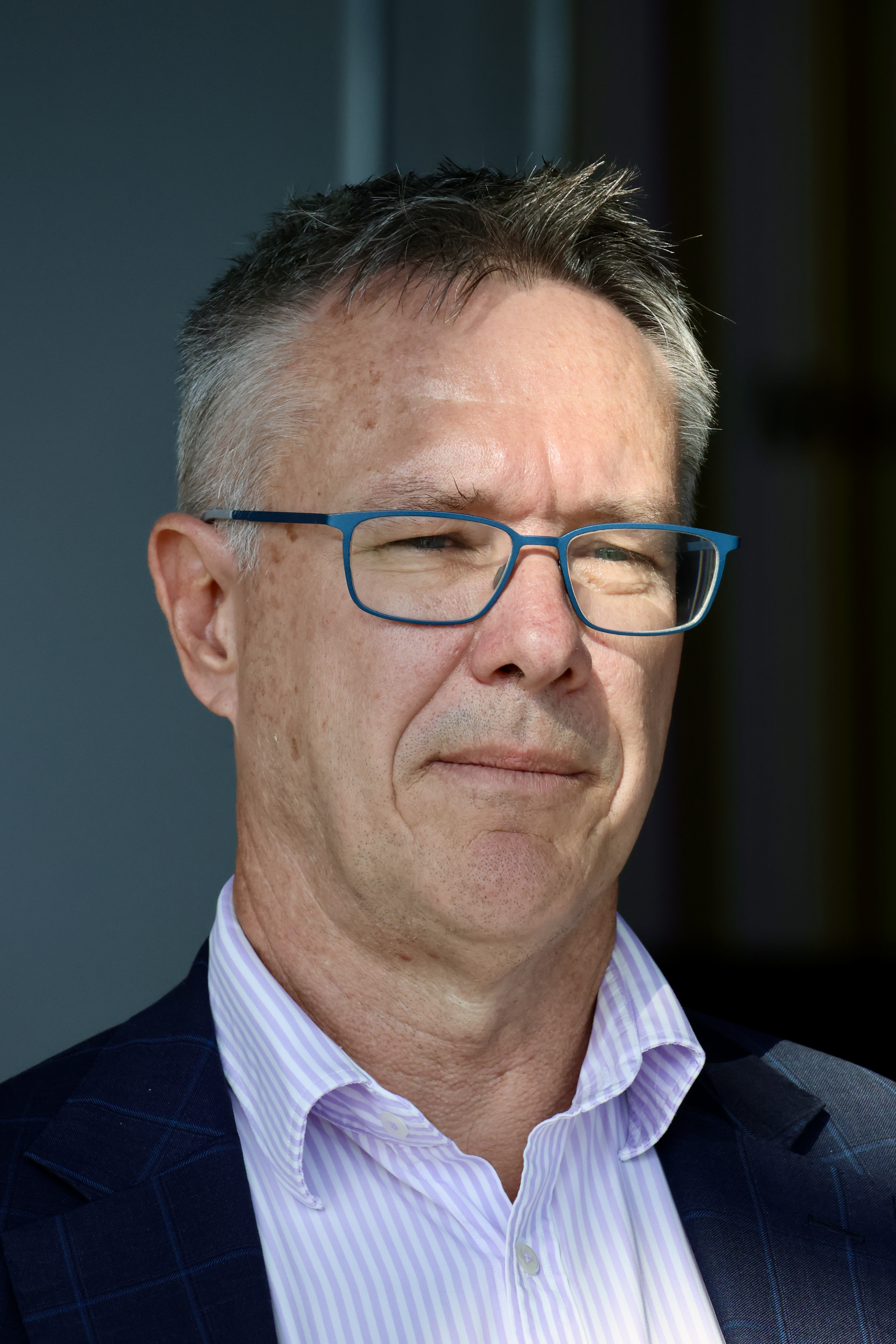
- Debelle in 2025
- Born: 1966/1967 (age 59–60)
- Education: St Peter's College; University of Adelaide (BEc); Massachusetts Institute of Technology (PhD)
- Occupation: Economist
- Guy Debelle's voice Debelle speaking about circular economy Recorded 9 May 2025

Guy Debelle (born 1966/1967) is an Australian economist who is the former Deputy Governor of the Reserve Bank of Australia, having been appointed in 2016. He sits on the board of Tivan, the ASX-listed mining company, as a non-executive director.

== Career ==
In 2022, after 7 years as a deputy governor and 25 years at the Reserve Bank of Australia, Debelle unexpectedly resigned from his post, pursuing a position at clean energy non-profit Fortescue Future Industries.

He was the short-lived Chief Financial Officer of Fortescue Future Industries, a global green energy company committed to producing zero-carbon green hydrogen from 100 per cent renewable sources. FFI aims to decarbonise hard-to-abate sectors and is responsible for the decarbonisation of its parent company – Fortescue – founded by Andrew Forrest. He resigned from Fortescue after only 17 months in the role, amidst a broader leadership crisis in the organisation.

Debelle also chairs the climate change working group at the Australian Council of Financial Regulators.

== Education ==
Debelle attended St Peter's College in Adelaide, South Australia and was the Dux of the school in 1983, his graduating year. Debelle graduated from the University of Adelaide with a Bachelor of Economics (hons) in 1987. He completed a PhD in economics at Massachusetts Institute of Technology supervised by Stanley Fischer. Debelle is also a Queen's Scout, awarded in 1983.

== Publications ==
- Debelle, Guy. & Stevens, Glenn. & Reserve Bank of Australia. Economic Research Department. (1995). Monetary policy goals for inflation in Australia. Sydney, NSW: Economic Research Dept., Reserve Bank of Australia.
