= Michele Bullock =

Australian economist (born 1962/1963)

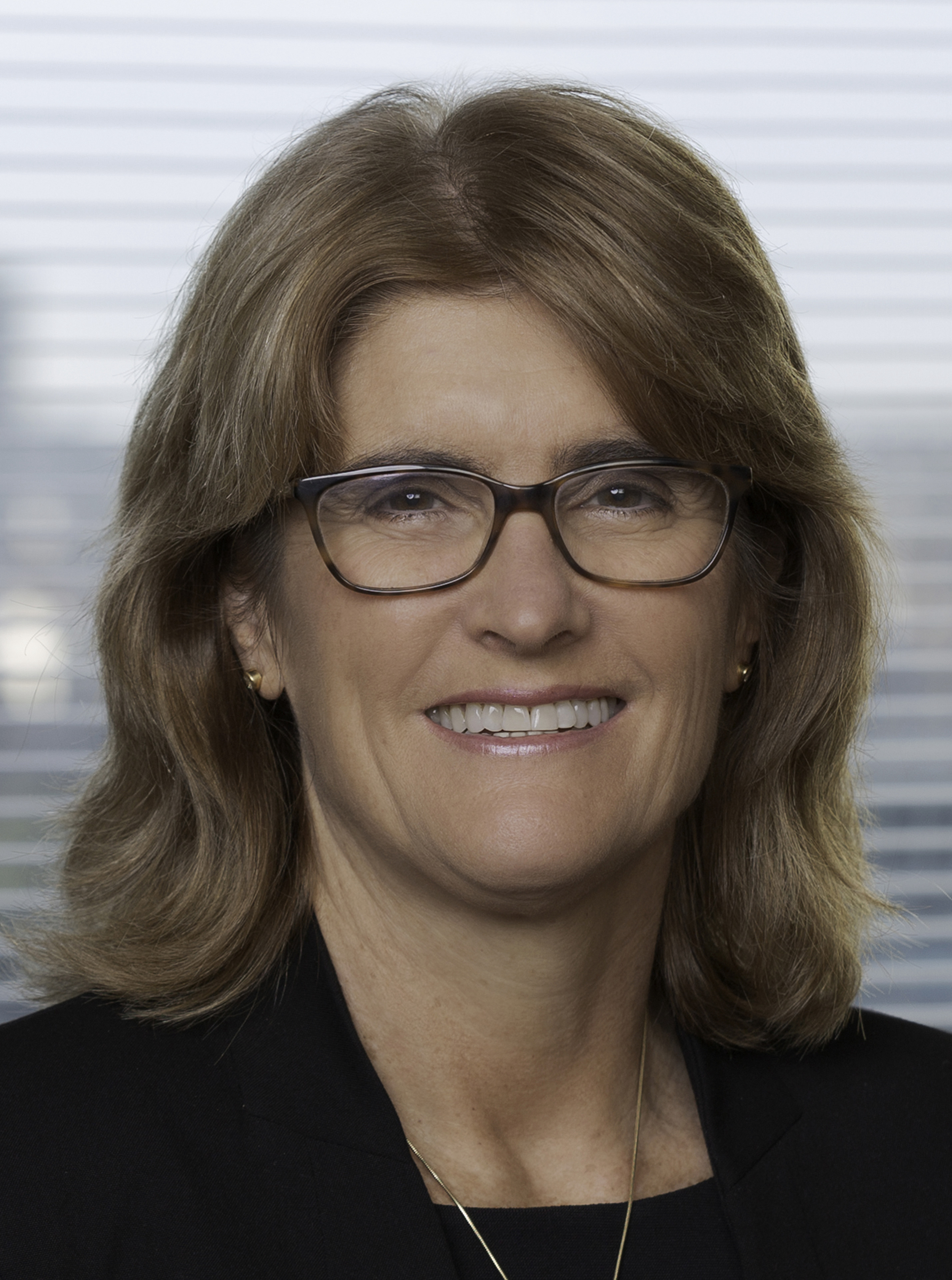

9th Governor of the Reserve Bank of Australia
- Incumbent
- Assumed office 18 September 2023
- Nominated by: Jim Chalmers
- Deputy: Andrew Hauser
- Preceded by: Philip Lowe

Deputy Governor of the Reserve Bank of Australia
- In office 2 April 2022 – 17 September 2023
- Governor: Philip Lowe
- Preceded by: Guy Debelle
- Succeeded by: Andrew Hauser

Personal details
- Born: 1962 or 1963 (age 63–64) Melbourne, Victoria, Australia
- Education: University of New South Wales (attended); University of New England (BEc); London School of Economics (MSc)

Michele Bullock (born 1962/1963) is an Australian economist who is currently governor of the Reserve Bank of Australia (RBA). She commenced as governor on 18 September 2023, and is the first woman to hold the role.

== Early life, personal life and education ==
Bullock was born in 1962 or 1963 in Melbourne. At approximately nine years of age, she moved to Armidale, New South Wales, where she attended Armidale High School.

After initially being accepted into medical study at the University of New South Wales, she switched to economics, graduating from the University of New England (UNE) with a Bachelor of Economics with honours in 1984. She has also studied at the London School of Economics, graduating with a Master of Science in 1989.

She has two children.

== Career ==
In her honours year at UNE, Bullock completed an internship at the RBA, following which she began employment at the bank. Since then, she has been continuously employed by the RBA, holding various roles. Notably, she was an assistant governor for three areas from 2010 to 2022, holding responsibility for currency from 2010 to 2015, business services from 2015 to 2016 and the financial system from 2016 to 2022, before being appointed deputy governor succeeding Guy Debelle in April 2022. She was the first woman to become deputy governor.

On 14 July 2023, she was announced as Philip Lowe's successor as governor of the RBA, commencing on 18 September that year. She is the ninth governor and the first woman to hold the position. She described it as "a challenging time to be coming into this role," and the Australian Financial Review particularly noted the difficulties presented by the implementation of the "wholesale reforms" recommended by a recently released public review of the RBA's operations. As part of the reforms, she faces the media significantly more often than her predecessors, holding at least eight press conferences a year in comparison to Lowe's total of four across his seven-year tenure. As governor, she chairs the RBA's Governance, Monetary Policy and Payments System boards and the Council of Financial Regulators.

Her appointment received a mixed public reception. Independent economist Nicki Hutley praised her as "an exceptional economist ... an excellent candidate and well qualified", while Centre for Independent Studies chief economist Peter Tulip raised concerns about her extensive RBA experience, suggesting that, "[i]f you want a big change in the RBA culture, the way the review panel recommends, then someone who's thrived under the old culture doesn't seem a natural choice to implement that agenda."

Government offices
Preceded by Philip Lowe	Governor of the Reserve Bank of Australia; 18 September 2023 – present	Incumbent
