= SiMERR =

SiMERR is an Australia-wide research body, primarily located at the University of New England in Armidale, Australia. They are best known for their program QuickSmart.

== History ==
SiMERR grew out of the Centre for Cognition Research in Learning and Teaching, established in 1996 at the University of New England. Branches, or hubs subsequently opening in partnership universities, such as the University of Tasmania and the Deakin University in Victoria. In 2005, they held a two-day National Summit.

SiMERR Australia's main goal is to improve learning outcomes for students in regional and rural areas, particularly in the areas of science, mathematics and Information and Communication Technology (ICT). They have launched several projects, most notably QuickSmart.

== QuickSmart ==
QuickSmart is a basic academic skills program aimed at middle years students in Australia, aimed at developing basic skills in literacy or numeracy. It was created by John Pegg and Lorraine Graham and was implemented in schools in 2001.

In May 2009, the NSW Department of Education and Training approved QuickSmart Numeracy as an intervention program for schools with literacy and numeracy needs in areas of low socioeconomic status. According to QuickSmart, by 2019 their programs had been implemented in over 1400 primary and high school around Australia.

According to the creators, QuickSmart lessons help develop the learners’ abilities to monitor their own learning and to set realistic goals for themselves, and results gathered have consistently demonstrated student growth of two to four years’ improvement over a 30-week period as measured by effect size statistics.
