= Bernie Fraser (economist) =

Australian economist

5th Governor of the Reserve Bank of Australia
- In office 18 September 1989 – 17 September 1996
- Preceded by: RA Johnston
- Succeeded by: Ian Macfarlane

Secretary of the Department of Treasury
- In office September 1984 – September 1989

Personal details
- Born: Bernard William Fraser; 26 February 1941 (age 85) Junee, New South Wales
- Education: University of New England (Australia); Australian National University
- Profession: Economist

Bernard William Fraser (born 26 February 1941) is an Australian economist and was the Governor of the Reserve Bank of Australia from September 1989 to September 1996.

Fraser was born in Junee, New South Wales in 1941. He joined the Commonwealth Public Service in 1961, starting at the Department of National Development. Educated at the University of New England and the Australian National University, Bernie Fraser joined the Commonwealth Public Service in 1961, spending time in Treasury, interspersed with postings in London as a Treasury representative, three years in the Department of Finance and three years as Director of the National Energy Office. He soon moved to the Department of Treasury, in 1963. He was its London representative from 1969 to 1972. In 1981 Fraser was appointed Director of the National Energy Office. He returned to the Treasury in 1984 and became Secretary from September 1984 to September 1989.

Fraser is an independent director of several industry superannuation funds and is a director of Members Equity Bank. He is the chairman of the board of the Climate Change Authority.

He has appeared in several television ads in Australia for superannuation funds, notably sporting the catchphrase; "it's the super of the future".

He was educated at Junee High School, the University of New England, Australia and the Australian National University. He has received Honorary Doctorates from the University of New England, Australia and Charles Sturt University, Australia. He is also an honorary Professor of Economics at the University of Canberra.

Government offices
Preceded by John Stone	Secretary of the Department of the Treasury; 1984–1989	Succeeded by Chris Higgins
Preceded by RA Johnston	Governor of the Reserve Bank of Australia; 1989–1996	Succeeded by Ian Macfarlane
