= J. G. Phillips =

Australian economist

Sir John Phillips KBE

2nd Governor of the Reserve Bank of Australia
- In office July 1968 – July 1975
- Preceded by: H. C. Coombs
- Succeeded by: H. M. Knight

Personal details
- Born: 13 March 1911 Mosman, New South Wales
- Died: 7 October 1986 (aged 75) Manly, New South Wales
- Profession: Economist

Sir John Grant Phillips KBE (13 March 1911 – 7 October 1986) was an Australian economist who became the second Governor of the Reserve Bank of Australia, from 1968 to 1975. His name appeared on Australian currency notes as "J. G. Phillips".

== Honours ==
In the Queen's Birthday Honours of 8 June 1968, he was appointed Commander of the Order of the British Empire (CBE), and in the 1972 New Year Honours he was promoted Knight Commander in that order (KBE).

== Death ==
In October 1986 his and his wife's bodies were found after their joint suicide. The couple had been a member of a local euthanasia society, and although in good health, had prepared for their joint suicide.

== Publications ==
- Developments in monetary theory and policies (1971), R. C. Mills memorial lecture; 5 – ISBN 0-424-06260-7

Government offices
| Preceded by H. C. Coombs | Governor of the Reserve Bank of Australia; 1968–1975 | Succeeded by HM Knight |
