= University of New England Students' Association =

- Institution: University of New England (Australia)
- Location: UNESA, University of New England (Australia), Armidale NSW 2351
- Established: 1940
- Members: c. 22,000 constituents

The University of New England Students' Association (UNESA) was the representative body for students at the University of New England, Australia. It has existed in myriad forms over many decades. The vision statement of its most recent incorporation expressed a vision to: “Represent without fear or favour the students of the University of New England. To encourage participation in a fair and just tertiary experience through shared higher thinking.”

The latest iteration of student governance is the UNE Student Council.

== Historical Operations ==
Under UNESA, TUNE! FM was initially established in April 1970. Then known as Radio UNE, it was the first student radio station in Australia. Further established under UNESA was the student newspaper, Nucleus (established April 1947). It also entirely funded a Dentist paid for by the 'dental levy' - the first dental service at a university in Australia. Also funded were a second hand bookshop and many affiliated clubs and societies. These services (except dentistry) still exist at the university, whether under UNESA or other bodies. Following UNESA's dissolution in 2006, these services were largely delivered by ServicesUNE Ltd.

In 2015, management of Clubs and Societies, Tune!FM, Uni4me (Independent Student Advocates), and the 2nd Hand Bookstore were transferred from UNESA to UNE Life by order of the University of New England's CFO Prof. Peter Creamer. UNESA was until 2018 involved with the following operations:

- The Legacy Scholarship Fund
- Nucleus - student news paper
- Professional Experience Name Badges
- Advocacy to federal student bodies
- Advocacy to federal and state parliaments

== Divisions and Reformations ==
Prior to 1990, the association was known as the UNE Students' Representative Council and, for a time, as the Armidale Students' Association. From 1980 to 2006 post-graduate students at the University were represented by the University of New England Postgraduate Association (UNEPA). Following the introduction of voluntary student unionism, UNESA was dissolved at a special general meeting of the members in late March 2006, and UNEPA was dissolved shortly after. The functions and services previously provided by UNESA and UNEPA were taken over by Services UNE Ltd and split into two different organisations (for undergraduates and post-graduates respectively): Undergrads@UNE and Postgrads@UNE. Undergrads@UNE was replaced in 2009 by 'UNEG Ltd' (UNE Guild). Postgrads@UNE remained separate under the same name until 2013, when both groups reunited with the re-establishment of the University of New England Students Association. In 2018, UNESA was disbanded again following an adverse ruling by Fair Trading NSW.

Thereafter, the UNELife Student Advisory Committee was established and disbanded and then Student Consultative Committee was established and disbanded. In 2023, the UNE Student Council was established.

== UNE Liberal Club ==
In February 2005, University of New England Liberal Club (UNELC) (Liberal Party of Australia) members won control of the Students' Association. UNELC members also controlled the student union and the University Council undergraduate position.

UNESA split from the National Union of Students in a disaffiliation referendum. UNESA was among the few student organisations in Australia to support voluntary student unionism.

In September 2005 UNESA made world news following the appointment of a Heterosexual Officer. This position and the position of Men's Officer were created at the same time as the position of Homosexual Officer was disbanded along with the campus "queer space".

In March 2006, under the control of UNELC, UNESA was dissolved.

== Past Presidents of UNESA ==
- 1940-1942 Dr. J. Belshaw
- 1942-1944 N.O'Grady
- 1944-1945 T.Swanson
- 1945-1946 F. Chong
- 1946-1951 E. Tapp
- 1951-1952 N. Fletcher/ C. Wickham
- 1952-1953 W. Furniss
- 1953-1954 E. Watson
- 1954-1955 G. Harvey/ E. Boeham
- 1955-1956 D. Lamberton
- 1956-1957 M. Kelley
- 1958-1974 - Records unclear
- 1975 Laurie Hagan
- 1976 Celia Smith
- 1978 Karen Harris
- 1979 Gavin Roberts
- 1980 Stephanie Williams (Lawson)
- 1981 Kirsty Arnold / David Cook
- 1982-1983 Eva Cawthorne
- 1984 Christopher Morley
- 1985 Andrew Quirk
- 1986-1987 Angela Jackson
- 1987 Jack Tynan
- 1987-1988 Peter Legg (interim)
- 1988 Paschal Leahy
- 1989 Paul Mc Dermott
- 1990 Steven Blaney
- 1991 Steven Blaney
- 1992 Steven Blaney
- 1993 Lawrence James (Louis Armand)
- 1994-1995 Adam Mara
- 1996-1997 Tanya Gadiel (née Barber)
- 1998 Siobhan Barry
- 1999 James Stevens
- 2000-2001 - Tom Fisher
- 2001-2002 - Kahn Quinlan
- 2003 - Kryssy Loker
- 2004 - Phil Schubert
- 2005 - Samantha Aber
- 2006 - Tim Fisher
- 2006 - Amos Young
- 2006-2007 - Les Wells (Interim)
- 2007 - Andrew Zhen
- 2007-2008 - Benjamin Graham
- 2009-2010 - Emily Hill
- 2010-2012 - Sonia-Lee Donohue
- 2013-2015 - David Mailler
- 2015-2016 - Judd Newton
- 2016-2017 - Dale Finch
- 2017-2018 - Koady Williams
- 2022 - Emma Wellham
- 2023 - 2024 Evie Levens
- 2025 - Kristy Sillman
