= Ian Macfarlane (economist) =

Australian economist (born 1946)

Ian Macfarlane AC
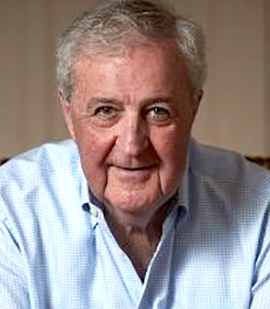

6th Governor of the Reserve Bank of Australia
- In office 18 September 1996 – 17 September 2006
- Nominated by: Peter Costello
- Deputy: Graeme Thompson; Stephen Grenville; Glenn Stevens
- Preceded by: Bernie Fraser
- Succeeded by: Glenn Stevens

Personal details
- Born: 22 June 1946 (age 80) Sydney, Australia
- Education: B.Ec. (Hons), M.Ec., Monash University; D.Sc.Ec. (Honoris Causa), University of Sydney, D.Litt. (Honoris Causa), Maquarie University; D.Com. (Honoris Causa), University of Melbourne, LL.D (Honoris Causa), Monash University; D.Sc. (Honoris Causa), University of New South Wales
- Profession: Economist

Ian John Macfarlane AC (born 22 June 1946) is an Australian economist, and central banker. After an early career as an economist in Melbourne, Sydney, Oxford and Paris, he joined the Reserve Bank of Australia in 1979 and rose to become Governor from 1996 to 2006. After retiring from the Reserve Bank, he became a company director, economic consultant and author of two books.

== Education and early career ==
Macfarlane moved to Melbourne at the age of three and lived there until he was twenty three. He was educated at Melbourne High School and Monash University, Melbourne, from which he received the Bachelor of Economics degree with honours in 1968, and the Master of Economics degree in 1971. While completing his master's degree he taught at Monash University. He moved to Sydney in 1970 on a short-term contract with the Reserve Bank of Australia to join a team building the first econometric model of the Australian economy. When his contract finished, he moved to England and from 1971–72 he worked at the Institute of Economics and Statistics at the University of Oxford. Following this, he then moved to the Organisation for Economic Co-operation and Development (OECD) in Paris, where he served until 1978.

== Reserve Bank of Australia ==
Macfarlane returned to Australia and became a permanent employee of the Reserve Bank's Research Department in 1979. In 1981 he was made its deputy manager. In 1983, six months before the float of the Australian dollar, he moved to the Financial Markets Department where his work involved close interaction with the money, bond and foreign exchange markets. In 1988 he returned to head the Economics Department to a position now known as Assistant Governor (Economic).

In 1992 he was appointed Deputy Governor by the Keating government, and in 1996, he was appointed Governor by the Howard government. On taking up the position, he signed a memorandum of Agreement with Treasurer Peter Costello which introduced Australia's inflation-targeting monetary policy regime. The ten years during which Macfarlane was Governor was a period of good economic growth and low inflation, although the Asian financial crisis in 1997, the global recession of 2001 and an incipient housing price bubble in 2003 presented challenges. On Macfarlane's retirement in 2006, Treasurer Peter Costello, said: "Ian Macfarlane has been an exceptionally successful governor of the Reserve Bank ... and when history of the last ten years is written, it will show as one of, if not the greatest periods of economic management in Australian history." Prime Minister John Howard wrote in his autobiography "Macfarlane was the stand-out economic official in the lifetime of my government. His advice and sense of balance was far superior to that of anybody else who provided economic advice to us".

== Post-Reserve Bank career ==
After retiring from the RBA Macfarlane was appointed a director of three public companies — Woolworths (January 2007 – March 2015), Leighton Holdings (1 June 2007 – 22 March 2013) and ANZ Bank (16 February 2007 – 16 December 2016). In May 2014, Macfarlane was a member of the international advisory boards of Goldman Sachs and the China Banking Regulatory Commission. He was also a director of the Lowy Institute for International Policy.

Immediately after leaving the RBA, he was chosen to deliver the Boyer Lectures for 2006. This series of six lectures, which combines both history and economics, was published as a book titled The Search for Stability.

Macfarlane has always been interested in history, and in 2019 published a purely historical work titled Ten Remarkable Australians: they made their mark on the world but were forgotten. This is a series of biographical essays on ten Australians born before Federation who achieved international prominence in the first half of the 1900s.

== Awards and honours ==
Elected a Fellow of the Academy of Social Sciences of Australia	1998
Received Centenary Medal from the Australian Government	2001
Chosen Central Bank Governor of the year by Eurocurrency magazine	2002
Made Companion of the Order of Australia (AC)	2004
Awarded honorary Doctor of Science in Economics, University of Sydney	2004
Awarded honorary Doctor of Letters, Macquarie University	2005
Awarded honorary Doctor of Commerce, University of Melbourne	2006
Awarded honorary Doctor of Laws, Monash University	2007
Awarded honorary Doctor of Science, University of New South Wales	2008

== Personal ==
Macfarlane married Barbara Heather Payne in 1970. They have two children, a son Duncan and daughter Victoria and six grandchildren, Andrew, Abby, Oscar, Alice, James and Olivia.

Government offices
Preceded by Bernie Fraser	Governor of the Reserve Bank of Australia; 1996 - 2006	Succeeded by Glenn Stevens
