= H. M. Knight =

Australian economist (1919–2015)

Sir Harold Knight KBE DSC

3rd Governor of the Reserve Bank of Australia
- In office July 1975 – August 1982
- Preceded by: J. G. Phillips
- Succeeded by: R. A. Johnston

Personal details
- Born: Harold Murray Knight; 13 August 1919 Melbourne, Victoria, Australia
- Died: 19 June 2015 (aged 95) Sydney, New South Wales, Australia
- Spouse: Gwenyth Catherine Knight
- Education: University of Melbourne
- Profession: Economist

Military service
- Allegiance: Australia
- Branch/service: Australian Army (1940–43); Royal Australian Naval Volunteer Reserve (1943–46)
- Years of service: 1940–1946
- Rank: Lieutenant
- Unit: Royal Australian Engineers; HMAS Polaris; HMAS Lonsdale
- Awards: Distinguished Service Cross

Sir Harold Murray Knight KBE DSC (13 August 1919 – 19 June 2015) was an Australian economist. He was the third Governor of the Reserve Bank of Australia, serving from 1975 to 1982.

He was educated at Scotch College, Melbourne (1933–1935) and Melbourne University where he was resident at Trinity College. He graduated with a Master of Commerce degree.

During World War II, Knight enlisted in the Australian Army on 1 July 1940. In 1943, he transferred to the Royal Australian Naval Volunteer Reserve, where he served on the survey ship HMAS Polaris and was awarded the Distinguished Service Cross for distinguished service in successful survey work under dangerous conditions in the Far East.

He was appointed a Knight Commander of the Order of the British Empire (KBE) in the New Year's Day Honours of 1980.

He was the grandfather of novelist Dominic Knight, and of artist Jasper Knight, whose portrait of him was shortlisted for the Archibald Prize in 2006.

Government offices
Preceded by J. G. Phillips	Governor of the Reserve Bank of Australia; 1975–1982	Succeeded by R. A. Johnston
