= Glenn Stevens =

Australian economist

Glenn Robert Stevens AC
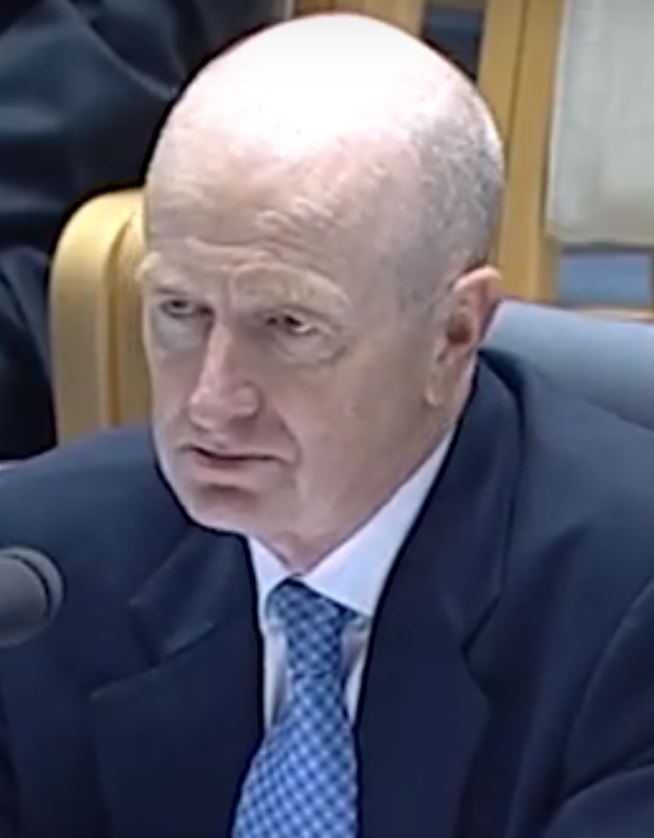

7th Governor of the Reserve Bank of Australia
- Retired
- In office 18 September 2006 – 17 September 2016
- Nominated by: Peter Costello
- Deputy: Ric Battellino; Philip Lowe
- Preceded by: Ian Macfarlane
- Succeeded by: Philip Lowe

Personal details
- Born: 23 January 1958 (age 68) Sydney, New South Wales
- Spouse: Susan
- Children: 2
- Education: University of Sydney; University of Western Ontario
- Profession: Economist
- Awards: Companion of the Order of Australia

Glenn Robert Stevens AC (born 23 January 1958) is an Australian economist who was the Governor of the Reserve Bank of Australia from 2006 to 2016.

== Early life and education ==
Stevens was born in Sydney in 1958.

He graduated from the University of Sydney in 1979 with a Bachelor of Economics, first class honours. He subsequently graduated from the University of Western Ontario with a Master of Arts. In 2014 he was awarded honoris causa a Doctorate of Laws from the University of Western Ontario. In 2016 the University of Sydney awarded him a Doctor of Science in Economics (honoris causa).

== Career ==
After holding various positions in the Bank prior to 1990, he accepted a position as Visiting Scholar at the Federal Reserve Bank of San Francisco. Subsequently, Stevens held positions in the Reserve Bank of Australia, as Head of the Economic Analysis Department, the Head of the International Department, and was Assistant Governor (Economic) from 1996 to 2001, prior to his appointment as Deputy Governor in December 2001.

=== Reserve Bank of Australia Governor ===
Following the September 2006 retirement of Ian Macfarlane, who served as Governor for ten years, Stevens was appointed to replace Macfarlane. Stevens has demonstrated a commitment to the style of operation of the Reserve established under Macfarlane including its independence from the direct influence of government, the 2–3% inflation target over the course of the economic cycle, and the accountability of the Reserve when the decision is made to change interest rates.

Early in 2008 Stevens announced an official interest rate rise by 50 basis points, predicting ongoing inflation pressures. This drew strong criticism from The Daily Telegraph. As the 2008 financial crisis progressed, Stevens announced large cuts to the official rate. By the end of 2008, the Reserve Bank board, chaired by Stevens, had cut interest rates a total of 300 basis points, returning them to mid-2002 levels. By August 2013, interest rates had been cut to 2.5%, with the RBA monthly meeting minutes citing domestic economic growth below long-term trends, the relatively high value of the Australian dollar, and the "subdued" labour market as the justification for the historically low official interest rates. In May 2016 the RBA lowered the cash rate to 1.75%. The RBA stated that inflation has been unexpectedly low, due to low growth in labour costs and very low cost pressures elsewhere in the world; which justified lowering the cash rate to historically low levels.

=== Macquarie Bank Chair of the Board ===
In December 2021, it was announced that Stevens would be appointed the Chair of both the Macquarie Group Limited and Macquarie Bank.

== Personal life ==
Stevens is a professing Christian, and plays the guitar at his local Baptist Church. Stevens once said: "if you're a Christian, God has given you certain capabilities to do a job, to earn a living. The Bible teaches that you should do that as if you were doing that for Him, because you are, and that's my attitude."

He has spent most of his life living in the Sutherland Shire and lives in Sylvania Waters. He is also a recreational pilot with Commercial Pilot Licence (CPL) and Command Instrument Rating (CIR). He owns a Beechcraft Baron G58. Glenn flies for charity organisation Angel Flight.

In 2016 Stevens was appointed Companion of the Order of Australia for eminent service to the financial and central bank sectors through leadership roles, to the implementation of innovative monetary and economic policy, to international financial regulation, and to the community.

Government offices
Preceded by Ian Macfarlane	Governor of the Reserve Bank of Australia; 2006–2016	Succeeded by Philip Lowe
