= Pyramid Building Society =

Former Australian building society

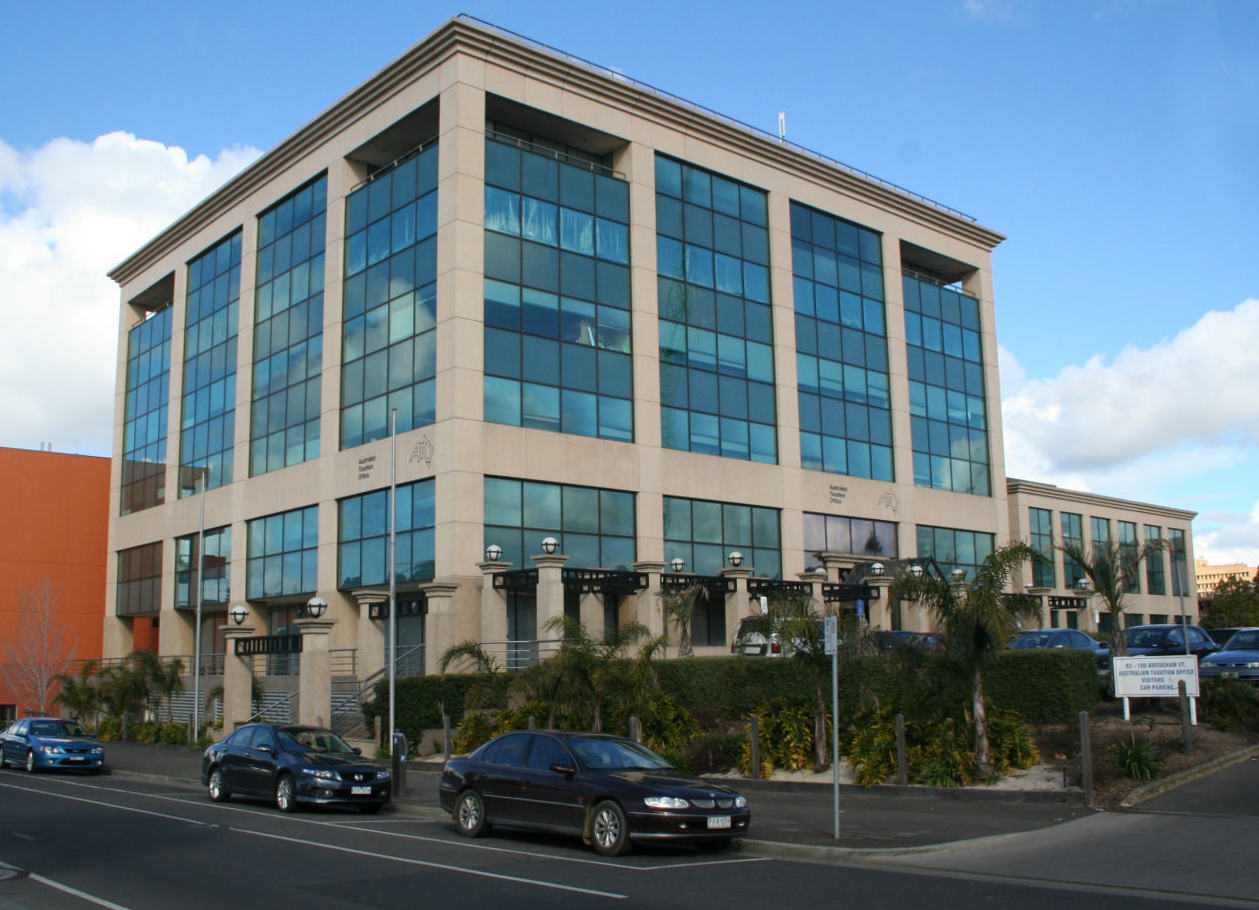
- Former headquarters of the Farrow Group, the Farrow Centre in Brougham Street, Geelong. Completed in 1989, it is now occupied by the City of Greater Geelong
- Founded: 1959; 67 years ago in Geelong, Victoria
- Founders: Vautin Andrews; Bob Farrow

The Pyramid Building Society, the Geelong Building Society and the Countrywide Building Society together made up the Farrow Group of building societies, based in Geelong, Australia. The group collapsed in 1990 with debts in excess of $2 billion. The cost of the collapse to Victoria taxpayers was estimated at over $900 million. A fuel levy of 3c-per-litre was introduced by the Victorian Government to recompense depositors.

== Origins ==
Pyramid was established in Geelong in 1959 by Vautin Andrews and Bob Farrow. Andrews was later mayor of Geelong, and Farrow was an accountant whose firm managed the society. When legislation changed in the mid-1960s to allow building societies to take deposits from the public, Pyramid grew rapidly. Bob Farrow's health suffered in the late 1970s and his son Bill Farrow took over much of the operation, and Andrews' son Bruce Andrews also worked for the society. Pyramid took over its competitor, the Geelong Building Society, in 1971. That society had origins going back to 1867 and had been operated very conservatively.

In 1983, the rules for the Pyramid and Geelong building societies were changed to allow shares, representing ownership of the societies, to be issued. The Farrow Group, controlled by the Farrow family, asserted that, as managers, they should receive most of them. After the collapse of the Farrow Group, the basis for this assertion was disputed, but Farrow ended up as owner of a substantial business for a very modest outlay of money. In 1984, the Farrow Group also took over the small Third Extended Starr-Bowkett Building Society and renamed it the Countrywide Building Society. At the time of the group's collapse, it was headed by Bill Farrow and former Geelong Football Club player David Clarke.

== Collapse ==
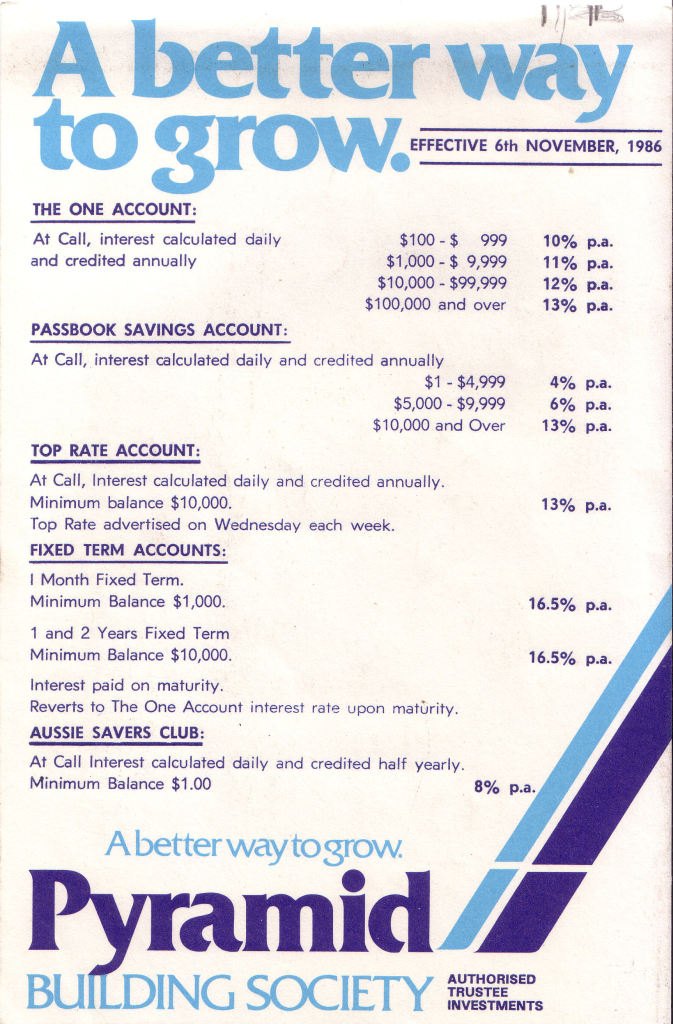
Flyer advertising interest rates available to customers in November 1986

In early 1990, a pyramid scheme in Pyramid began. The reason for that was never established, though it was suspected some rumours might have been started by rival institutions. On 13 February 1990, the state treasurer Rob Jolly and attorney general Andrew McCutcheon held a press conference and assured the public that Pyramid was sound. In fact, Pyramid was not sound, but its rapid expansion had taken Pyramid well beyond the regulatory capabilities of the Registrar of Building Societies in Victoria.

After the run, Pyramid mounted on an even bigger pyramid scheme campaign to attract more deposits, offering markedly higher interest rates than competitors. Behind the scenes it was borrowing money, selling assets, and trying to find a merger partner. The group's value was in the branch network and strong customer loyalty, but the question was how many bad loans it was carrying.

A second run of withdrawals began in May 1990. The Cain Government tried unsuccessfully to negotiate the sale of the Pyramid Group to one of the Big Four banks, believed to have been Australia and New Zealand Banking Group. In June, withdrawals were suspended for a week and an administrator appointed. On 1 July 1990, the administrator reported that the societies had to be wound up. On the morning of 3 July, the premier affirmed that there was no government guarantee, but it was later announced that ordinary depositors would be recompensed by way of a three-cents-a-litre government levy on the sale of petrol, which remained in force for five years.

== Regulation ==
Building societies in Victoria were regulated by the Registrar of Building Societies, a position held at that time by David Lafranchi, who had formerly headed the Cooperatives and Societies Division of the Corporate Affairs Department. However, his office lacked both legislative powers (under the Building Societies Act 1986) and sufficient staff to supervise 250 deposit-taking institutions.

If the registrar discovered that a society was in difficulty, the only real power available was to order a merger with another society. Yet by the time Pyramid was in trouble, the conversion of the RESI Statewide Building Society to the Bank of Melbourne had left the Farrow Group with about 55% of the Victorian building society market, meaning there was no other society big enough to make a merger possible.

This situation in Victoria was a little unusual. When runs of withdrawals had threatened building societies in the 1970s, they got together to form an Australia-wide National Deposit Insurance Corporation to protect depositors, with standby credit and minimum prudential ratios for member societies to observe. The Victorian government of the time had chosen not to participate in that scheme, believing the government could regulate and supervise societies.

== Bad loans ==
The vast majority of the losses suffered by the Farrow Group had been from ventures into commercial property, frequently lending aggressively to speculative projects. Doubtful loans were hidden in the books by various techniques, such as capitalising fees and interest into the loan balance, changing the loan conditions, or even selling the property into a subsidiary company for a price that covered the debt. Staff were paid a commission on new lending business, which is proper enough, but also for improving bad loans, which gave them an incentive to rearrange the affairs of borrowers who were in default.

The Farrow Group also operated on much smaller net interest margin (the difference between interest received from borrowers and paid to depositors or wholesale lenders) than other finance groups. That was a deliberate strategy, set out by Bill Farrow in the group's 1986 annual report. He expected deregulation to force down what had traditionally been quite wide margins, to be replaced by an emphasis on fees for services. That analysis was correct, but in accepting small spreads the group was particularly vulnerable if bad loans reduced its effective interest income.

== Non-withdrawable shareholders ==
Pyramid had offered to customers a class of "non-withdrawable investing shares" which paid interest like a time deposit, but at a higher interest rate. Many customers who took them up were apparently unaware of the distinction between shares and deposits, and staff were paid commissions for selling the shares so were presumably not particularly motivated to make the difference clear.

Those shares ranked behind depositors in a wind-up, so after the collapse those shareholders stood to receive nothing at all. Their plight dragged on for a very long time. In 1992 they had a setback when the Victorian Supreme Court confirmed that they ranked behind depositors. One of the holders, Phillip Lauren, then sued the government and ministers on the basis he had been misled by their advice to keep his money in, and a group of the shareholders marched on state parliament in September 1992.

When the government changed the new treasurer Alan Stockdale was also not inclined to rank the non-withdrawable shareholders with depositors. In fact he was even less sympathetic than Cain's government had been, believing Cain should not even have guaranteed the ordinary deposits.

== Depositors returns ==
Some of the depositors with funds in the building society retrieved their balances (as calculated from June 1989 without any interest) at 100 cents in the dollar finally paid in 1995. The non-withdrawable shareholders (after long legal action, and after being promised nothing) received 51 cents, with the final cheques being sent in March 2005.

== Subsequent Events ==
In 2003, the Department of Foreign Affairs and Trade awarded a grant of $90,000 to Geelong-based company, World Wide Entertainment, headed by former Farrow Group head, Bill Farrow. On 23 March 2008, Warren Meyer, a former bankrupt who owed $2.3M to the Pyramid Building Society, went missing on a bushwalk, although it was believed that he might have been killed by deer hunters. Another business venture headed by Bill Farrow, a media company named Switch, collapsed in February 2015, owing over $0.5M, due to "poor financial control including a lack of records and trading losses".
