= Reserve Bank of Australia =

Central bank of Australia

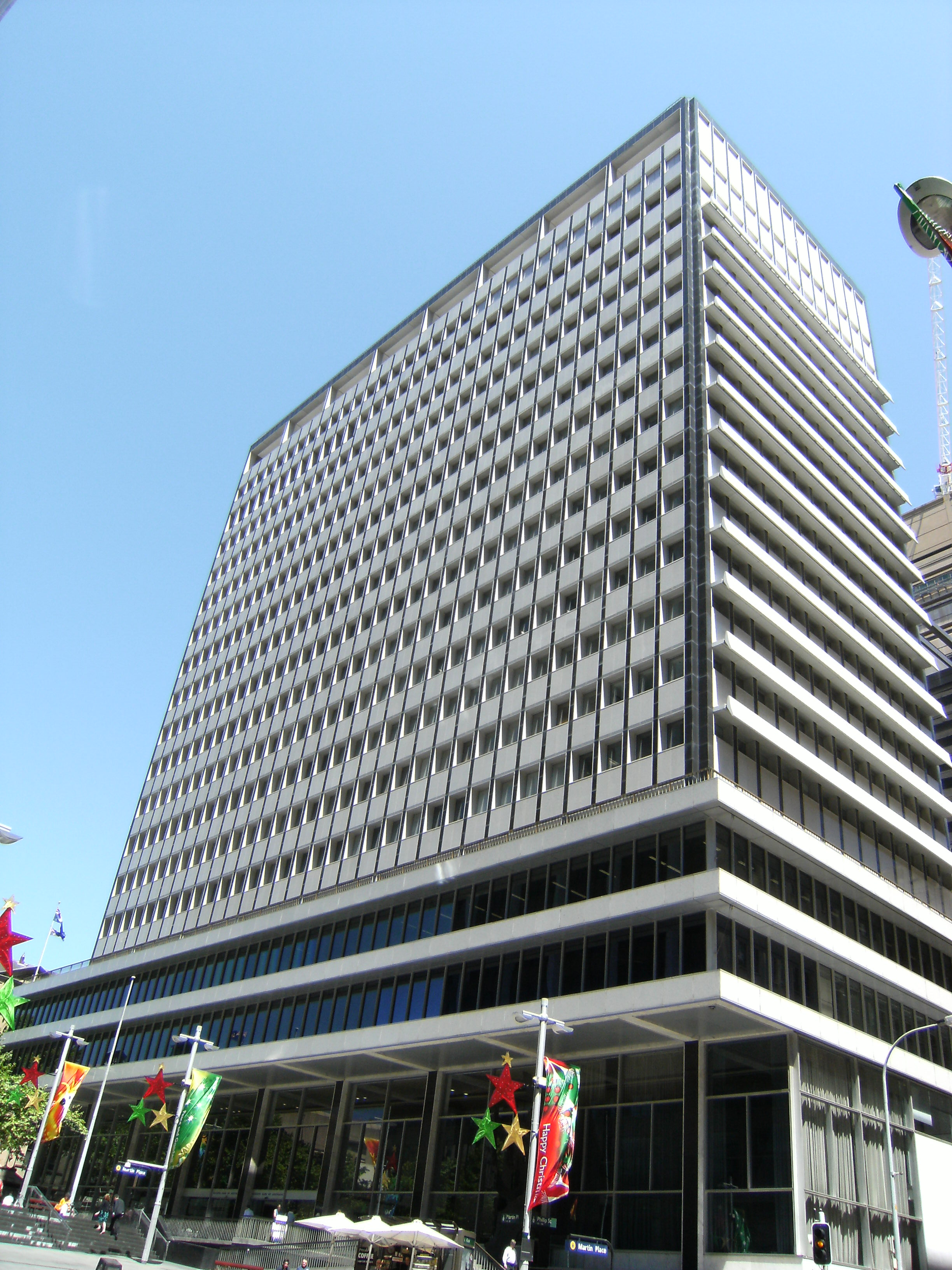
- Reserve Bank of Australia Building, Sydney
- Central bank of: Australia
- Headquarters: Reserve Bank of Australia Building, Sydney
- Coordinates: 33.8681°S 151.2117°E
- Established: 14 January 1960
- Ownership: 100% state ownership by the Australian Government
- Governor: Michele Bullock
- Currency: Australian dollar AUD (ISO 4217)
- Reserves: $102,520 million (AUD)
- Reserve requirements: None
- Interest rate target: 4.85%
- Website: www.rba.gov.au

The Reserve Bank of Australia (RBA) is Australia's central bank and banknote issuing authority. It has had this role since 14 January 1960, when the Reserve Bank Act 1959 removed the central banking functions from the Commonwealth Bank.

The Bank's duty is to contribute to the stability of the currency, full employment, and the economic prosperity and welfare of the Australian people. It does this by conducting monetary policy to meet agreed inflation and full employment objectives, working to maintain a strong financial system and efficient payments system, and issuing the nation's banknotes.

The RBA also provides services to the Government of Australia and services to other central banks and official institutions. The RBA currently comprises the Payments System Board, which sets the payment system policy of the bank, and the Reserve Bank Board, which sets all other monetary and banking policies of the bank.

Both boards consist of members of the bank, the Treasury, other Australian government agencies, and leaders of other institutions that are part of the Australian economy. The structure of the Reserve Bank Board has remained consistent ever since 1951, with the exception of the change in the number of members of the board. The governor of the Reserve Bank of Australia is appointed by the Treasurer and chairs both the Payment Systems and Reserve Bank Boards and when there are disagreements between both boards, the governor resolves them.

== Roles and responsibilities ==
The Reserve Bank is currently governed by the Reserve Bank Act 1959.

In practice the Reserve Bank concentrates on the first objective, that is to control inflation through monetary policy. The current objective is a policy of inflation targeting aimed at maintaining the annual inflation rate at between "2–3 per cent, on average, over the cycle". This target was first set in 1993 by the then Reserve Bank Governor Bernie Fraser and was then formalised in 1996 by the then-Treasurer Peter Costello and incoming governor Ian McFarlane.

The Reserve Bank gives banking and registry services to agencies of the government, to other central banks, and other official institutions. The Reserve Bank manages Australia's gold and foreign exchange reserves.

Nearly 94% of the RBA's employees work at its headquarters and at the Business Resumption Site, both in Sydney. The remainder of the total of 926 staff work in Adelaide, Brisbane, Canberra, Melbourne, Perth, London and New York City. A wholly owned subsidiary of the bank is Note Printing Australia, which employs 257 other workers, and which manufactures the Australian dollar and other securities, for markets both in and outside of Australia.

The Payments System Board fills the role of deciding on the bank's payments system policy and the Reserve Bank Board is responsible for all other monetary and banking policies of the bank. Conflicts between the two boards do not occur often, and when they do, they are resolved by the governor.

== Governors and their roles ==
The Governor is the most senior official of the RBA. The position is appointed by the Treasurer for a term of up to seven years and may be renewed. The Governor chairs both the Reserve Bank Board and the Payments System Board and resolves any disputes between them.

The governor of the Commonwealth Bank of Australia was both an ex officio member of the Notes Board from 1920 to 1924 and of the eight directors of the Commonwealth Bank from 1924 to 1945. The Commonwealth Bank and Bank Acts in 1945 stated the governor's responsibilities of managing the CBA. In 1951, legislation established a 10-member board of which the CBA governor was a member. The CBA has maintained a similar structure since 1951.

The RBA governor is required by the Reserve Bank Act 1959 to keep in contact with the Treasury on matters concerning both the Treasury and Reserve Bank and vice versa. It also mandates that the RBA board inform the government of the bank's monetary and banking policy, which is often accomplished through the governor's meetings with the Treasurer. Since 1996, the governor and other senior members of the RBA have appeared twice annually before the House of Representatives Standing Committee on Economics to explain the conduct of the bank.

=== List of Governors ===
*	Died in office

#	Governor	Post-nominals	Start	End	Ref
Governors of the Commonwealth Bank of Australia
1	Denison Miller	KCMG	June 1912	June 1923	
2	James Kell		October 1924	October 1926	
3	Sir Ernest Riddle		October 1926	February 1938	
4	Sir Henry Sheehan	CBE	February 1938	March 1941	
5	Hugh Armitage	CMG	July 1941	December 1948	
6	H. C. Coombs		January 1949	January 1960	
Governors of the Reserve Bank of Australia
1	H. C. Coombs		January 1960	July 1968	
2	Sir J. G. Phillips	KBE	July 1968	July 1975	
3	Sir H. M. Knight	KBE, DSC	July 1975	August 1982	
4	Bob Johnston	AC	August 1982	July 1989	
5	Bernie Fraser		September 1989	September 1996	
6	Ian Macfarlane	AC	September 1996	September 2006	
7	Glenn Stevens	AC	18 September 2006	17 September 2016	
8	Philip Lowe		18 September 2016	17 September 2023	
9	Michele Bullock		18 September 2023	–	

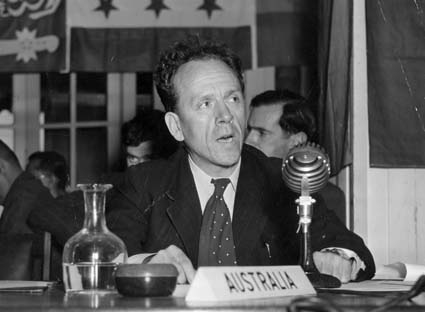
H. C. Coombs was the only governor to have headed both the Commonwealth Bank and the Reserve Bank of Australia.

The longest-serving governor, if his periods of service to both the Commonwealth Bank and the Reserve Bank of Australia are included, is H. C. Coombs, who served nineteen years and six months combined. He is regarded by some as one of the most committed anti-inflationists in government throughout the 1950s and 1960s. The longest-serving Commonwealth Bank governor is Sir Ernest Riddle, who served eleven years and four months, while the longest-serving Reserve Bank governor is Ian Macfarlane, who served ten years. The shortest-serving governor by many years is James Kell, who served two years for the Commonwealth Bank.

In July 2023, the RBA, along with the Treasurer, Jim Chalmers, announced the appointment of Michele Bullock as its new Governor, taking up the role in September 2023. This made Bullock the RBA's first female Governor.

== Monetary Policy Board ==
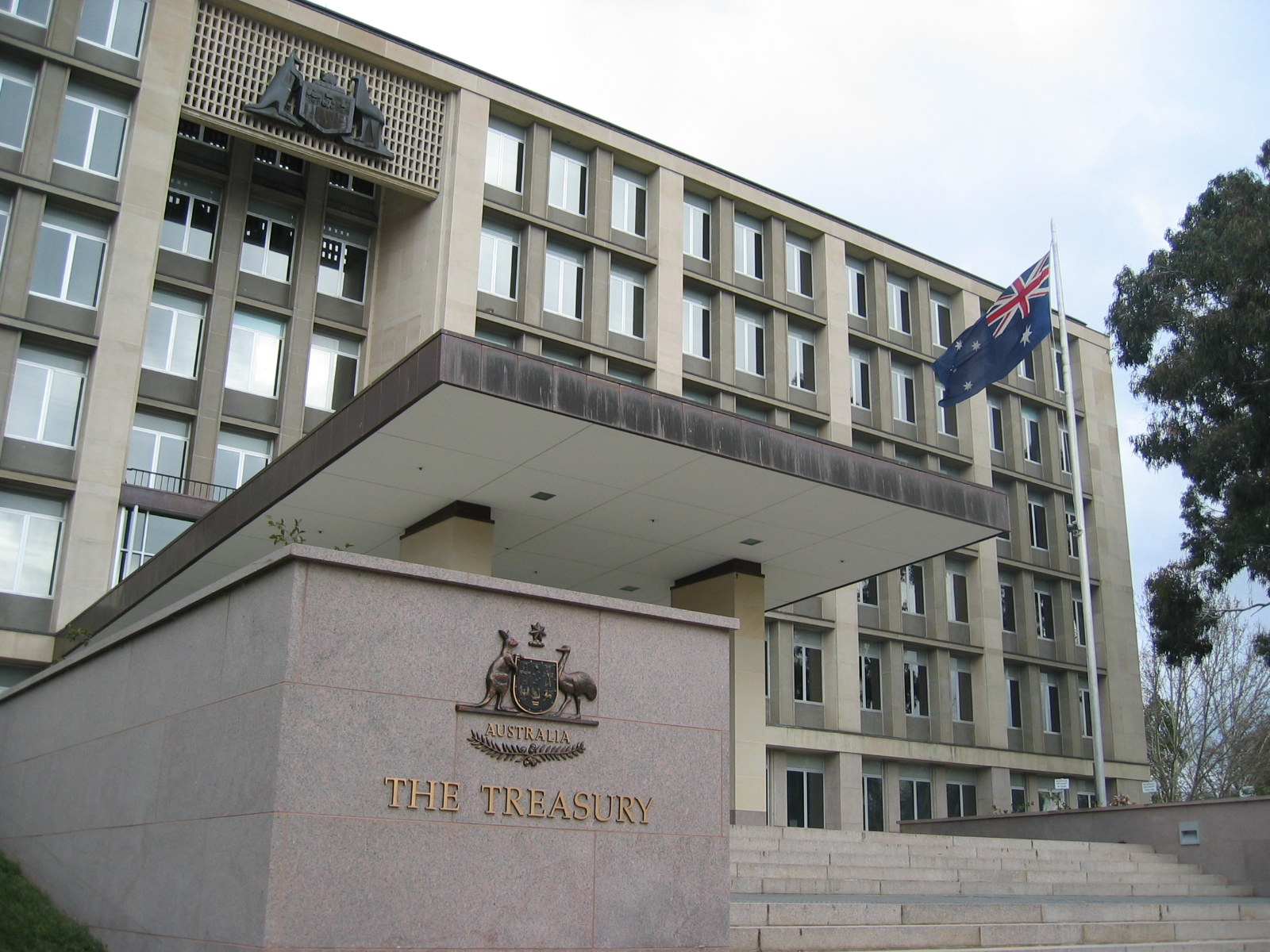
One ex officio member of the board is the Secretary to the Treasury (Treasury Department building seen here in Canberra).

The Reserve Bank's Monetary Policy Board consists of nine members: three ex officio members - the Governor (Chair), the Deputy Governor (Deputy Chair), and the Secretary to the Treasury, and six external members appointed by the Treasurer.

According to section 17(1) of the Reserve Bank Act, members of the board are not allowed to be a director, officer, or employee of an institution that is authorised to take in deposits. Excluding changes in the number of members, the structure of the board has remained unchanged since 1951.

The current members of the board are:

Name	Office (if applicable)	Term begins	Term ends^{A}
Ex officio members
Michele Bullock	Governor of the Reserve Bank (chair)	18 September 2023	17 September 2030
Andrew Hauser	Deputy Governor of the Reserve Bank (deputy chair)	12 February 2024	
Jenny Wilkinson	Secretary to the Treasury	16 June 2025	Indefinite
External members
Ian Harper	–	1 March 2025	31 August 2026
Carolyn Hewson	–	1 March 2025	28 February 2027
Iain Ross	–	1 March 2025	31 August 2028
Marnie Baker	–	1 March 2025	28 February 2030
Renée Fry-McKibbin	–	1 March 2025	28 February 2030
Bruce Preston	–	1 March 2026	28 February 2031

The board normally meets eight times each year, beginning on a Monday afternoon and concluding on Tuesday. Board meetings are usually held at the Reserve Bank's Head Office in Sydney. Five members of the board must meet in order to constitute a quorum, and the meeting must be chaired by the governor, or the deputy governor in their absence.

Starting from 2025, the RBA adjusted its monetary policy meeting schedule from 11 to 8 meetings per year. The Monetary Policy Board now meets in the months of: February, March, May, July, August, September, November, and December. This change aligns the RBA's practices with other central banks and allows for more comprehensive assessments of economic conditions.

The board usually forms a consensus without a need for structured voting on the issues at hand. Meetings of the board are held in the boardroom of the Reserve Bank's Head Office in Sydney or a similar facility in one of the bank's State Offices when meetings are held interstate (a secure location is used in Australian cities where the bank does not have its own premises).

== Payments System Board and Australian Competition & Consumer Commission ==
The Reserve Bank Act 1959 authorises the Payments System Board to decide the Reserve Bank's payments system policy. This is done so it can control risk, promote efficiency and to aid in competitiveness and balance in the financial system. The bank's power through the Payment Systems Act 1998 allows it to regulate any payment system and can create binding rules for security and performance in the system. If members of a payment system are at odds over issues of market risk, admission, safety and rivalry, the RBA can additionally administer arbitration with the consent of those involved. The RBA is also permitted to gather information from a payment system or participants thereof. The bank can also regulate the competition of transactions since August 2001.

The Payment Systems and Netting Act 1998 gives the board power in areas of the law that were previously uncertain. It removed the zero-hour rule that allowed a bankruptcy to date a bankruptcy the previous midnight and the Act made it so payments the same day could not be undone. Before the removal of the zero-hour rule, the real-time gross settlement system had been violated because payments in the system should inherently not be reversed. Some payments systems had previously agreed to pay and receive obligations to the whole system, rather than merely maintaining their own. But in the event of a bankruptcy, the bankrupt institution did not pay what it owed back to the solvent parties, while they had to pay their dues to the failed bank. This was later changed, when cheques were deemed void if the bankrupt institution does not have the funds to back them up, after the Cheques Act 1986 was amended in 1998. The Trade Practices Act 1974 generally does not allow competitors to make cooperative agreements, but the Australian Competition & Consumer Commission (ACCC) is permitted to make exceptions for competitors making agreements among themselves. The ACCC and the Payments Systems Board are encouraged to work together regarding access and rivalry through the Payment Systems (Regulation) Act 1998.

Members of the Payments System Board are defined by Section 25A of the Reserve Bank Act 1959, with three of the members being ex officio or representatives of another organisation. The governor of the Reserve Bank of Australia is the Chair of the Payments System Board, there is one representative of the RBA, and there is one representative of the Australian Prudential Regulation Authority (APRA). In addition, there are up to five other members of the board who are appointed by the Treasurer for a term of up to five years. The board meet once per quarter, usually in Sydney with five members forming a quorum, which must be chaired by the Governor or, in their absence, the Deputy Chair. The Chair of the RBA meets with the Chair of the ACCC at least once annually on issues of interest to both parties in the payments system, in addition to members of both organisations consulting over issues that are mutually important.

The current members of the Payments System Board are:

Name	Office (if applicable)	Term begins	Term ends^{A}
Ex officio or representative members
Michele Bullock	Governor of the Reserve Bank (chair)	18 September 2016	17 September 2023
Brad Jones	Deputy Governor of the Reserve Bank (deputy chair)	16 January 2024	16 January 2029
John Lonsdale	APRA representative	1 November 2022	Indefinite
External members
Ross P. Buckley	–	1 August 2023	31 July 2028
Gina Cass-Gottlieb	–	15 July 2013	31 July 2028
Michelle Deaker	–	1 August 2023	31 July 2028
Scott Farrell	–	23 March 2022	22 March 2027
Deborah Ralston	–	15 December 2016	14 December 2026

== History ==
From the middle of the 19th century into the 1890s, the prospects for the forming of a central bank grew. In 1911, the Commonwealth Bank was established, but did not have the authority to print notes, which function was still that of the Treasury. A movement toward re-establishing the gold standard occurred after World War I (1914–1918) with John Garvan leading various boards in contracting the money supply on the route to doing so, and the gold standard was instituted for both the British pound sterling and the Australian pound in 1925.

During the Great Depression, the Australian pound became devalued, no longer worth the same as the pound sterling, and formally departed from the gold standard with the Commonwealth Bank Act of 1932. Legislation in 1945 led to regulation of private banks which Herbert Coombs was opposed to, and when he became governor in 1949, he gave them more overall control over their institutions. When the monetary authorities implemented the advice of Coombs to have a flexible interest rate, it allowed the bank to rely more on open market operations. In 1980 the issue of short-term government bonds—Treasury notes of 13 and 26 weeks' duration—changed from a tap system, in which the price was set, to a tender system in which the volume of stock was set and the price determined by the market. Soon afterwards the tender system was extended to the issue of longer-term government bonds.

The float of the Australian dollar happened in 1983, around the same period of time that the financial system in Australia was deregulated. Administration of the banks was transferred in 1998 from the bank to the Australian Prudential Regulation Authority and the Payments System Board was created, while the bank was given power within the board in the same year. The current governor of the Reserve Bank is Michele Bullock, who succeeded Philip Lowe as governor on 18 September 2023.

In May 2022, the bank increased the nation's interest rates for the first time in more than a decade. This move was designed to combat high rates of inflation. The move generated considerable discussion, as it was taken during a federal election campaign that was focused on increased costs of living.

=== Mid-19th century–1924 ===
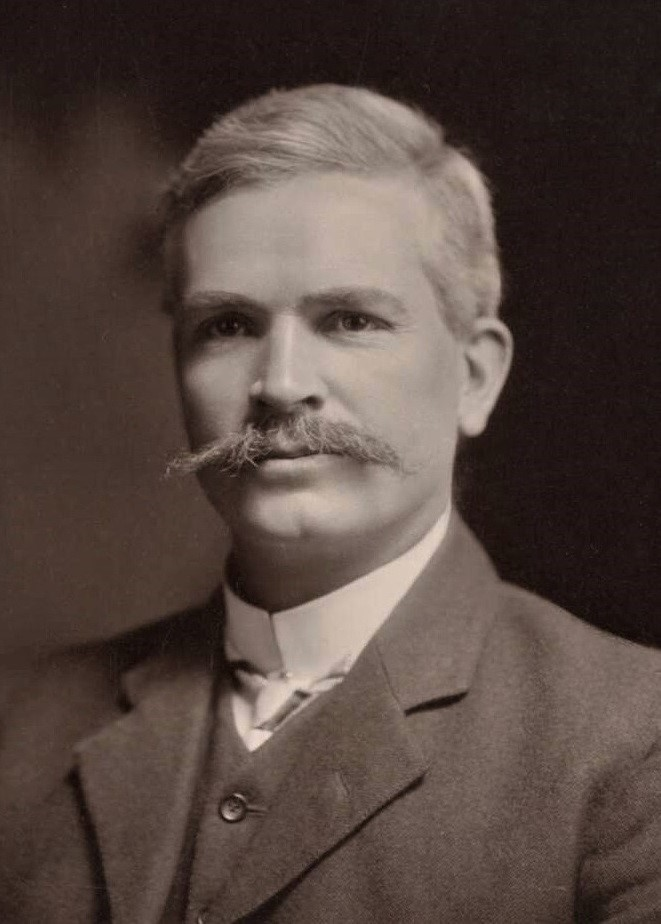
Prime Minister Andrew Fisher's government created a commercial bank owned by the government, but not a central bank.

Proposals for a national bank in Australia were first raised in the mid-19th century, and got a significant boost in the 1890s as a result of the Australian banking crisis of 1893 during which many commercial banks and building societies collapsed, leading to a general economic depression. The Australian Labor Party, formed during this period, proposed a bank which would be a protected and cheap way of providing financial services. The party's platform for the 1908 election was for a "Commonwealth Bank", which would have both commercial and central bank functions.

Regardless, Fisher's Labor government established the Commonwealth Bank by the Commonwealth Bank Act 1911, which came into effect on 22 December 1911. The new bank was a government-owned commercial bank, without any central bank functions. He stated that "Time and experience will show how its functions for usefulness may be extended [towards central banking]." The only function at the time that made the bank characteristic of a central one was that it was the banker to the Australian government, in addition to it being the same for the states. At the time, the Treasury of Australia maintained the role of issuing bank notes through the Australian Notes Act 1910. The bank was also the first bank in Australia to receive a federal government guarantee.

The Commonwealth Bank gradually acquired central bank functions. In response to the disruption of trade during World War I it was given responsibility to manage the Australian government debt. Nevertheless, at the end of the war, the bank's primary role was as a savings and trading bank. In the war, to fund the great increase in government spending, the currency of Australia went off the gold standard, as did those of the United Kingdom and other parts of the British Empire.

The Australian pound remained tied to the pound sterling. Inflation in Australia thus increased, less than in Britain, but more than in the United States. The case for a central bank was increased by the need for the government to cut spending after the war to reduce its debt. Commonwealth Bank Governor Denison Miller had been arguing for the issue of Australian currency to be switched from the treasury to the bank, as it had more staff and more monetary knowledge.

The Australian Notes Board (ANB) was created in 1920 and partially acceded to Miller's request, in having four directors, with the governor of the bank being an ex officio member. The ANB began to follow a policy of board member John Garvan, in contracting the money supply, with the goal of reducing prices so that free convertibility of the Australian pound to gold could be re-established at pre-war rates, that is return to the former gold standard.

This was accomplished by refusing the exchange of notes for gold and it was hoped that this would lower domestic prices and raise the exchange rate for the Australian pound. When gold arrived from New York the government sold securities to diminish the effect of monetary expansion, therefore executing the first open market operations in the history of Australia and thus the first attempt of central banking.

=== 1924–present ===
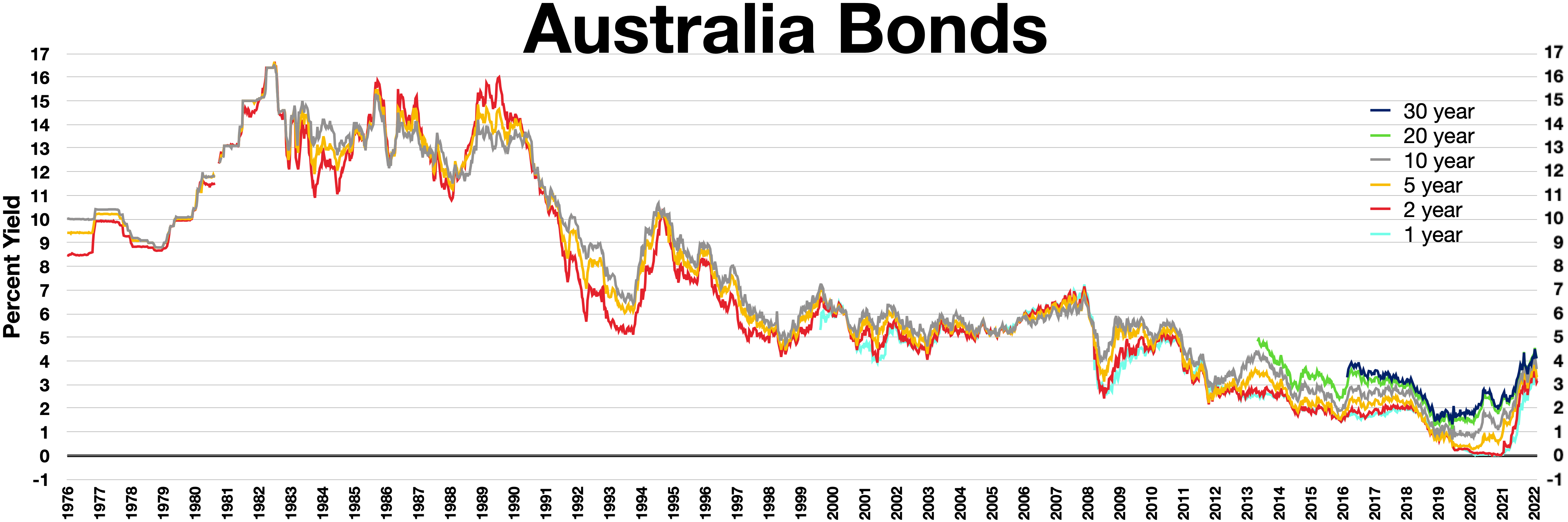
Australia bonds 30-year 20-year 10-year 5-year 2-year 1-year

The Australian Notes Board (ANB) was created in 1920, within the Department of Treasury, which issued notes until 1924, when this function was transferred to the Commonwealth Bank. The ANB was abolished by the Commonwealth Bank Act 1924.

The Treasurer and Country Party Leader Earle Page wanted to end the monetary contraction which particularly hurt his farming constituents, who were as a result receiving reduced export prices. The new board of directors replacing it, which was composed of various areas of the industry, soon appointed Garvan chairman, and thus he continued his policies. In 1925, both the pound sterling and Australian pound returned to the pre-war gold standard. The primary role of the Commonwealth Bank continued to be a savings and trading bank, even though the government attempted to make the bank into a central bank through its actions in 1924.

Legislation was introduced to the Parliament at the height of the Great Depression, in May 1930, by Treasurer E.G. Theodore, to transfer central banking powers from the Commonwealth Bank to a new central bank, but this failed. The Australian pound was devalued in 1931 and it ceased to be tied to the pound sterling. The Reserve Bank departed from the gold standard with the Commonwealth Bank Act 1932, which made the notes no longer exchangeable into gold and allowed the bank not to keep any gold reserves. The monetary policy of the bank from 1931 until the early 1970s had been to maintain a stable exchange rate with the pound sterling.

Through the new Commonwealth Bank Act and the Banking Act 1945, the board was replaced by a six-member council, consisting of bank and treasury officials. It additionally formalised the bank's administrative powers of monetary and banking policy and exchange control and also stated the governor was responsible for managing the bank. Highly debated legislation in 1945 caused high amounts of regulation on private banks, which later-Governor H.C. Coombs was opposed to, along with his opposition to bank nationalisation in 1947. When he became governor in 1949, he allowed private banks to have more control over their liquidity and attempted to introduce market-based monetary policy. He also warned of the possibility of stagflation in 1959.

Legislation in 1951, substituted the council by a 10-member board which included the governor, deputy governor and the secretary to the treasury. The board took over the management of the bank from the governor. The Reserve Bank Act 1959 (23 April 1959) took out the part of the Commonwealth Bank that executed central bank functions and placed it into the Reserve Bank, while the commercial and savings bank functions stayed with the Commonwealth Bank. This finally created a separate central bank for Australia in 1959, which took effect 14 January 1960, many years after several other nations already had one and similar to the early proposal by Treasurer Theodore.

In the mid-1960s, monetary authorities accepted Coombs' conclusions and allowed a flexible interest rate, making it easier for the bank to rely on open market operations. The Exchange Control was abolished after the float of the Australian dollar occurred in 1983. In the five years after the Campbell Committee probe, 1979–1984, the financial system in Australia became deregulated. Another probe was the Wallis Committee in 1996, which took effect in 1998. The effects were the transfer of overseeing the banks from the RBA to the Australian Prudential Regulation Authority (APRA) and the creation of the Payments System Board (PSB), which would attempt to maintain the safety and performance of the payments system. The bank was given powers within the PSB through additional legislation in 1998.

In August 1996, then bank Governor-designate Ian Macfarlane and the Treasurer issued a Statement on the Conduct of Monetary Policy which restated the roles of the Reserve Bank and the Government of Australia. It affirmed government endorsement of the Reserve Bank's inflation objective, which was introduced in 1993. A change of government in November 2007 led to another Statement, which was issued by both then-Treasurer Wayne Swan and Reserve Bank Governor Glenn Stevens. This amends previous statements by giving the bank independence and encourages transparency and communication.

In November 2024, a Bill was passed through Parliament that split the RBA into two separate boards, one to create monetary policy targets, and one for simply governing the bank such as its use of Information Technology devices.

In January 2026, the central bank raised key interest rate for the first time in 2 years to 2.58% due to unexpectedly high inflation and unemployment hit a seven-month low in December.

== Securency scandal ==
Since 2007, the RBA's reputation has been affected by the 'Securency' or Note Printing Australia scandal. These RBA subsidiaries were involved in bribing overseas officials so that Australia might win lucrative polymer note-printing contracts. Australian press coverage, which continued into late 2011, reflects concerns with the apparent laxity and tardiness of corrective actions undertaken by relevant RBA board members and officials. The matters were not reported to the Federal Police in 2007, although they have been since, while in 2011 it was revealed that the RBA had to correct inaccurate evidence previously given to parliamentary committees. Former senior executives were charged with foreign bribery offences under the Criminal Code Amendment (Bribery of Foreign Public Officials) Act 1999. In these proceedings, two of the executives were represented by William "Bill" Doogue. Ultimately, no one received a custodial sentence for these charges.

In July 2014, WikiLeaks released a copy of a court order prohibiting publication throughout Australia of information that "reveals, implies, suggests or alleges" corruption involving specifically named past and present high-ranking Malaysian, Indonesian and Vietnamese officials in relation to the Note Printing Australia bribery allegations.

== Heritage listings ==
Reserve Bank of Australia Building, Canberra

The following Reserve Bank buildings are included on the Australian Commonwealth Heritage List:

- 20-22 London Circuit, Canberra: Reserve Bank of Australia Building, Canberra
- 65 Martin Place, Sydney: Reserve Bank of Australia Building, Sydney

== See also ==
- Australian dollar
- Australian Prudential Regulation Authority
- Bank Notes Tax Act 1910
- Banking in Australia
- Central bank
- Note Printing Australia
- Official cash rate
- Royal Australian Mint
- List of central banks
- Bank of International Settlement

== Notes ==
- ^A Members are eligible to be appointed to another term.
