= Coins of the Hong Kong dollar =

Obverse and reverses of Hong Kong coins – Bauhinia series since 1993

The Hong Kong coinage, including 10¢, 20¢, 50¢, $1, $2, $5 & $10, is issued by Hong Kong Monetary Authority on behalf of the Government of Hong Kong. From 1863 until 1992, these coins were embossed with the reigning British monarch's effigy. Since 1 January 1993, a new series depicting the bauhinia flower was gradually issued, including a new denomination of $10. Since the beginning of the coin replacement programme on 1 January 1993, over 585 million coins featuring Queen Elizabeth II have been withdrawn from circulation. However, these coins remain legal tender. The total value of coins in circulation in Hong Kong can be found in the Monthly Statistical Bulletin and the Annual Report.

== Historical denominations ==
=== Discontinued denominations ===
The following coin denominations are no longer circulated by the HKMA.

- The 1 mill coin was discontinued due to its unpopularity.
- 1 cent last issued in 1934, but the last mintage which was melted down by the Japanese or lost was dated 1941.
- The 5 cent coin was last issued in 1979 and minted for uncirculated coin sets in 1988.

Value	Diameter	Weight	Thickness	Edge
1 mill 1863–1866	15 mm	0.98 gr	0.8 mm	Plain
1 cent 1863–1926	27 mm	7.53 g	1.8 mm	Plain
1 cent 1931–1941	21.5 mm	4.05 g	1.8 mm	Plain
5 cent 1866–1935	15 mm	1.34 g	0.8 mm	Reeded
5 cent 1937–1988	16.51 mm	2.59 g	1.73 mm	Reeded and reeded security edge

=== Denominations with specifications changed ===
The following current denominations that have changed in size, shape, and or metal content.

Denomination	Details
One-cent coin	First issued in 1863, the one-cent copper coin had a larger diameter of 27.8mm. The size remained unchanged until 1902 when the coin was reduced in size to 22mm.
Five-cent coin	From 1866 to 1933, the five-cent coin was struck in silver. After Hong Kong abandoned the silver standard in 1935, the coin's composition was changed to copper-nickel, and later nickel-brass in 1949 until its final issue in 1988.
Ten-cent coin	The ten-cent coin was first issued as a circular coin in 0.800 fineness silver in 1866. The coin's composition was changed to nickel in 1935, and to nickel-brass in 1948. The overall design was changed in 1982, becoming a nickel-brass coin 17.5mm in diameter.
Twenty-cent coin	The twenty-cent coin was first issued as a circular coin in 0.800 fineness silver in 1866. The overall design was changed in 1975, becoming a scallop-shaped nickel-brass coin.
Fifty-cent coin	First issued by the Hong Kong government from 1866 to 1868, the fifty-cent coin contained 90% silver and had a diameter of 32mm. During the reign of George VI, this denomination was re-introduced, struck in copper-nickel and with a reduced diameter of 23.5mm. In 1977, a nickel-brass coin with a similar design was issued, except for the further reduced diameter.
One-dollar coin	The dollar coin experienced three stages of change. First issued from 1866 to 1868, it was minted in 90% silver with a 38mm diameter. The coin was re-introduced in 1960, where copper-nickel coins with a diameter of 29.8mm were issued. The coin was most recently re-sized in 1978, in which the diameter was further reduced to 25.5mm.
Five-dollar coin	The first series of decagon shaped five-dollar coin was issued in 1976. Yet, as it was easily counterfeited during that era, the colonial government decided to change the design of the five-dollar coin to a circle-shaped design with security edge starting 1980.

== Coins in circulation before 1992 ==
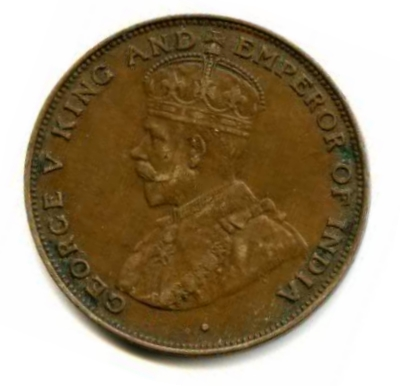
1 cent coin minted during the reign of King George V.

Fifty cent 1952–1993

Queen Victoria series (1866–1901)

King Edward VII series (1902–1910)

King George V series (1911–1936)

King George VI series (1937–1951)

Queen Elizabeth II series (1952–1992)

Queen Elizabeth II Series
Value	Description		Date of	
Value	Obverse	Reverse	first minting	issue
10¢	King George VI, "KING GEORGE THE SIXTH"	Value, title of the country, year of minting	1948	
10¢	Queen Elizabeth II, "QUEEN ELIZABETH THE SECOND"	Value, title of the country, year of minting	1955	
20¢	Queen Elizabeth II, "QUEEN ELIZABETH THE SECOND"	Value, title of the country, year of minting	1975	
50¢	King George VI, "KING GEORGE THE SIXTH"	Value, title of the country, year of minting	1951	
50¢	Queen Elizabeth II, "QUEEN ELIZABETH THE SECOND"	Value, title of the country, year of minting	1958	
$1	Queen Elizabeth II, "QUEEN ELIZABETH THE SECOND"	Crest in the Coat of Arms of Hong Kong, value, title of the country, year of minting	1960	
$2	Queen Elizabeth II, "QUEEN ELIZABETH THE SECOND"	Crest in the Coat of Arms of Hong Kong, value, title of the country, year of minting	1975	
$5	Queen Elizabeth II, "QUEEN ELIZABETH THE SECOND"	Crest in the Coat of Arms of Hong Kong, value, title of the country, year of minting	1976	
$5	Queen Elizabeth II, "QUEEN ELIZABETH THE SECOND"	Value, title of the country, year of minting	1980	

== Coins in circulation since 1993 ==
Since the introduction of the Octopus card in 1997, small value payments and purchases in Hong Kong are mostly made as Octopus transactions. The Hong Kong Monetary Authority did not issue any new coinage from 1999 to 2011 as the territory had stored enough for use. The increased consumption of coins in the territory since 2004 would influence the Hong Kong Monetary Authority to resume minting coins in 2012.

The obverse of newer coin bear the standard bauhinia, with the word "Hong Kong" in Chinese characters and English. The reverse features the denomination in Chinese characters and English with a large Arabic numeral in the centre and the year of issue below.

Bauhinia Series (since 1993)
Value	Specifications				Description		Date of	
Value	Diameter	Mass	Edge	Composition	Obverse	Reverse	first minting	issue
10-cent	17.5 mm	1.85 g	plain	brass-plated steel	Bauhinia, "HONG KONG"	Value, year of minting	1993	1 January 1993
20-cent	18.0-19.0 mm	2.59 g	scalloped	brass-plated steel	Bauhinia, "HONG KONG"	Value, year of minting	1993	1 January 1993
50-cent	22.5 mm	4.92 g	milled	brass-plated steel	Bauhinia, "HONG KONG"	Value, year of minting	1993	1 January 1993
HK$1	25.5 mm	7.1 g	milled	cupronickel	Bauhinia, "HONG KONG"	Value, year of minting	1993	1 January 1993
HK$2	26.3-28.0 mm	8.41 g	scalloped	cupronickel	Bauhinia, "HONG KONG"	Value, year of minting	1993	1 January 1993
HK$5	27.0 mm	13.5 g	milled with lettered middle groove	cupronickel	Bauhinia, "HONG KONG"	Value, year of minting	1993	1 January 1993
HK$10(Non commemorative variant)	24.0 mm	11.0 g	alternate plain & milled	cupronickel ring, brass center	Bauhinia, "HONG KONG"	Value, year of minting	1994	1 January 1994

=== Security features ===
The $10 coin is made of two metals: a white nickel alloy outer ring and a brass inner core. The standard bauhinia on the obverse gives a sharp embossed image. The neat bonding between the outer and inner rings gives it another unique feature. The $10 coin has an alternate plain and milled edge. The $5 coin has a milled edge. A groove running within the milled edging contains raised English and Chinese characters, which read "Hong Kong Five Dollars". The $1 and 50¢ coins have simple milled edges. The $2 and 20¢ coins have scalloped edges. The 10¢ coin has a plain edge. Under Hong Kong law (sections 98 – 102 of Cap. 200), anyone who makes or possesses or controls or passes any counterfeit note or coin commits an offense and is liable on conviction to imprisonment for up to 14 years.

== Commemorative coins and coin sets ==
=== Commemorative coins issued before 1997 ===
Lunar Zodiac Animal coin set, 1976–1986
Royal Visit, 1975

Royal Visit, 1986

Proof Coin Collection, 1988

=== Commemorative coins issued after 1997 ===
==== Opening of the Lantau Link, May 1997 ====
To mark the opening of the Lantau Link, the HKMA issued a philatelic numismatic cover in May 1997, the first of its kind in Hong Kong. The Lantau Link is the first road link between Lantau Island, where the new airport is located, and the rest of Hong Kong.

==== Establishment of the Hong Kong Special Administrative Region, July 1997 ====
To commemorate the establishment of the Hong Kong Special Administrative Region on 1 July 1997, the HKMA, on behalf of the Government, issued a HK$1,000 commemorative proof gold coin, 97,000 proof sets and an unknown number of brilliant uncirculated set of seven coins with the same denominations as the coins currently in circulation. On the obverse side of each of these seven coins is the standard Bauhinia design, with a special commemorative design and denomination on the reverse.

==== Opening of the Hong Kong International Airport, July 1998 ====
To mark the opening of the Hong Kong International Airport in July 1998, 15,000 $1,000 commemorative proof gold coin was issued. The gold coin features a design symbolising Hong Kong's ascent into the new century and bears the standard Bauhinia design on the obverse side.

==== The Five Blessings Commemorative Coin Set, February 2002 ====
To mark the fifth year of the establishment of the Hong Kong Special Administrative Region, the HKMA, on behalf of the Government, issued 60,000 limited edition coin set that consists of five HK$50 silver coins with a gold-plated inner core, and a 9999 pure gold medallion. The five silver coins are individually engraved with a phrase and symbol of traditional blessing.

== Coins sources ==
List of mints that issued Hong Kong's coins in the past:

- Royal Mint, London
- Royal Mint, Hong Kong branch
- James Watt and Company Soho, Birmingham
- R. Heaton and Sons Limited (now The Mint, Birmingham Limited)
- King's Norton Metal Company Limited
