= Hong Kong one thousand-dollar note =

One thousand Dollars
- Region: Hong Kong
- Value: 1000 Hong Kong dollars
- Width: 163 or 165 mm
- Height: 81.5 or 82 mm
- Security features: Window, Watermark, Security thread, Registration device, Latent image, Optically Variable Ink, Iridescent image
- Material used: Cotton
- Years of printing: 1860s, 1977-present (various years depending on banks)

The one thousand-dollar note is the highest-valued banknote in circulation in Hong Kong. Currently, this note is issued by the Hongkong and Shanghai Banking Corporation (HSBC), Standard Chartered Hong Kong, and the Bank of China. Due to its gold-colored theme, this note was nicknamed “Gold Cow (Chinese: 金牛; Jyutping: gam1 ngau4)” by the locals, derived from the term “Big Cow (大牛; daai6 ngau4)” that is used for the city's five hundred-dollar note. If counted according to the notes’ serial number, it is the note with the second-lowest printing figure, higher than that of the fifty-dollar note.

== History ==
Proof issues were made by the Oriental Bank Corporation and the Bank of Hindustan, China and Japan during the 1860s. However, due to the low price level in that era, those notes are currently extremely rare.

It was not until 31 March 1977 that the first circulating note was issued by the HSBC with a dimension of 100mm by 173mm. Later on 6 March 1979, the Standard Chartered Bank (Hong Kong) issued its own one thousand-dollar note, with a dimension of 100mm by 170mm.

Since 1985, the note issued by both banks were redesigned with a shrunk size of 81.5mm by 163mm. In 1988, a lighter shade of gold was used by the HSBC as the previous selection of colour was overly dark. The same change could also be seen on the twenty-dollar note and the one hundred-dollar note of HSBC during this decade.

As the date of the transfer of sovereignty over Hong Kong was approaching, the two note-issuing banks modified their design in 1993 to tune down the British elements. In 1994, the Bank of China became the third note-issuing bank in the territory.

Changes of design were made in the year 2003, 2010 and subsequently in 2018 to add in new security features.

== Nickname of the notes ==
Other than the aforementioned nickname of “Gold Cow (金牛)” as a general reference to this particular denomination, other nicknames were also adopted by the locals and especially the numismatic community in Hong Kong. Some issues, especially those issued by the Bank of China, may not have a common nickname due to its relatively short history.

Notes issued by HSBC:

- 1977-1983 Big Golden Lion (大金獅; daai6 gam1 si1)
- 1985-1987 Goldfish yellow (金魚黃; gam1 jyu4 wong4)
- 1988-1991 Salted Egg Yolk (鹹蛋黃; haam4 daan6 wong4)
- 1993-2002 Side-face Lion (側獅; zak1 si1)
- 2003-2009 Front-face Lion (正獅; zing3 si1)

Notes issued by Standard Chartered:

- 1979-1982 Big Golden Dragon (大金龍; daai6 gam1 lung4)
- 1985-1992 Long-stick Dragon (長棍龍; coeng4 gwan3 lung4)
- 1993-2002 Short-stick Dragon (短棍龍; dyun2 gwan3 lung4)
