= Hong Kong dollar =

Currency of Hong Kong

港元 (Chinese)

ISO 4217
- Code: HKD (numeric: 344)
- Subunit: 0.01

Units of account
- Base unit: dollar (English) 元 (Chinese)
- Plural: dollars (English only)
- Symbol: $
- Subunit
- 1/10: 毫 (Chinese only)
- 1/100: cent (English) 仙 (Chinese)
- 1/1000 (historical): mil (English) 文 (Chinese)
- Plural
- cent (English) 仙 (Chinese): cents (English only)

Denominations
- Banknotes
- Freq. used: HK$10, HK$20, HK$50, HK$100, HK$500, HK$1,000
- Rarely used: HK$150 (Commemorative note)
- Coins
- Freq. used: 10¢, 20¢, 50¢, HK$1, HK$2, HK$5
- Rarely used: HK$10

Demographics
- Date of introduction: 1846
- Official user(s): Hong Kong
- Unofficial user: Macau (alongside Macanese pataca)

Issuance
- Monetary authority: Hong Kong Monetary Authority
- Website: www.hkma.gov.hk
- Printer: Hong Kong Note Printing Issuing banks and authority: Government of the Hong Kong Special Administrative Region; The Hong Kong and Shanghai Banking Corporation (HSBC); Standard Chartered (Hong Kong); Bank of China (Hong Kong)

Valuation
- Inflation: 1.7% (March 2022 est.)
- Pegged with: U.S. Dollar (USD); US$1.00 USD = HK$7.80±0.05
- Pegged by: Macanese pataca (MOP$); HK$1.00 = MOP$1.03

Hong Kong dollar
- Chinese: 港元
- Cantonese Yale: Góng yùn
- Literal meaning: (Hong) Kong dollar
Transcriptions
Standard Mandarin
- Hanyu Pinyin: Gǎngyuán
- Bopomofo: ㄍㄤˇ ㄩㄢˊ
- Wade–Giles: Kang3-yüan2
- IPA: [kàŋ ɥɛ̌n]
Yue: Cantonese
- Yale Romanization: Góng yùn
- Jyutping: Gong2 jyun4
- Sidney Lau: Gong^{2} yuen^{4}
- Canton Romanization: Gong2 yun4
- Hong Kong Romanisation: Kong yun
- IPA: [kɔ̌ːŋ y̏n]

Alternative Chinese name
- Traditional Chinese: 港幣
- Simplified Chinese: 港币
- Cantonese Yale: Góng bàih
- Literal meaning: (Hong) Kong coin
Transcriptions
Standard Mandarin
- Hanyu Pinyin: Gǎngbì
- Wade–Giles: Kang3-pi4
Yue: Cantonese
- Yale Romanization: Góng bàih
- Jyutping: Gong2 bai6

The Hong Kong dollar (Chinese: 港元, symbol: $; code: HKD) is the official currency of Hong Kong. Each dollar is divided into 100 cents (or fen). Historically, it was also divided into 1000 mils. The Hong Kong Monetary Authority is the monetary authority of Hong Kong and the Hong Kong dollar.

Three commercial banks are licensed by the Hong Kong Monetary Authority to issue their own banknotes for general circulation in Hong Kong. These banks — HSBC, Bank of China, and Standard Chartered — issue their own designs of banknotes in denominations of HK$20, HK$50, HK$100, HK$150, HK$500, and HK$1000, with all designs being similar to one another in the same denomination of banknote. However, the HK$10 banknote and all coins are issued by the Government of Hong Kong.

As of April 2019, the Hong Kong dollar was the ninth-most traded currency in the world. Hong Kong uses a linked exchange rate system, trading since May 2005 in the range US$1:HK$7.75–7.85.

Apart from its use in Hong Kong, the Hong Kong dollar is also used in neighbouring Macau. It is pegged at 1 Hong Kong dollar to 1.03 Macanese patacas, and is generally accepted at par or MOP 1.00 for retail purchases.

== History ==
When Hong Kong was established as a free trading port in 1841, there was no local currency in everyday circulation. Foreign currencies such as Indian rupees, Spanish or Mexican 8 reales, and Chinese cash coins were circulated instead. Since 1825, it had been the policy of the British government to introduce sterling silver coinage to all of its colonies, and to this end, in 1845, the Spanish or Mexican 8 reales coins were set at a legal tender value of 4 shillings, 2 pence sterling (50 pre-decimal pence). But just as in the case of the British North American colonies, the attempts to introduce the sterling coinage failed to overcome the strong local adherence to the silver Spanish dollar system that had been in wide circulation across the Far East, emanating for centuries from Manila in the Philippines as part of the Spanish East Indies in the Spanish colonial empire through the Manila-Acapulco Galleon Trade with the coins minted in the Spanish Americas in Mexico or Peru or Bolivia.

By 1858, the British government gave up all attempts to influence the currency situation in Canada, and by the 1860s, it came to the same realisation in Hong Kong: that there was no point in trying to displace an already existing currency system. In 1863, the Royal Mint in London began issuing special subsidiary coinage for use in Hong Kong within the dollar system, though other national currencies circulated unofficially for years afterwards. In 1866, a local mint was established at Cleveland Street in Causeway Bay on Hong Kong Island for the purpose of minting Hong Kong silver dollar and half dollar coins of the same value and similar likeness to their Spanish/Mexican counterparts. The Chinese did not, however, receive these new Hong Kong dollars well, and in 1868, the Hong Kong Mint was closed down with a loss of $440,000. The machinery at the Hong Kong mint was sold first to Jardine Matheson and, in turn, to the Japanese and used to make the first Yen coins in 1870. In the 1860s, banknotes of the new British colonial banks, the Hong Kong and Shanghai Banking Corporation and the Chartered Bank of India, Australia and China, denominated in dollars, also began to circulate in both Hong Kong and the wider region.

In 1873, the international silver crisis resulted in a devaluation of silver against gold-based currencies. Since the silver dollars in the US and Canada were attached to a gold exchange standard, this meant that the silver dollars circulating along the China coast dropped in value as compared to the U.S. dollar and the Canadian dollar.

=== Early 20th century ===
By 1895, the circumstances had changed to the extent that there was now a dearth of Spanish/Mexican dollars and the authorities in both Hong Kong and the Straits Settlements were putting pressure on the authorities in London to take measures to have a regular supply of silver dollar coins. London eventually acquiesced and legislation was enacted in attempts to regulate the coinage. New British trade dollars were coined at the mints in Calcutta and Bombay for use in both Hong Kong and the Straits Settlements. In 1906, the Straits Settlements issued their own silver dollar coin and attached it to a gold sterling exchange standard at a fixed value of 2 shillings and 4 pence. This was the point of departure between the Hong Kong unit and the Straits unit.

In British Weihaiwei, the Hong Kong dollar circulated jointly with the Chinese yuan from 1914 to 1930, when Weihaiwei was returned to the Republic of China.

By 1935, only Hong Kong and China remained on the silver standard. In that year, Hong Kong, shortly after China did, abandoned silver and introduced a crawling peg to sterling of £1 = HK$15.36 to HK$16.45. It was from this point in time that the concept of a Hong Kong dollar as a distinct unit of currency came into existence. The One-Dollar Currency Note Ordinance of that year led to the introduction of one-dollar notes by the government and the government acknowledged the Hong Kong dollar as the local monetary unit. It was not until 1937 that the legal tender of Hong Kong was finally unified. In 1939, the Hong Kong dollar was put on a fixed peg of HK$16 = £1 ($1 = 1s 3d).

The discussion about switching from the silver standard to the gold standard began as early as 1930. A commission report was released in May 1931 which concluded that it was important for Hong Kong to facilitate the free flow of capital with China and adhering to the same monetary standard as China was thus preferred. The report also recommended the Hong Kong government only take over the burden of note issuance when the banks failed to do so. In fact, the Hong Kong government was not willing to take up the logistics of note issuance, and some officials even thought that the public had greater degree of confidence in the notes issued by those long-established banks than that by the government.

During the Japanese occupation, the Japanese military yen were the only means of everyday exchange in Hong Kong. When the yen was first introduced on 26 December 1941, the exchange rate was ¥1 = HK$2. However, in August 1942, the rate was changed to HK$4 to ¥1. The yen became the only legal tender on 1 June 1943. The issue of local currency was resumed by the Hong Kong government and authorised local banks after liberation, with the pre-war rate of HK$16 = £1 being restored. The yen was exchanged at a rate of ¥100 = HK$1. On 6 September 1945, all military yen notes used in Japanese colonies were declared void by the Japanese Ministry of Finance.

=== Post-WWII period ===
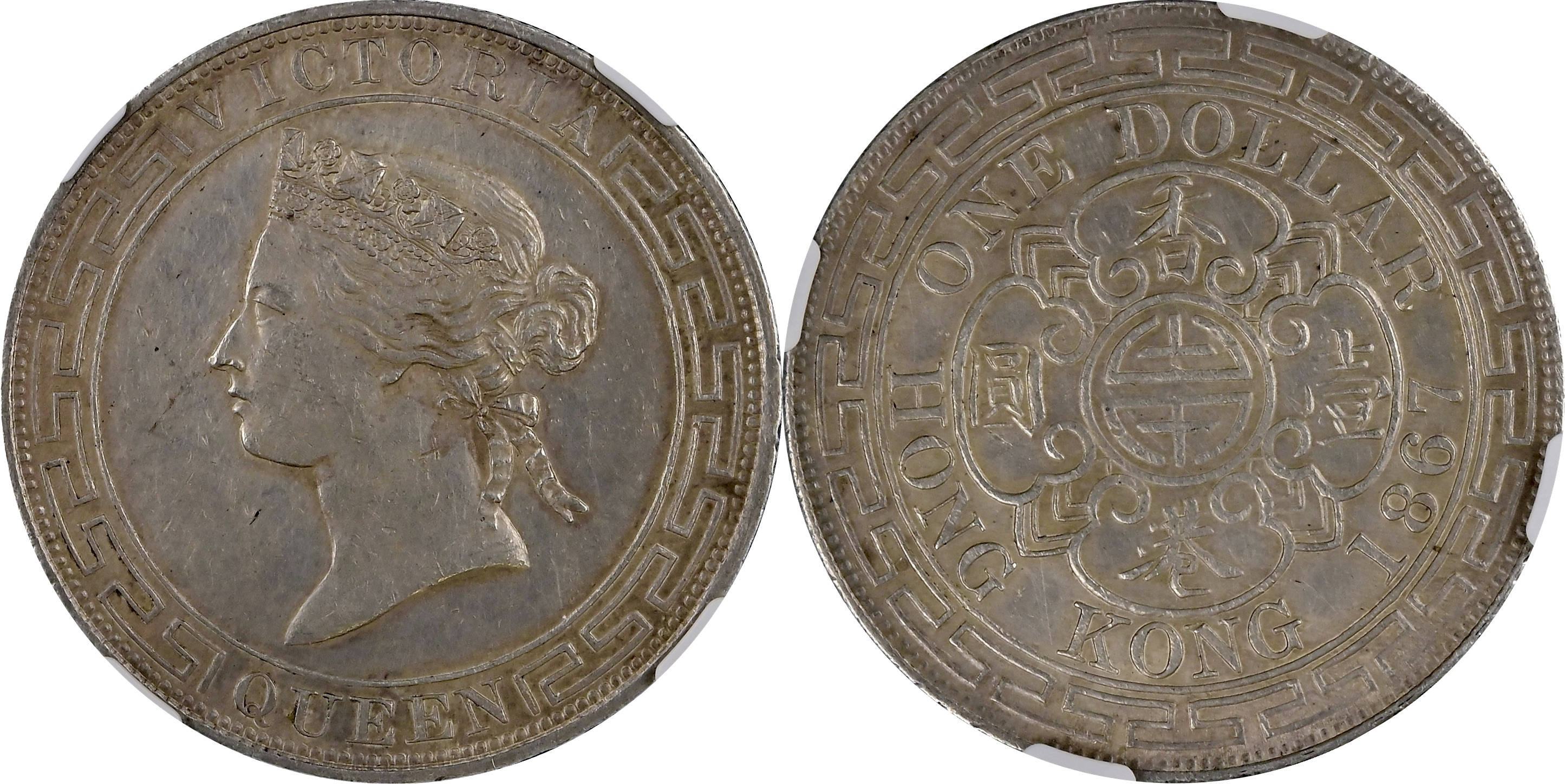
Silver coin: 1 dollar Victoria of Hong Kong, issued in 1866, 1867, 1868, it was the first official currency of British Hong Kong and also the first trade dollar in the Far East.

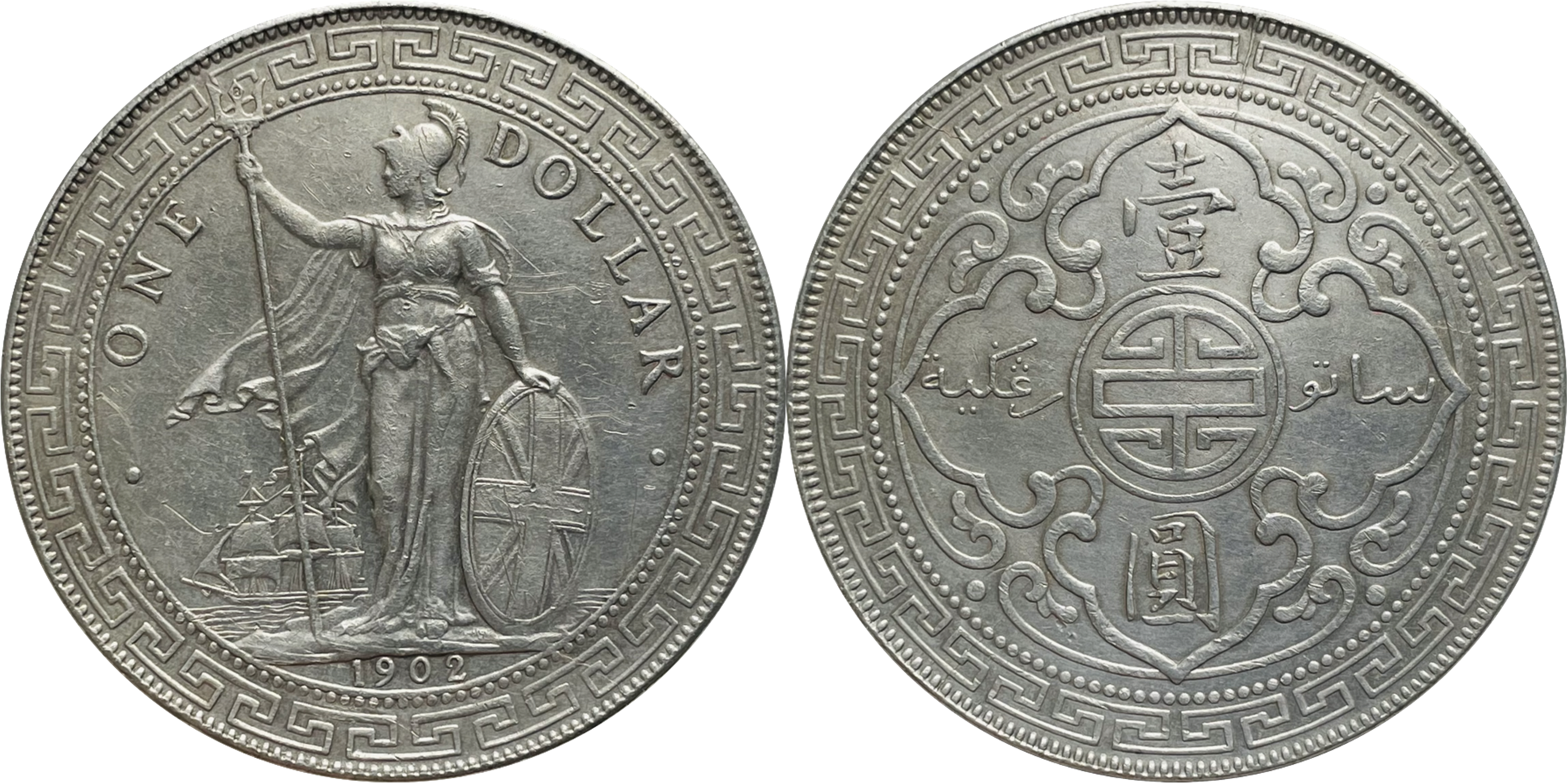
Silver coin: 1 British Trade Dollar, issued from 1895 to 1935, was originally used for the British colonies and protectorates in the Far East, including British Hong Kong, the Straits Settlements... but after the introduction of the Straits dollar in 1903, the British trade dollar was only used by Hong Kong.

==== The Hong Kong dollar in the sterling area ====
After the end of the Second World War, the Hong Kong dollar was re-pegged to sterling at a fixed rate identical to the pre-war level. Meanwhile, the United Kingdom made efforts to maintain the sterling area with countries of the British Commonwealth as well as its colonies. It imposed exchange controls on non-sterling area countries, barring them from freely converting British pounds into US dollars, but no such restriction was placed on sterling area countries. As a colony of the British Empire, Hong Kong was obliged to observe the sterling area regulations. Nevertheless, its unique geo-economic position afforded Hong Kong the ability to defy exchange controls by operating a dual system with the sterling area and a free exchange market principally with the US dollar, which was technically illegal from 1949 to 1967. Hong Kong economy specialist Leo Goodstadt argues that ministers and officials in London were bound to tolerate Hong Kong's situation, given Hong Kong's extensive trade with China, and the long collusion between officials in Hong Kong, bankers and local business communities. The People's Republic of China (PRC), established by the Chinese Communist Party in 1949, was in dire need of foreign currency, especially after the Korean War (1950–1953) and the Sino-Soviet split in the early 1960s, for international trade with countries of non-Soviet blocs. The British sterling obtained through Hong Kong was able to finance 28% and 46% of the PRC's total imports from 1963 to 1967 and from 1970 to 1971 respectively. Of the British sterling obtained by the PRC through Hong Kong during 1953 and 1971, about 40–50% was supplied by the Hongkong and Shanghai Banking Corporation (HSBC), the de facto "central bank" in Hong Kong, which accounted for 10% of annual foreign currency needed by the PRC in the period.

==== The impacts of the devaluation of the pound in 1967 ====
In the 1960s, the UK found it difficult to keep the value of sterling as it was, with its role as official reserve currency even within the sterling area. In 1964, sterling was 83% of the official reserves of overseas sterling area countries, but this share had decreased to 75% in 1966 and to 65% in 1967. When sterling was devalued by the UK in 1967, the Hong Kong dollar's peg to the pound resulted in a re-valuation from $16 to $14.5, a 10% devaluation against the pound and 5.7% devaluation against the US dollar. The unilateral devaluation sparked a circle of grievances among local business communities as well as colonial officials in Hong Kong because the official reserves and private savings in sterling were substantial in Hong Kong. In the 1950–60s, as Hong Kong accumulated significant reserves in sterling with its economic growth, the money supply was exponentially expanded from £140–£160 million in the late 1950s to £363 million in October 1967, equivalent to 10% of the UK's total sterling liabilities to the overseas sterling area before the devaluation. Subsequently, Hong Kong and London engaged in talks about compensation and protection against further losses. Considering the potential diversification of official reserves from sterling to the US dollars by Hong Kong government officials, London agreed to offer exchange guarantees to protect Hong Kong against any potential devaluation of sterling in the future, the first to receive such guarantees among the sterling area countries.

==== Floating currency system, 1974–1983 ====
After the US's cessation of the convertibility between gold and the U.S. dollar in October 1971, Britain abandoned the fixed exchange rate with the U.S. dollar and extended the exchange controls also to the sterling area countries, which put an effective end to the sterling area in 1972. In the same year, the Hong Kong dollar was pegged to the U.S. dollar at a rate of HK$5.65 = US$1, revised to HK$5.085 = US$1 in 1973. From 1974 to 1983, the Hong Kong dollar was not anchored to another currency, changing the monetary regime from a currency board system to a floating currency system.

==== Linked exchange rate system since 1983 ====
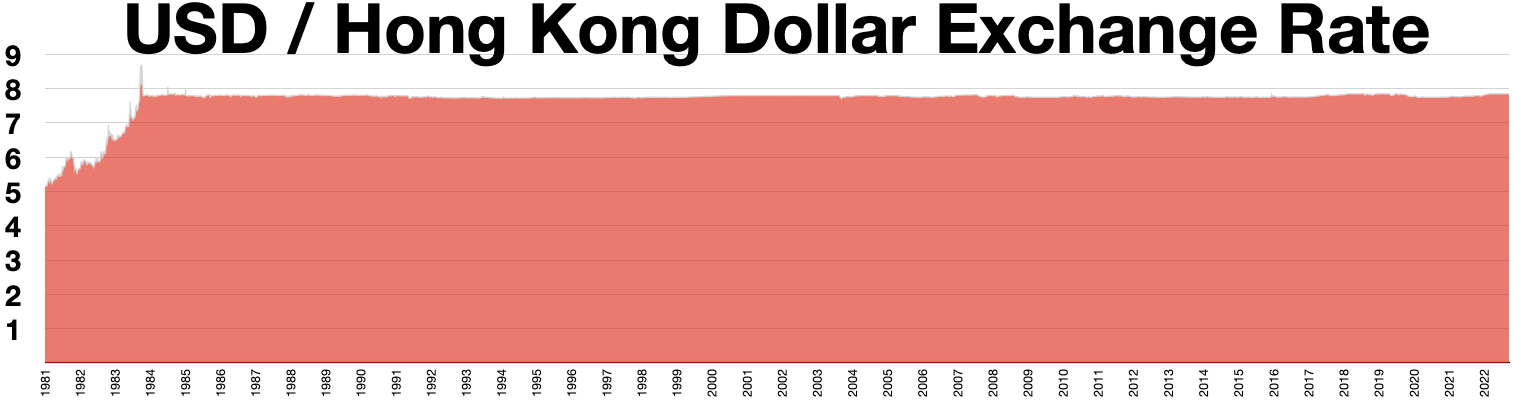
USD / Hong Kong Dollar exchange rate

On 17 October 1983, the Hong Kong dollar was officially pegged to the U.S. dollar at a rate of HK$7.80 = US$1, officially switching back to the currency board system. The peg of the Hong Kong dollar to the U.S. dollar in 1983 took place in the context of Sino-British negotiations regarding the future of Hong Kong after 1997. Due to the lack of public confidence in the talks, on 24 September 1983, the Hong Kong dollar was devalued by 15% over 2 days to a historical low at HK$9.60 to US$1. Public panic set in and there were runs on foodstuffs, marking Black Saturday (1983). Amidst the monetary crisis, John Greenwood, an economist who was later dubbed the "architect of the linked exchange rate system" in Hong Kong, proposed to peg the Hong Kong dollar to the U.S. dollar with a return to the former currency board system. The proposal received support from two government officials within the Monetary Affairs Branch of the Hong Kong government, namely the Deputy Secretary for Monetary Affairs Tony Latter and the government economist Alan McLean as a practical way to restore confidence in the Hong Kong dollar. After discussions between London and Hong Kong, the Financial Secretary of Hong Kong John Bremridge announced that the Hong Kong dollar would be pegged to the U.S. dollar at a rate of HK$7.80 to US$1 in a currency board fashion on 17 October 1983.

When recalling the choice of rate, Tony Latter notes that a rate of HK$7.25 to HK$7.50 was considered a reasonable range in macroeconomic terms, given a rate against the U.S. dollar of around HK$6.60 before the crisis and a rate around HK$8.30 to HK$8.80 when the government's intention to change monetary regime was revealed in early October. In political terms, the government did not want to set the rate too weak so as to warrant international allegations of currency manipulation for competitive advantages, or too strong a rate so as to result in high interest rates and the eventual abandonment of the original exchange rate. HK$7.80 was finally selected in hopes of demonstrating that the situation had been properly stabilized and it was felt that the rate below HK$8.00 could achieve this purpose psychologically.

John Bremridge was once quoted saying that the rate was somewhat "a number off the air", but the most important thing was the restoration of public confidence in the Hong Kong dollar with the peg amidst the crisis. The solution in its current form was favored by government officials for reasons beyond monetary considerations. Financially, the currency peg was designed not to require the Bank of England to lend its reserves to maintain Hong Kong's currency peg. Politically, the currency board system demonstrated the autonomy London had given to Hong Kong in economic policymaking amidst British negotiations with China to grant Hong Kong's higher autonomy after 1997. As envisioned, the currency board monetary regime continues to function with the same pegged rate beyond the handover of sovereignty of Hong Kong to China in 1997.

=== Post-1997 period ===
The Basic Law of Hong Kong and the Sino-British Joint Declaration provides that Hong Kong retains full autonomy with respect to currency issuance. Currency in Hong Kong is issued by the government and three local banks (HSBC, Bank of China and Standard Chartered) under the supervision of the Hong Kong Monetary Authority, which was a semi-independent public body established in the early 1990s to regulate banks and manage exchange funds and now serves as the territory's de facto "central bank". Banknotes are printed by Hong Kong Note Printing Limited. A bank can issue a Hong Kong dollar only if it has the equivalent exchange in US dollars on deposit. The currency board system ensures that Hong Kong's entire monetary base is backed with US dollars at the linked exchange rate. The resources for the backing are kept in Hong Kong's exchange fund, which is among the largest official reserve in the world. Hong Kong also has huge deposits of US dollars, with official foreign currency reserves of US$361 billion as of March 2016.

In a speech addressing the issue of who determines the monetary policy in Hong Kong on 13 May 2002, Tony Latter, the Deputy Chief Executive of the Hong Kong Monetary Authority (HKMA), contended that the Financial Secretary together with the HKMA in the Hong Kong SAR Government were responsible for that. He acknowledged the heavy and direct influence of the Federal Reserve of the United States on Hong Kong's monetary policy under the currency peg, but argued that "It was Hong Kong's choice, and we do not require any permission from US to continue or discontinue it".

As of 18 May 2005, in addition to the lower guaranteed limit, a new upper guaranteed limit was set for the Hong Kong dollar at HK$7.75 to the US dollar. The lower limit has been lowered from 7.80 to 7.85 (by 100 pips per week from 23 May to 20 June 2005). The Hong Kong Monetary Authority indicated this move is to narrow the gap between the interest rates in Hong Kong and those of the United States. A further aim of allowing the Hong Kong dollar to trade in a range is to avoid the Hong Kong dollar being used as a proxy for speculative bets on a renminbi revaluation.

== Terminology ==
	Chinese	Yale (Cantonese)	Pinyin (Mandarin)	English
Formal currency name	港元 / 港幣	góng yùhn / góng bàih	gǎngyuán / gǎngbì	Hong Kong dollar
Formal unit name Formal name for ten cents Formal name for a cent	元 or 圓 毫 仙	yùhn hòuh sīn	yuán háo xiān	dollar none cent
Other unit names Other names for ten cents Other names for a cent	蚊 角 分	mān gok fān	wèn jiǎo fēn	n/a

In formal Cantonese, the 圓 or 元 (Cantonese Yale: yùhn) character is used to describe the Hong Kong dollar. In informal Cantonese, 蚊 (Cantonese Yale: mān) is used. The use of the character 蚊 (mān) originates from a change of tone of the name of the currency denomination used in China in imperial times 文 (Cantonese Yale: màhn), which was the chief currency denomination until the introduction of the yuan in the late 19th century.

The dollar is divided into 100 cents, with the character 仙 (Cantonese Yale: sīn, a transliteration of "cent") used on coins and in informal Cantonese. However, 仙 is now only used in the stock market, as it now is no longer issued as a coin or note due to its small value, and thus is no longer used in regular cash transactions. The amount of 10 cents is called 1 hou (毫) in Cantonese.

To express prices in informal Cantonese, for example HK$7.80, the phrase is 七個八 (Cantonese Yale: chāt go baat; lit. 'seven units eight'); in financial terms, where integer values in cents exist, e.g., HK$6.75, the phrase is 六個七毫半 (Cantonese Yale: luhk go chāt hòuh bun; lit. 'six units and seven dime half'; a denomination of five cents is normally expressed as "half", unless followed by another five, such as 55 cents when preceded by a dollar value); $7.08 is 七蚊零八仙 (Cantonese Yale: chāt mān lìhng baat sīn; lit. 'seven dollars zero eight cents').

=== Slang terms ===
In Hong Kong, the following slang terms are used to refer to various amounts of money:

Chinese name	Cantonese Yale Romanization	Value	Meaning
辰砂	sàhnsā	cents	Rarely used; lit. ground cinnabar (therefore small in size), which is used in Chinese medicine
斗零	dáulíng	5¢ coins	lit. dram; the weight of the coin, approximately 1.37 g; 5¢ coin is no longer in circulation
大餅	daaihbéng	$1	lit. big cracker; refers to its circular shape
草／兜／條	chóu/dāu/tíu	$10	lit. grass/bowl/stripe; slang terms
青蟹	chēngháaih	$10	lit. green crab; refers to the colour of the old style banknotes
花蟹／公仔紙	fāháaih / gōngjáijí	$10	lit. flowery crab, colourful paper; refers to the colour of the new style banknotes
䊆糈／嚿水	gauhséui	$100	lit. a lump of water; "water" stands for money in Cantonese
紅底／紅衫魚	hùhngdái / hùhngsāamyú	$100	lit. red underwear, red snapper; refers to the red colour of the notes
大牛	daaihngàuh	$500	lit. big bull; refers to a picture of a bull on the note in pre-war
金牛	gāmngàuh	$1,000	lit. golden bull; refers to the gold colour of the notes
棟	duhng	$1,000	lit. building; uncommon slang term
皮	pèih	$10,000	lit. skin; slang term
雞嘢	gāiyéh	$10,000	lit. chicken stuff; uncommon slang term, can also mean $1
餅	béng	$10,000	lit. cracker; uncommon slang term
球	kàuh	$1,000,000	lit. ball; slang term, usually used in buying stocks
碼	máh	$1,000,000,000	lit. yard

Some of these terms are also used by overseas Chinese to refer to equivalent denominations of their local currency. A slang term in English sometimes used for the Hong Kong dollar is "Honkie".

== Coins ==
In 1863, 1-mil (1/10-cent), 1-cent and 10-cent coins were introduced, followed in 1866 by 5-cent, 20-cent, half-dollar and 1-dollar coins. The 1-mil and 1-cent were struck in bronze, with the 1 mil a holed coin. The remaining coins were struck in silver. Production of the 1-mil ended in 1866, whilst that of the half-dollar and 1-dollar ceased in 1868, with only the half-dollar (now with the denomination given as 50 cents) resuming production in 1890. Production of all silver coins was suspended in 1905, only briefly resumed in 1932 and 1933 for the production of 5-cent coins.

In 1934, the last 1-cent coins were issued, but the last minting was 1941. These were not issued because the Japanese sank a ship carrying 1-cent coins bound for Hong Kong in the Second World War. The following year (1935), cupro-nickel 5 and 10 cents were introduced, replaced by nickel in 1937 and nickel-brass between 1948 and 1949. Copper-nickel 50 cents were issued in 1951 and first bore the name "fifty cents" in both Chinese and English, but these were changed to nickel-brass in 1977.

In 1960, cupro-nickel 1-dollar coins were introduced, and then reduced in size in 1978. They were followed in 1975 by nickel-brass 20 cents and cupro-nickel 2-dollar coins (both scallop shaped) and, in 1976, by decagonal, cupro-nickel 5-dollar coins, changed to a round thicker shape in 1980. The 5-cent coin was last issued in 1979, but last struck in 1988. In 1994, a bimetallic 10-dollar coin was introduced.

Starting in 1993, prior to the establishment of the HKSAR, coins with Queen Elizabeth II's portrait were gradually withdrawn from circulation. Most of the notes and coins in circulations feature Hong Kong's Bauhinia flower or other symbols. Coins with the Queen's portrait are still legal tender, but these are slowly being phased out. However, most still remain in circulation. Because the redesign was highly sensitive with regard to political and economic reasons, the designing process of the new coins could not be entrusted to an artist but was undertaken by Joseph Yam, Chief Executive of the Hong Kong Monetary Authority, himself, who found in the Bauhinia the requested "politically neutral design" and did a secret "scissors and paste job".

In early 1997, to commemorate Hong Kong's transfer of sovereignty from Britain to the PRC, the government issued a new commemorative coin set which depicted Chinese cultural themes and Hong Kong's landmarks and 19 and 97, marking the year 1997, on each side of the designs.

As of today, coins in denominations of HK$10, HK$5, HK$2, HK$1, 50 cents, 20 cents and 10 cents are issued by the Hong Kong Monetary Authority on behalf of the Government of Hong Kong.

Bauhinia Series (since 1993)
Value	Obverse	Reverse	Diameter	Mass	Edge	Composition	first year	issue date
10-cent	Bauhinia, "HONG KONG"	Value, year of minting	17.5 mm	1.85 g	plain	brass-plated steel	1993	1 January 1993
20-cent	Bauhinia, "HONG KONG"	Value, year of minting	18.0-19.0 mm	2.59 g	scalloped	brass-plated steel	1993	1 January 1993
50-cent	Bauhinia, "HONG KONG"	Value, year of minting	22.5 mm	4.92 g	milled	brass-plated steel	1993	1 January 1993
HK$1	Bauhinia, "HONG KONG"	Value, year of minting	25.5 mm	7.1 g	milled	cupronickel	1993	1 January 1993
HK$2	Bauhinia, "HONG KONG"	Value, year of minting	26.3-28.0 mm	8.41 g	scalloped	cupronickel	1993	1 January 1993
HK$5	Bauhinia, "HONG KONG"	Value, year of minting	27.0 mm	13.5 g	milled with lettered middle groove	cupronickel	1993	1 January 1993
HK$10	Bauhinia, "HONG KONG"	Value, year of minting	24.0 mm	11.0 g	alternate plain & milled	cupronickel ring, brass center	1993	1 January 1993

== Banknotes ==
Banknotes circulated by the three different note issuers, 2023
1. The Hongkong and Shanghai Banking Corporation (55.4%)
2. Bank of China (Hong Kong) (35.9%)
3. Standard Chartered Hong Kong (8.70%)

The issue of Hong Kong dollar notes is governed today by the Hong Kong Monetary Authority (HKMA), the governmental currency board of Hong Kong. Under licence from the HKMA, three commercial banks issue their own banknotes for general circulation in the region. They are Hongkong and Shanghai Banking Corporation Limited; the Bank of China (Hong Kong) Limited; and the Standard Chartered Bank (Hong Kong) Limited. Notes are also issued by the HKMA itself. In most countries of the world the issue of banknotes is handled exclusively by a single central bank or government. The arrangement in Hong Kong is unusual but not unique; a comparable system is used for the United Kingdom, where seven banks issue banknotes.

The three commercial banks (HSBC, Bank of China and Standard Chartered) each issue their own designs of banknotes in denominations of HK$20, HK$50, HK$100, HK$500 and HK$1,000, with all designs being similar to the other in the same denomination of banknote. The HK$10 banknote is issued solely by the Hong Kong Monetary Authority on behalf of the Government of Hong Kong, for a total of four banknote issuers in Hong Kong.

In 1845, the first private bank in Hong Kong, the Oriental Bank, was founded. However, banknotes were not produced until the 1860s, when the Oriental Bank, the Chartered Bank of India, Australia and China and the Hong Kong and Shanghai Banking Corporation began issuing notes. Denominations issued in the 1860s and 1870s included 1, 5, 10, 25, 50, 100 and 500 dollars. These notes were not accepted by the Treasury for payment of government dues and taxes, although they were accepted for use by merchants. 25 dollar notes did not survive beyond the end of the 19th century, whilst the 1-dollar notes (only produced by the HSBC) were issued until 1935.

Under the Currency Ordinance of 1935, banknotes in denominations of 5 dollars and above issued by the three authorised local banks, the Mercantile Bank of India, London and China, the Chartered Bank of India, Australia and China and the Hong Kong and Shanghai Banking Corporation, were all declared legal tender. The government took over production of 1 dollar notes. In 1941, the government introduced notes for 1 cent, 5 cents and 10 cents due to the difficulty of transporting coins to Hong Kong caused by the Second World War (a ship carrying 1941 1-cent coins was sunk, making this unissued coin very rare). Just before the Japanese occupation, an emergency issue of 1 dollar notes was made consisting of overprinted Bank of China 5 yuan notes.

In 1945, paper money production resumed essentially unaltered from before the war, with the government issuing 1 cent, 5 cents, 10 cents, and 1-dollar notes, and the three banks issuing 5, 10, 50, 100 and 500-dollar notes. 1-dollar notes were replaced by coins in 1960, with only the 1-cent note issued by the government after 1965.

In 1975, the HK$5 notes were replaced by coins, whilst HK$1,000 notes were introduced in 1977. The Mercantile Bank was absorbed by the HSBC in 1978 and ceased issuing notes. In 1985, HK$20 notes were introduced, whilst in 1993, HK$10 coins were introduced and the banks stopped issuing HK$10 notes. In 1994 the HKMA gave authority to the Bank of China to issue notes.

After a less-than-successful trial from 1994 to 2002 to move the HK$10 denomination from the banknote format (issued by the banks) to the coin format (government-issued), HK$10 notes are currently the only denomination issued by the HKMA, having acquired the note printing plant at Tai Po from the De La Rue Group of the UK on behalf of the government. These notes were printed in paper in 2002 and in polymer since 2007. All older HK$10 banknotes, although rare and being phased out, remain legal tender.

The latest series of banknotes was issued starting in 2018. Commemorative banknotes have also been issued celebrating the note-issuing banks' anniversaries as well as the Olympic Games held in Beijing in 2008 and 2022.

Banknotes - HK$10 and 2018 series
Value	HSBC issue	SCB issue	BOC issue	Theme
HK$10				Hong Kong Monetary Authority issue; abstract design
HK$20				Tea Culture
HK$50				Butterfly and Flowers
HK$100				Cantonese Opera
HK$500				Hexagonal Rock Columns (Hong Kong UNESCO Global Geopark)
HK$1,000				Skyline of Hong Kong (for BOC: Head in profile, digitalized brain, globe)

== Economics ==
=== Linked exchange rate system ===
HKD/USD exchange rate since 1990

Since 1983, Hong Kong's exchange rate regime, the linked exchange rate system, has been used for the Hong Kong dollar, pegging it to the United States dollar at a fixed rate of HK$7.80 = US$1. In this unique system, the Hong Kong Monetary Authority (HKMA) authorises the three note-issuing commercial banks to freely issue new banknotes provided that they deposit an equivalent value of United States dollars with the HKMA.

In practice, in the unique linked exchange rate system, the exchange rate of HK$7.80 = US$1 is strictly controlled by the Hong Kong Monetary Authority in the foreign exchange market by controlling supply and demand of Hong Kong dollars in order to influence the exchange rate being fixed. By this arrangement the HKMA guarantees to exchange United States dollars into Hong Kong dollars and vice versa, at the rate of 7.80. When the market rate is below 7.80, the banks will convert United States dollars for Hong Kong dollars from the HKMA, such that the supply of Hong Kong dollars will increase, and the market rate will climb back to 7.80. The same mechanism also works when the market rate is above 7.80, and the banks will convert Hong Kong dollars for United States dollars.

By this arrangement, the Hong Kong dollar is backed by one of the world's largest foreign exchange reserves, which is over 7 times the amount of money supplied in circulation or about 48% of Hong Kong dollars at the end of April 2016.

=== Renminbi peg debate ===
Following the internationalization of the renminbi in the late 2000s and the inclusion of the renminbi in special drawing rights, there has been some debates on pegging the Hong Kong dollar to the renminbi, instead of the United States dollar. Studies show that, if the Hong Kong dollar were to be re-pegged to the renminbi, Hong Kong would need over 2 trillion renminbi worth of assets to replace the HKMA's US$340 billion in foreign reserves as of 2015, which exceeds the amount of existing renminbi assets in Hong Kong's offshore market. Moreover, according to figures from the HKMA as of the end of 2014, renminbi deposits and certificates of deposits stood at 1.158 trillion renminbi, while outstanding renminbi bonds amounted to 381 billion and renminbi-denominated loans stood at 188 billion. Other studies show that while Hong Kong's financial and economic links are increasingly dominated by mainland China, and previous concerns about the monetary openness of China's capital account are slowly receding, if China continues to open its capital account, the peg could shift from United States dollar to renminbi.

However, in January 2016, the volatility in the renminbi and China's financial markets expanded to Hong Kong's markets and its currency. The renminbi offshore overnight borrowing rate, CNH HIBOR, soared to 66.8% on 12 January after the People's Bank of China (PBOC), the central bank of China, intervened in the effort of squeezing out renminbi short speculations by tightening liquidity at Hong Kong commercial banks. The PBOC's move at the offshore market, coupled with another plunge in Chinese stocks, has led to investors’ fears that the Hong Kong dollar may be de-pegged from the US dollar in the foreseeable future. In response to the market speculation, the Hong Kong Monetary Authority said on 27 January that they would protect the Hong Kong dollar's linked exchange rate regime. As Hong Kong's financial markets are highly impacted by mainland China, the renminbi exchange rate as well as China's equity market remain in a state of high volatility and continue to weigh on Hong Kong markets and the Hong Kong dollar. However, the greater influence remains the US Federal Reserve, as whenever it raises interest rates and sends the US dollar higher, the linked Hong Kong dollar must become more expensive than un-pegged currencies, including the Chinese yuan.

== Exchange rates ==
=== Current exchange rates ===
Current HKD exchange rates
From Google Finance:	AUD CAD CHF CNY EUR GBP JPY USD TWD KRW INR
From Yahoo! Finance:	AUD CAD CHF CNY EUR GBP JPY USD TWD KRW INR
From XE.com:	AUD CAD CHF CNY EUR GBP JPY USD TWD KRW INR
From OANDA:	AUD CAD CHF CNY EUR GBP JPY USD TWD KRW INR

=== Historical exchange rates ===
History of Hong Kong's Exchange Rate System
Period	Exchange rate regime	Features
1863–1935	Silver Standard	Silver dollars as legal tender
December 1935 – June 1972	Sterling exchange	Standard exchange rate: £1:HK$16 (December 1935 – November 1967); £1:HK$14.55 (November 1967 – June 1972)
July 1972 – November 1974	Fixed exchange rate against the US dollar	Exchange rate: US$1:HK$5.650 (June 1972 – February 1973); US$1:HK$5.085 (February 1973 – November 1974)
November 1974 – October 1983	Free floating	Exchange rates on selected days: US$1:HK$4.965 (25 November 1974); US$1:HK$9.600 (24 September 1983)
1983 – present	Linked exchange rate system	US$1:HK$7.80 (1983–1998); (for issue and redemption of Certificates of Indebtedness): US$1:HK$7.75 (1998–2005); (The HKMA undertook to convert the HK dollars in licensed banks’ clearing accounts maintained with the HKMA into US dollars at the fixed exchange rate of HK$7.75 to US$1. The rate moved to 7.80 by 0.0001 (1 pip) each calendar day starting from 1 April 1999 ending 12 August 2000.): US$1:HK$7.75–7.85 (May 2005 onwards); HKMA set up upper and lower guaranteed limit since 18 May 2005

Most traded currencies by value Currency distribution of global foreign exchange market turnover
Currency	ISO 4217 code	Proportion of daily volume		Change (2022–2025)
Currency	ISO 4217 code	April 2022	April 2025	Change (2022–2025)
United States dollar	USD	88.4%	89.2%	▲0.8pp
Euro	EUR	30.6%	28.9%	▼1.7pp
Japanese yen	JPY	16.7%	16.8%	▲0.1pp
Pound sterling	GBP	12.9%	10.2%	▼2.7pp
Renminbi	CNY	7.0%	8.5%	▲1.5pp
Swiss franc	CHF	5.2%	6.4%	▲1.2pp
Australian dollar	AUD	6.4%	6.1%	▼0.3pp
Canadian dollar	CAD	6.2%	5.8%	▼0.4pp
Hong Kong dollar	HKD	2.6%	3.8%	▲1.2pp
Singapore dollar	SGD	2.4%	2.4%	Steady
Indian rupee	INR	1.6%	1.9%	▲0.3pp
South Korean won	KRW	1.8%	1.8%	Steady
Swedish krona	SEK	2.2%	1.6%	▼0.6pp
Mexican peso	MXN	1.5%	1.6%	▲0.1pp
New Zealand dollar	NZD	1.7%	1.5%	▼0.2pp
Norwegian krone	NOK	1.7%	1.3%	▼0.4pp
New Taiwan dollar	TWD	1.1%	1.2%	▲0.1pp
Brazilian real	BRL	0.9%	0.9%	Steady
South African rand	ZAR	1.0%	0.8%	▼0.2pp
Polish złoty	PLN	0.7%	0.8%	▲0.1pp
Danish krone	DKK	0.7%	0.7%	Steady
Indonesian rupiah	IDR	0.4%	0.7%	▲0.3pp
Turkish lira	TRY	0.4%	0.5%	▲0.1pp
Thai baht	THB	0.4%	0.5%	▲0.1pp
Israeli new shekel	ILS	0.4%	0.4%	Steady
Hungarian forint	HUF	0.3%	0.4%	▲0.1pp
Czech koruna	CZK	0.4%	0.4%	Steady
Chilean peso	CLP	0.3%	0.3%	Steady
Philippine peso	PHP	0.2%	0.2%	Steady
Colombian peso	COP	0.2%	0.2%	Steady
Malaysian ringgit	MYR	0.2%	0.2%	Steady
UAE dirham	AED	0.4%	0.1%	▼0.3pp
Saudi riyal	SAR	0.2%	0.1%	▼0.1pp
Romanian leu	RON	0.1%	0.1%	Steady
Peruvian sol	PEN	0.1%	0.1%	Steady
Other currencies		2.6%	3.4%	▲0.8pp
Total (Note: The total sum is 200% because each currency trade is counted twice: once for the currency being bought and once for the currency being sold. The percentages above represent the proportion of all trades involving a given currency, regardless of which side of the transaction it is on.)		200.0%	200.0%	

== See also ==
- Economy of Hong Kong
- Hong Kong Monetary Authority
