= Hong Kong twenty five-dollar note =

Twenty five Dollars
(Hong Kong)
- Value: 25 Hong Kong dollars
- Width: various mm
- Height: various mm
- Security features: Watermark
- Material used: Cotton
- Years of printing: various years depending on bank

The Hong Kong twenty five dollar note was first issued from 1864 by the Oriental Bank Corporation, The Hongkong and Shanghai Banking Corporation in 1865, the Standard Chartered Bank (Hong Kong) from 1879 followed by the Mercantile Bank in 1889, though specimens of an earlier date exist. Specimens are known from the Asiatic Banking Corporation that existed between 1862 and 1866. This denomination was last printed in 1912 by the Mercantile Bank.
