= $10 =

There are many $10 banknotes, bills or coins, including:

- Australian ten-dollar note
- Canadian ten-dollar note
- Nicaraguan ten-cordoba note
- New Zealand ten-dollar note
- United States ten-dollar bill
- Hong Kong ten-dollar note
- Hong Kong ten-dollar coin
- One of the Namibian dollars
- One of the banknotes of Zimbabwe

Other currencies that issue $10 banknotes, bills or coins are:

- Bahamian dollar
- Barbadian dollar
- Belize dollar
- Bermudian dollar
- Brunei dollar
- Cayman Islands dollar
- Cook Islands dollar
- East Caribbean dollar
- Fijian dollar
- Guyanese dollar
- Jamaican dollar
- Liberian dollar
- Samoan tālā
- Singapore dollar
- Solomon Islands dollar
- Surinamese dollar
- New Taiwan dollar
- Trinidad and Tobago dollar
- Cape Verdean escudo
- Tongan paʻanga
- Argentine peso
- Chilean peso
- Colombian peso
- Cuban peso
- Dominican peso
- Mexican peso
- Uruguayan peso
- Brazilian real
