= $5 =

There are many $5 banknotes, bills or coins, including:

- Australian five-dollar note
- Canadian five-dollar note
- New Zealand five-dollar note
- United States five-dollar bill
- Hong Kong five-dollar coin
- Hong Kong five-dollar note

Other currencies that issue $5 banknotes, bills or coins are:

- Bahamian dollar
- Barbadian dollar
- Belize dollar
- Bermudian dollar
- Brunei dollar
- Cayman Islands dollar
- Cook Islands dollar
- East Caribbean dollar
- Fijian dollar
- Guyanese dollar
- Jamaican dollar
- Liberian dollar
- Namibian dollar
- New Zealand dollar
- Samoan tālā
- Singapore dollar
- Solomon Islands dollar
- Surinamese dollar
- New Taiwan dollar
- Trinidad and Tobago dollar
- Nicaraguan córdoba
- Cape Verdean escudo
- Tongan paʻanga
- Argentine peso
- Chilean peso
- Colombian peso
- Cuban peso
- Dominican peso
- Mexican peso
- Uruguayan peso
- Brazilian real

== See also ==
- "5 dols", a 2018 song by Christine and the Queens, simultaneously released in English as "5 Dollars"
