= Hong Kong five hundred-dollar note =

Five hundred Dollars
- Country: Hong Kong
- Value: 500 Hong Kong dollars
- Width: 158 mm
- Height: 79 mm
- Security features: Window, Watermark, Security thread, Registration device, Latent image, Optically Variable Ink, Iridescent image
- Material used: Cotton
- Years of printing: various years depending on bank

The Hong Kong five hundred dollar note was first issued in undated from the 1860s by the Oriental Bank Corporation, the Standard Chartered Bank (Hong Kong) but a confirmed date for this bank is 1879, followed by The Hong Kong and Shanghai Banking Corporation in 1877, the Mercantile Bank in 1948 and the Bank of China in 1994. The Specimens are known from the Agra and Masterman's Bank and the Asiatic Banking Corporation between 1862-66. The National Bank of China issued theirs in the 1890s. There was a continuous issue till the Second World War in different colours and dimensions, they were reissued from 1946. The Mercantile bank ceased issue of this denomination after 1959. There was a standardisation of size in 1979 when the Chartered Bank reduced the size to that similar to HSBC. The colour was made uniform in 2003 when brown for all banknotes was adopted.

In 2018, all three banks released new designs for the note featuring hexagonal rock columns found in the Hong Kong UNESCO Global Geopark.
