= Cash rounding =

Rounding debts to the lowest physical denomination

A "BetterAllRound" notice at a cash register in Ireland after the October 2015 introduction of 5-cent rounding

Cash rounding or Swedish rounding (New Zealand English) occurs when the minimum unit of account is smaller than the lowest physical denomination of currency. The amount payable for a cash transaction is rounded to the nearest multiple of the minimum currency unit available, whereas transactions paid in other ways are not rounded (for example electronic funds transfer such as with payment cards, or negotiable instruments such as cheques). Cash rounding typically occurs when low-denomination coins are removed from circulation owing to inflation. Cash rounding may be a compulsory legal requirement if such coins are no longer legal tender, or a voluntary practice where they remain in circulation but are scarce or impractical.

Cash rounding (Swedish: öresavrundning, lit. 'öre rounding') was introduced in Sweden in 1972 when 1 and 2 öre coins were withdrawn from circulation, and has continued to be applied at incremental levels as smaller denomination coins have been withdrawn. The current level of cash rounding in Sweden is to the closest whole krona, after the 50 öre coin was withdrawn in 2010. The Reserve Bank of New Zealand used the name "Swedish rounding" in 1990 when withdrawing their 1- and 2-cent coins. In Canada, cash rounding to the nearest nickel (5 cents) due to the elimination of the penny in 2013 is also called penny rounding. In the United States, businesses are permitted, but not required, to round to the nearest nickel when pennies are unavailable.

When small-value coins are withdrawn, an alternative to the implementation of cash rounding is instead to increase the minimum unit of account to the smallest remaining currency unit and to round all prices and bank accounts to this value. Whereas cash rounding is an ongoing process, this alternative is a one-time conversion. It was done, for example, when the British farthing was withdrawn in 1960.

== Practice ==
Rounding is applied to the total of a bill, not to the line items on the bill. Typically, the total is rounded to the nearest multiple of the smallest denomination, which may be higher or lower than the unrounded total. Where the unrounded total is an equal distance from two multiples, practice varies: merchants may be required or encouraged to round down rather than up, giving the benefit to the buyer. An equal distance is possible when the rounding interval is an even number.

The introduction of cash rounding is typically accompanied by publicity campaigns for awareness among both consumers and implementing merchants; smaller campaigns will accompany the extension of an existing rounding system to a higher rounding interval.

=== Rounding with 0.05 or 5 intervals ===
Country	Dates	Notes
Albania		One lek coins were last produced in 2013. Although they continue to circulate and are legal tender, cash transactions may be rounded to the nearest multiple of five lekë.
Argentina		Always rounded down. Due to high rates of inflation since the 2010s, low denominations are no longer produced and are quickly disappearing from circulation.
Australia	1992 onwards	1c and 2c coins last produced in 1991 and removed from circulation in 1992, though they remain redeemable at banks. Payments completed by cheque or electronic means are not usually rounded, although some point-of-sale systems may round all transactions regardless of tender.
The Bahamas	2021 onwards	One cent coins issued by the Central Bank of the Bahamas ceased to be legal tender starting in 2021. All cash transactions should be rounded to the nearest multiple of five cents.
Bahrain	1966 onwards	1 fils coins were last minted in 1966 and are currently no longer in circulation, so prices are rounded to the nearest 5 fils.
Belgium	2019 onwards	Starting 1 December 2019 cash payments (payable of at least 5 cents) must be rounded to the nearest 5 cents. 1 and 2-cent coins are still valid as means of payment.
Bosnia and Herzegovina	2006 onwards	The smallest coin issued is the 5 fening. 1- and 2- fening coins are never issued. So prices are automatically rounded to the nearest 5 fening upon the introduction of the coin in 2006.
Brazil	2005 onwards	1-centavo coins no longer produced as of November 2005. Retailers now generally round their prices to the next 5 or 10 centavos.
Canada	2013 onwards	Penny no longer produced as of 2012. After 4 February 2013 pennies no longer distributed by banks. Cash transactions are rounded to the nearest $0.05. Electronic transactions are still completed to $0.01.
CFP franc area (French Polynesia, New Caledonia, Wallis and Futuna)	2022 onwards	1- and 2-franc coins (along with the old coins) ceased to be legal tender on 30 November 2022 with the new coin series (which omits the 1 and 2 franc coins) circulating from September 2022. The rounding rule does not apply to non-cash transactions.
Croatia	2009 to 2023	1- and 2-lipa coins were legal tender, but rarely used; the two coins are mostly minted for annual mint sets. Most prices were rounded to the nearest 5 or 10 lipa. Upon the introduction of the euro, the kuna lost its status as a legal tender currency.
Estonia	2025 onwards	1 and 2-cent coins will remain legal tender.
Finland	1980 onwards	The 1-penni coin was phased out in 1980 and the 5-penni coin in 1990. When Finland introduced euro notes and coins in 2002, cash payments were rounded to the nearest five cents, however one- and two-cent coins remain legal tender. Finland has its own design for 1- and 2-euro cent coins for mint sets with the intention of issuing them as non-circulating coins.
Georgia	2019 onwards	1-tetri and 2-tetri coins lost legal tender status in 2021.
Hungary	2011 onwards	The centesimal subdivision of the Hungarian forint (the fillér) was discontinued in 1999, and is not used for transactions, but may appear in contexts where precision is needed, such as petrol prices. Cash rounding is done to the level of 5 Ft, which is also the smallest denominated coin available after a new set of coins was introduced in 2011. The 1-forint and 2-forint coins were withdrawn in 2008 and are no longer legal tender. Full precision to the forint level remains possible through bank transactions.
Ireland	2015 onwards	A National Payments Plan in April 2013 planned "to trial the use of a rounding convention in a pilot project in a mid-size Irish town", with the 1- and 2-cent coins no longer being minted for general circulation while remaining legal tender. The trial in Wexford was declared successful in June 2015 and rounding to the nearest 5 cents commenced on 28 October 2015. Compliance is voluntary and retailers must make exact charging upon request. One- and two-cent coins remain legal tender, and rounding does not apply to electronic non-cash payments. Those coins with the Irish designs are still minted for coin sets and other countries, such as when back in 2017, Portugal purchased 272 million Irish 1- and 2-euro cent coins to save costs on minting.
Israel	1991 to 2007	1-agora coins were removed from circulation on 1 April 1991. Transaction amounts could still be specified to the nearest agora. Cash purchase totals were rounded to the nearest 5 agorot. This system was in effect until 1 January 2008, when the 5 agorot coin was also removed from circulation.
Italy	1918 to 2002, 2018 onwards	1 and 2-centesimi coins were last minted in 1918 and demonetized in 1924. All coins smaller than 1 lira were demonetized in 1947. 1 and 2 lire coins were last issued for circulation in 1959, then prices were rounded to the nearest 5 lire, although 1 and 2 lire coins remained legal tender. In the early 1990s, 5, 10 and 20 lire started to disappear from circulation, but they remained legal tender, making the 50 lire the smallest commonly used coin, until being withdrawn upon introduction of the euro in 2002. Since 1 January 2018 the Italian Mint discontinued the issuance of 1- and 2-euro cent coins for general usage; when payment is made in cash, some sellers round up or down to the nearest multiple of five cents. As of 2022, many sellers still give and accept 1 and 2-cent coins, as there's still plenty of pre-2018 coins in circulation, and more recent coins issued in other Eurozone countries too. There are still a limited number of post-2018 coins minted, but those are only meant for annual coin sets and not for general circulation.
Kazakhstan		1- and 2-tenge coins are rarely used in Kazakhstan, and prices are normally rounded to the nearest 5 tenge.
Lithuania	From 1 May 2025	1 and 2-cent coins will remain legal tender.
Malaysia	2008 onwards	In 2007, Bank Negara announced the cessation of 1 sen coin production and was removed from circulation by 2011, although those coins remain legal tender. The Malaysia government announced the introduction of a rounding mechanism to the nearest multiple of 5 sen for over-the-counter payments to be fully implemented by 1 April 2008. The total amount of a bill which ends in 1, 2, 6 and 7 sen will be rounded down while the total bill which ends in 3, 4, 8 and 9 sen will be rounded up to the nearest multiple of 5 sen.
Mexico	1992 to 2002	5 centavo coins no longer produced as of 2002. Retailers now generally round their prices to the next 10 centavos.
Moldova	2017 onwards	Minting of the 1-ban coin was stopped in 2017 and has slowly been removed from circulation. The 5-bani coin is the smallest denomination currently found in circulation in Moldova.
Netherlands	1980 to 2002, 2004 onwards	In 1980 the production of the Dutch 1 cent coin (0.01 guilder) ceased and the coinage was demonetised in the same year (at that time no coins between 1 and 5-cent existed). After introduction of the Euro in 2002, the Netherlands used 1- and 2- euro cent coins (equivalent to about 2.2 and 4.4 Guilder cents) until 2004. In 2004 the Netherlands discontinued issue and use of 1- and 2- euro cent coins for general circulation. The Netherlands did so under pressure from retail businesses, which claimed that dealing with 1- and 2-cent coins was too expensive. After a successful experiment in the town of Woerden in May 2004, retailers in the whole of the Netherlands have been permitted to round cash transactions to the nearest five cents since September 2004. 1- and 2- euro cent coins are still minted, but mostly for annual coin sets as non-circulating coins.
New Zealand	1990 to 2006	From 1990 to 2006, the 1- and 2-cent coins were no longer legal tender, but 5-cent coins were. From 2006, the 5-cent coin was no longer legal tender.
Peru	2011 to 2019	The one-céntimo coin was removed from circulation on 1 May 2011. It remained in place until the removal of the five-céntimo coin in 2019.
Romania	2005 onwards	One ban coins (worth 100 old lei) are legal tender but rarely encountered in circulation. Rounding is done to the nearest five bani.
Singapore	2011 onwards	The one-cent coin is no longer in production but still legal tender. Always rounded down.
Slovakia	2022 onwards	The one- and two-euro cent coins were removed from general circulation from 1 July 2022, however those 2 coins are still minted for annual coin sets.
South Africa	2002 to 2012	Rounding is done to the nearest 5 cents, as by then, 1- and 2-cent coins had not been produced due to their minuscule value and inflation having devalued them.
Sweden	1972 to 1985	1- and 2-öre coins were phased out.
Switzerland	2007 onwards	The 1-centime/Rappen coin was still produced until 2006 and legal tender until 2007 although it had already fallen out of common use long before.
Trinidad and Tobago	2018 onwards	1¢ coins are no longer produced as of 2014. In 2018, they lost their status as legal tender.
Turkey		1, 5, 10 and 25 kuruş coins are still legal tender; despite seldom encountered.
United Arab Emirates		1, 5, and 10 fils coins are seldom encountered in everyday life.
United States		As of November 2025, pennies are no longer produced for circulation, but still circulate and remain legal tender. Businesses are permitted, but not required, to round when pennies are unavailable, either to the nearest 5 cents or in the customer's favor. Businesses low on pennies may require payment in exact change. From late 2025 to January 2026, many terminals did not accept pennies, causing a nationwide shortage. As of July 2026, 20 states have enacted legislation permitting businesses to round cash transactions when pennies are unavailable; Arizona is the only state with mandatory cash rounding when pennies are unavailable.
Vanuatu	2011 onwards	1 and 2 vatu coins (and other coins in the old coinage series) are still legal tender.
Vietnam		500 dong notes are uncommon but sometimes used. Prices are usually rounded to 1,000 dong, with small candies or pieces of chewing gum given as compensation for rounding up.

- Prices are rounded down to the nearest multiple of 5 cents for sales ending in 1¢ & 2¢ (rounded to 0¢) and 6¢ & 7¢ (rounded to 5¢).
- Prices are rounded up to the nearest multiple of 5 cents for sales ending in 3¢ & 4¢ (round to 5¢) and 8¢ & 9¢ (round to 10¢).
- Values ending in 0¢ or 5¢ remain unchanged.

=== Rounding with 0.10 or 10 intervals ===
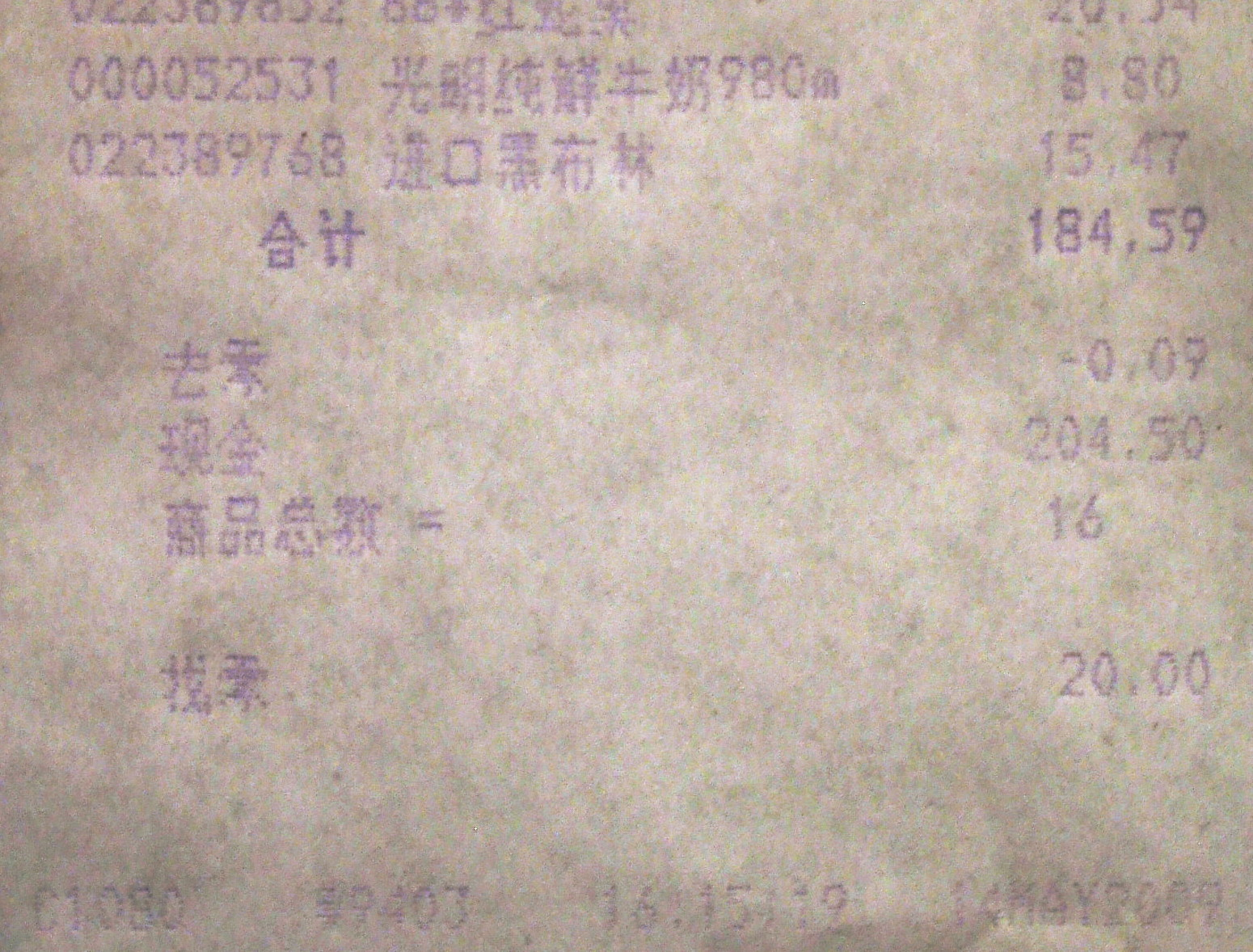
Chinese receipt showing the total being truncated by ¥0.09

This is currently used in New Zealand, which eliminated its 5-cent coin in 2006, and in Hong Kong, which eliminated its 5-cent coin in 1989 and 1 cent note in 1995. In practice only utility bills, petrol stations and banks still keep the cent.

All other businesses use only ten-cent intervals as follows:

- Prices are rounded down to the nearest 10 cents for sales ending in 1 to 4 cents.
- Prices are rounded up to the nearest 10 cents for sales ending in 5 to 9 cents.
- It is at the discretion of the business to decide if it will round 5¢ intervals up or down: the majority of retailers follow government advice and round it down.

In Sweden between 1985 and 1992, prices were rounded up for sales ending in 5 öre.

In China, coins smaller than 1 jiao (10 fen or ¥0.10) are now rare though still valid. As a result, many shops simply truncate their bills down to the next 1-jiao increment, giving the customer a discount of up to 9 fen; however, many other stores round sales to the nearest jiao values, and 5 fen is usually rounded up.

In Chile, the 1 and 5 peso coins were withdrawn on 1 November 2017 (but still legal tender), and rounding for cash transactions was implemented, prices are rounded down to the nearest 10 pesos if the value is $1–5, and rounded up if the value is $6–9. Most prices are already rounded to the nearest 10 pesos, and many small businesses round to 50 or 100 pesos due to the low value and availability of lower denominations.

In Israel, 5 agorot coins were removed from circulation on 1 January 2008, after 1 agora coins had already been removed in 1991. Transaction amounts can still be specified to the nearest agora. Cash purchase totals are rounded to the nearest 10 agorot. A 5 agorot total is rounded up to 10 agorot.

In South Korea, the 1- and 5-won coins are not used (but still legal tender). Prices are generally rounded to the nearest 10 won (though generally to the nearest 50 or 100 won in many stores apart from supermarkets), and cash payments are rounded to the same.

In Ukraine, from 1 October 2019, the 1-, 2- and 5-kopiyka coins were demonetized and withdrawn from circulation, with the 25-kopiyok coin softly withdrawn. From then all cash payments would be rounded to the nearest 10 kopiyok.

In Peru, the 1-céntimo coin was discontinued in 2011, and the 5-céntimo followed in 2019. Prices are now rounded to the nearest 10 céntimos.

In South Africa, the production of 1 and 2-cent coins was discontinued in 2002, followed by 5-cent coins in 2012, primarily due to inflation having devalued them, but they remain legal tender. Prices are nowadays rounded to the nearest 10 cents.

=== Rounding with 0.25 intervals ===
The system used in Denmark from 1989 to 2008 was the following:

- Sales ending in 1–12 øre are rounded to 0 øre.
- Sales ending in 13–37 øre are rounded to 25 øre.
- Sales ending in 38–62 øre are rounded to 50 øre.
- Sales ending in 63–87 øre are rounded to 75 øre.
- Sales ending in 88–99 øre rounded up to the next whole krone.

This system is used in the United Arab Emirates and Qatar, as the smallest coin in general circulation is the 25-fils/dirham coin, with the 1-, 5- and 10-fils/dirham coins being rarely encountered due to their negligible value.

Thailand also uses this system. Coins below 25 satang are not issued for general circulation.

=== Rounding with 0.50 intervals ===
The system used in Sweden from 1992 to 2010, in Norway from 1993 to 2012, and in Denmark since 1 October 2008 is the following:

- Sales ending in 1–24 öre/øre round down to 0 öre.
- Sales ending in 25–49 öre/øre round up to 50 öre.
- Sales ending in 51–74 öre/øre round down to 50 öre.
- Sales ending in 75–99 öre/øre round up to the next whole krona.

In practice, the proportion of transactions rounded upwards is greater, due to psychological pricing of items ending in 90–99 öre. Rounding is only done on the total sum of a purchase, which makes that effect smaller. In some shops, all prices are already rounded to the whole krone, so that no rounding takes place.

This system is also used in India after the 25-paisa coin and lower denominations were demonetised in 2011.

This system is also used in Nigeria since 2007, when all coins issued before 2006 were demonetised, leaving the 50 kobo coin the only circulating denomination below one naira.

=== Rounding with 1.00 intervals ===
The system used in Sweden since 30 September 2010 and used in Norway since 1 May 2012 when both countries withdrew their 50-öre/øre coins.

- Sales ending in 1–49 öre/øre round down to 0 öre/øre.
- Sales ending in 50–99 öre/øre round up to the next whole krona/krone.

Same system is used in Czechia, after the 10, 20 and 50 hellers were withdrawn from circulation in 2003 and 2008.

This is also the system similarly used in Jamaica since 15 February 2018, when all coins smaller than one dollar were demonetised. India also uses a similar system since 2019, as the 50-paisa coin is seldom seen in circulation due to its negligible value.

In Mexico there is a trend for most supermarkets to ask customers whether to round the total to the nearest 50¢ or the whole peso to automatically donate the difference to charities. Should the customer choose the latter option, this system is used.

== See also ==
- Charity rounding up
- Mil (currency)
- Penny debate in the United States
- Take a penny, leave a penny
