= Hong Kong one hundred-dollar note =

One hundred Dollars
(Hong Kong)
- Value: 100 Hong Kong dollars
- Width: 153 mm
- Height: 76.5 mm
- Security features: Window, Watermark, Security thread, Registration device, Latent image, Optically Variable Ink, Iridescent image
- Material used: Cotton
- Years of printing: various years depending on bank

The Hong Kong one hundred dollar note was first issued from 1858 from the Mercantile Bank, 1866 by the Oriental Bank Corporation, the Standard Chartered Bank (Hong Kong) from the 1860s but a confirmed date for this bank is 1879, followed by The Hongkong and Shanghai Banking Corporation in 1877. Specimens are known from the Agra and Masterman's Bank and the Asiatic Banking Corporation that existed between 1862–66 and from The National Bank of China in the 1890s. There was a continuous issue till the Second World War in different colours and dimensions, and this issue was resumed after the war in 1946, by the HSBC, Mercantile and Standard Chartered Banks. This was somewhat standardised in 1970 when the Chartered Bank changed the issue from brown to red, red was the colour of the other two issues. The Mercantile bank stopped issuing banknotes after 1974 and the Bank of China issued their version in 1994. The colour was made uniform when red for all banknotes was adopted.
