= Five dollar note =

A five dollar note or five dollar bill is a banknote denominated with a value of five dollars and represents a form of currency.

Examples of five-dollar notes include:

- Australian five-dollar note
- Canadian five-dollar note
- Hong Kong five-dollar note
- New Zealand five-dollar note
- United States five-dollar bill
