= Hong Kong fifty-dollar note =

Fifty Dollars
(Hong Kong)
- Value: 50 Hong Kong dollars
- Width: 148 mm
- Height: 74 mm
- Security features: Window, Watermark, Security thread, Registration device, Latent image, Optically Variable Ink, Iridescent image
- Material used: Cotton
- Years of printing: Various years depending on bank

The fifty-dollar note was first issued undated in the 1860s by the Oriental Bank Corporation, the Mercantile Bank, the Standard Chartered Bank (Hong Kong) but a confirmed date for this bank is 1879, followed by The Hongkong and Shanghai Banking Corporation in 1877. The National Bank of China also issued this denomination in the 1890s, but they are seldom seen. There was a continuous issue till the Second World War in different colours and dimensions, but they ceased to be printed between 1934 and 1941, depending on the bank. After the war no banks resumed to issue this denomination. They were resumed by The Hongkong and Shanghai Banking Corporation in 1968 the Standard Chartered Bank in 1970 as a blue note. This was then changed to purple in 1985 with a new smaller version and then to the current green issue in 2003. The Bank of China issued their version in 1994. The colour was made uniform when green for all banknotes was adopted.
