= Hundred dollar bill =

A hundred dollar bill or hundred dollar note is a banknote denominated with a value of hundred dollars and represents a form of currency.

Examples of hundred-dollar bills include:

- Australian one-hundred-dollar note
- Canadian one-hundred-dollar note
- Hong Kong one hundred-dollar note
- New Zealand one hundred-dollar note
- United States one-hundred-dollar bill
