= Hong Kong twenty-dollar note =

Twenty Dollars
- Country: Hong Kong
- Value: 20 Hong Kong dollars
- Width: 143 mm
- Height: 71.5 mm
- Security features: Window, Watermark, Security thread, Registration device, Latent image, Optically Variable Ink, Iridescent image
- Material used: Cotton
- Years of printing: SCB: from 1985 HSBC: from 1986 BOC: from 1994

The twenty-dollar note is one of the most common banknote denominations in Hong Kong. It was first issued by the Oriental Bank Corporation from 1866 to 1884, which are listed as extremely rare. Apart from this, the banknote was reintroduced in 1985 by the Standard Chartered Bank (Hong Kong) in green and yellow, followed by The Hongkong and Shanghai Banking Corporation in 1986 in black colours. The Bank of China issued their version in 1994 as a blue coloured banknote. These were standardised in 2004 when all three types of banknotes were changed to a blue colour.
