= $50 =

There are many $50 banknotes, bills, or coins, including:

- Australian fifty-dollar note
- Canadian fifty-dollar bill
- New Zealand fifty-dollar note
- United States fifty-dollar bill
- Nicaraguan fifty-cordoba note
- Hong Kong fifty-dollar note, One of the banknotes of the Hong Kong dollar
- One of the banknotes of Zimbabwe

Other currencies that issue $50 banknotes, bills, or coins are:

- Bahamian dollar
- Barbadian dollar
- Belize dollar
- Bermudian dollar
- Brunei dollar
- Cayman Islands dollar
- Cook Islands dollar
- East Caribbean dollar
- Fijian dollar
- Jamaican dollar
- Liberian dollar
- Namibian dollar
- Samoan tālā
- Singapore dollar
- Solomon Islands dollar
- Surinamese dollar
- New Taiwan dollar
- Trinidad and Tobago dollar
- Cape Verdean escudo
- Tongan paʻanga
- Argentine peso
- Chilean peso
- Colombian peso
- Cuban peso
- Dominican peso
- Mexican peso
- Uruguayan peso
- Brazilian real
