= Hong Kong five-dollar note =

Five Dollars
(Hong Kong)
- Value: 5 Hong Kong dollars
- Width: 142-143 mm
- Height: 79 mm
- Security features: Watermark
- Material used: Cotton
- Years of printing: various years depending on bank

Obverse
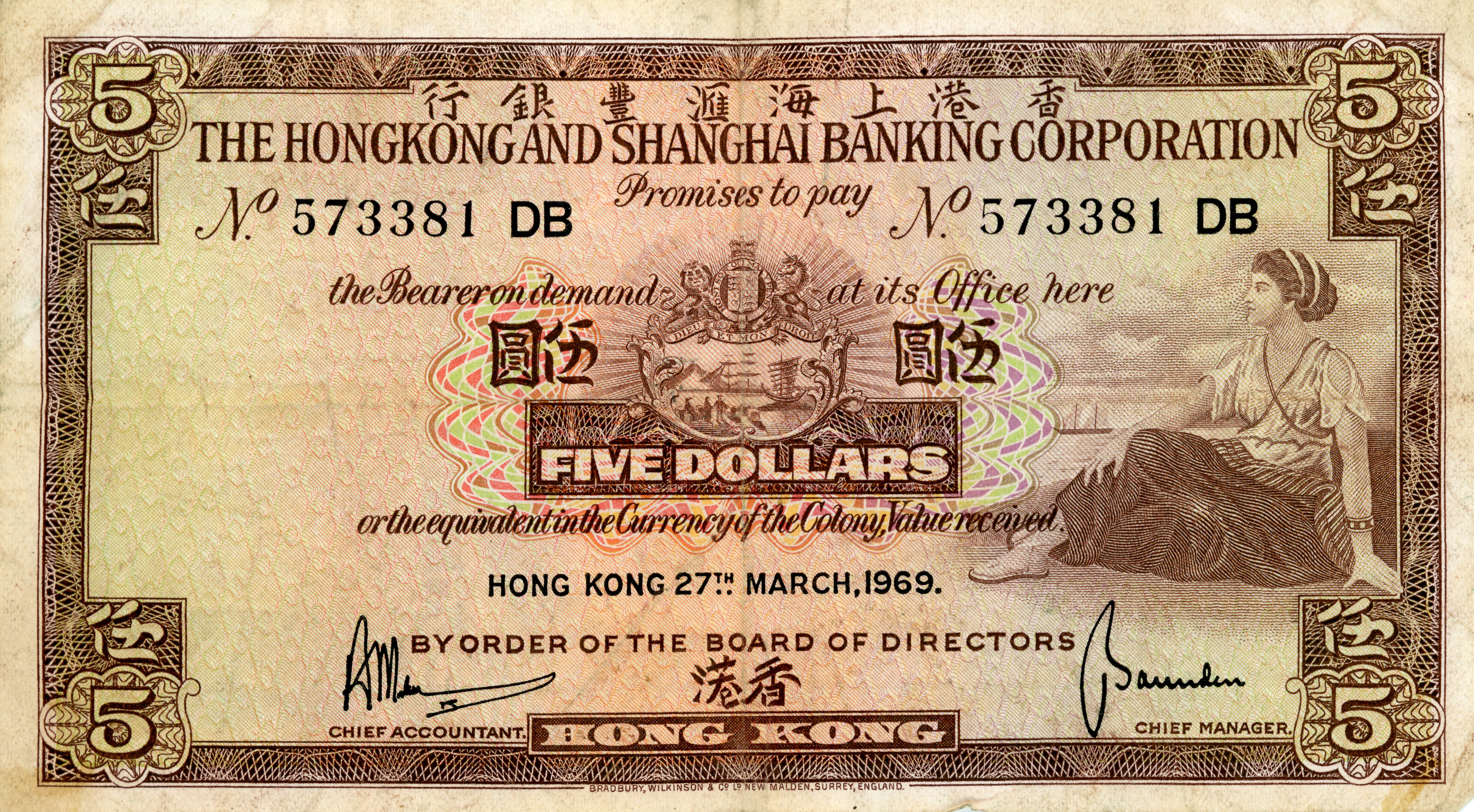

Reverse
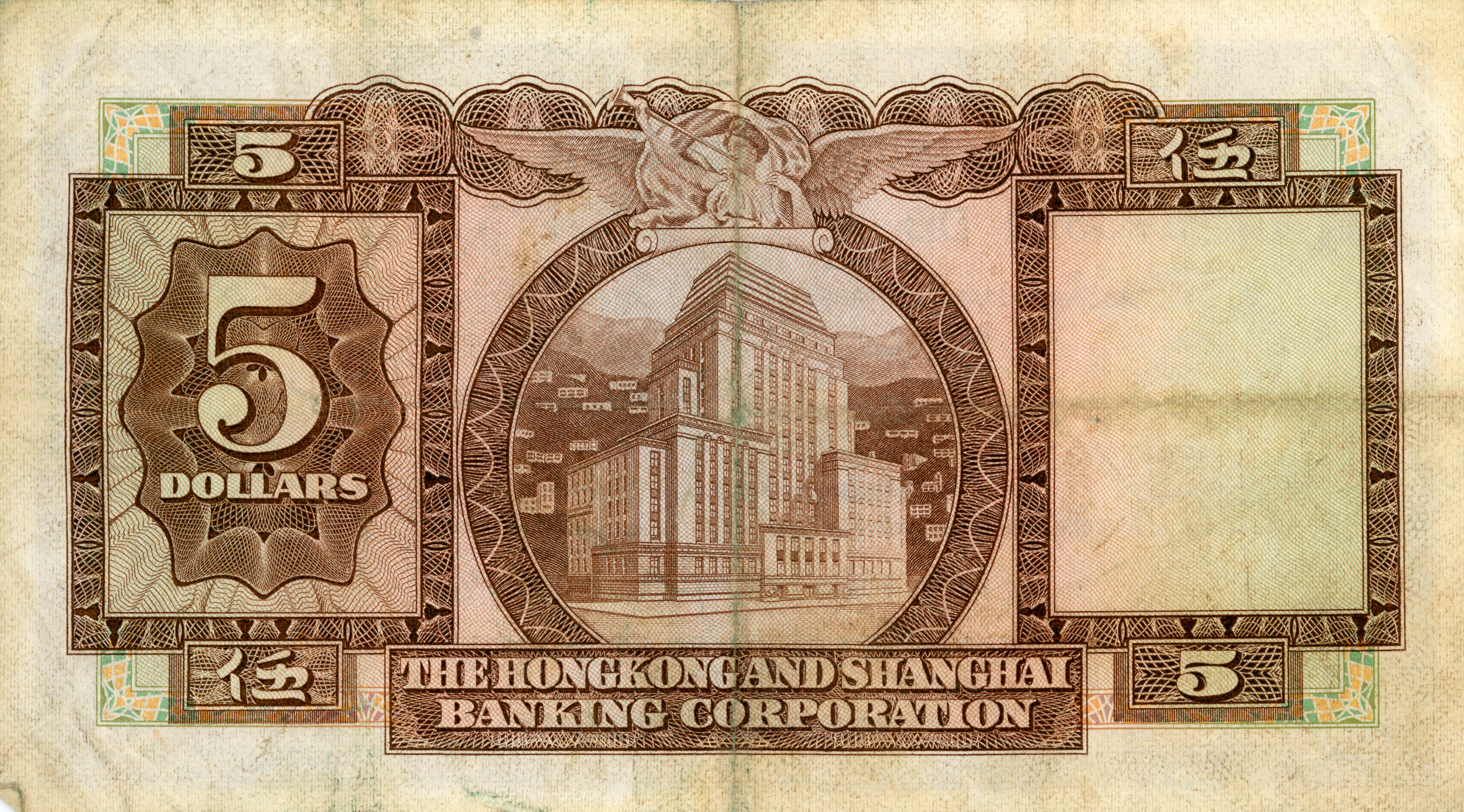

The five-dollar note was first issued in 1858 by the Mercantile Bank, 1865 by the Standard Chartered Bank (Hong Kong), 1866 by the Oriental Bank Corporation, 1897 by The Hongkong and Shanghai Banking Corporation, and 1894 by the National Bank of China. There was a continuous issue until the Second World War in different colours and dimensions, and this issue was resumed after the war in 1946, by the HSBC and Standard Chartered banks. The various banks' designs were somewhat standardised in 1970 when the Chartered Bank changed the issue from green to brown, as this was the colour of the HSBC issue. The Standard Charted Bank issued two colours from 1967 to 1970, a yellow and green note. These are described as being a yellow and green key in reference to the image of two keys on either side of the banknote. This denomination was replaced by a coin in 1976.

Preceded by none	Hong Kong five-dollar note 1858-1976	Succeeded by Hong Kong five-dollar coin
