= Hong Kong ten-cent note =

Banknote in Hong Kong introduced during World War II

Ten cent note
(Hong Kong)
- Value: 0.10 Hong Kong dollars
- Width: 103 mm
- Height: 52 mm
- Security features: None
- Material used: Cotton
- Years of printing: various years depending on signature

The ten cent banknote was a banknote issued in Hong Kong. They were issued by the government, and were initially released on 16 October 1941 and printed by Noronha and Company Limited, to provide small change because of a lack of coinage brought on by the Second World War, and an influx of people because of the Second Sino-Japanese War. The first issue was 55 by 95 mm, and the obverse was red with a serial number of seven numbers, with no prefix. This side was mostly in English, except for "Government of Hong Kong" which was also in Chinese. The reverse was blue and had the denomination in English and Chinese. After the Japanese take over of Hong Kong, the issue was replaced by the Japanese Military Yen.

In 1945, after the surrender of Japan, the dollar was re-established as the currency of Hong Kong, and the issue was recommenced, but different from the previous issue. It was a red one-sided note with a portrait of the British Monarch at that time, and had no serial numbers, however these notes ceased to be produced during the 1960s.
