= Hong Kong ten-dollar note =

Ten Dollars
- Country: Hong Kong
- Value: 10 Hong Kong dollars
- Width: 134 mm
- Height: 66 mm
- Security features: Window, Watermark, Intaglio printing, Registration device, Concealed denomination, Security thread, Fluorescent Fibers, Iridescent image
- Material used: Cotton and Polymer
- Years of printing: various years depending on bank: before 1995; HKSAR Government: 2002-03, 2005 (in paper); 2007, 2012, 2014, 2018, 2024 (in polymer)

Obverse
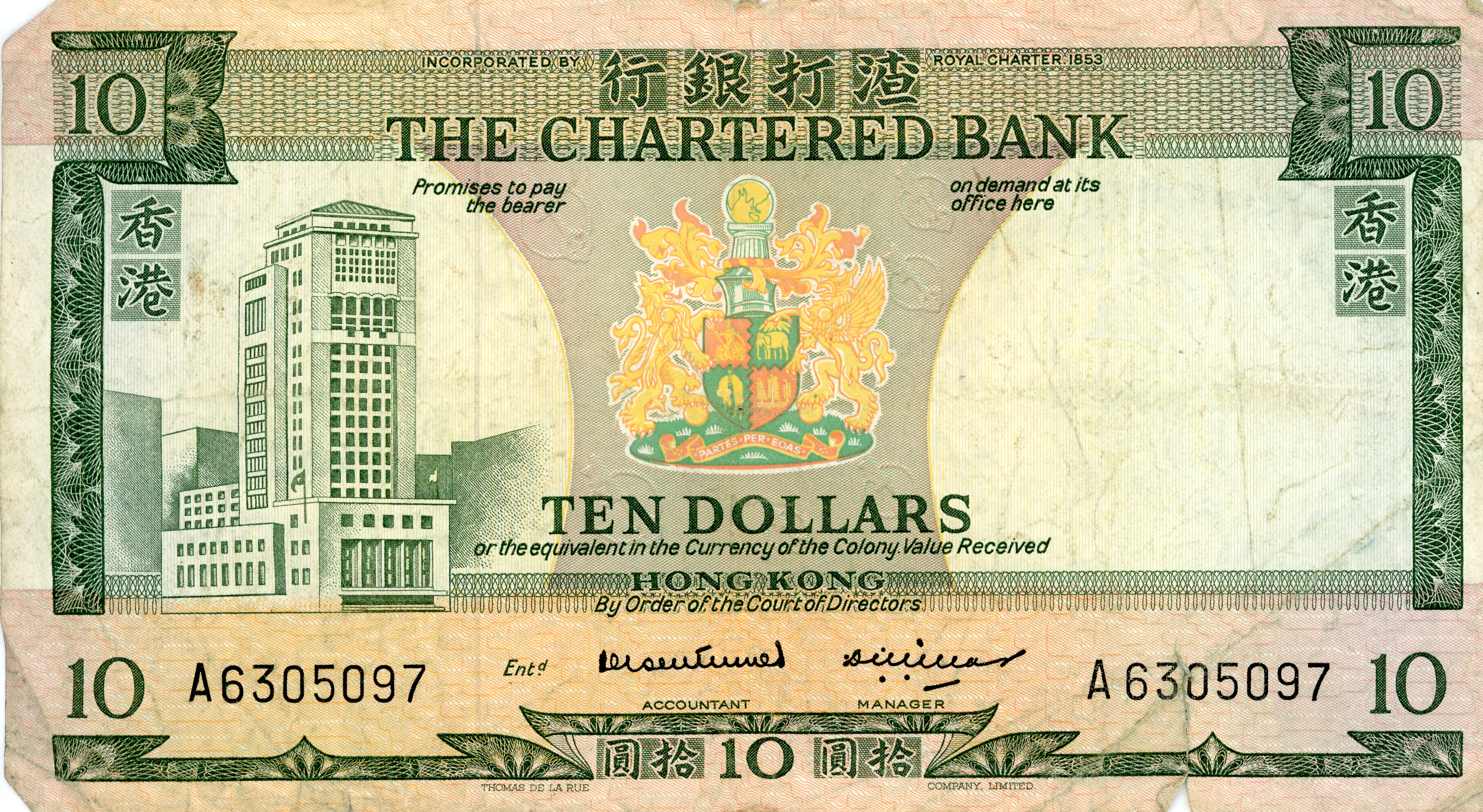

Reverse
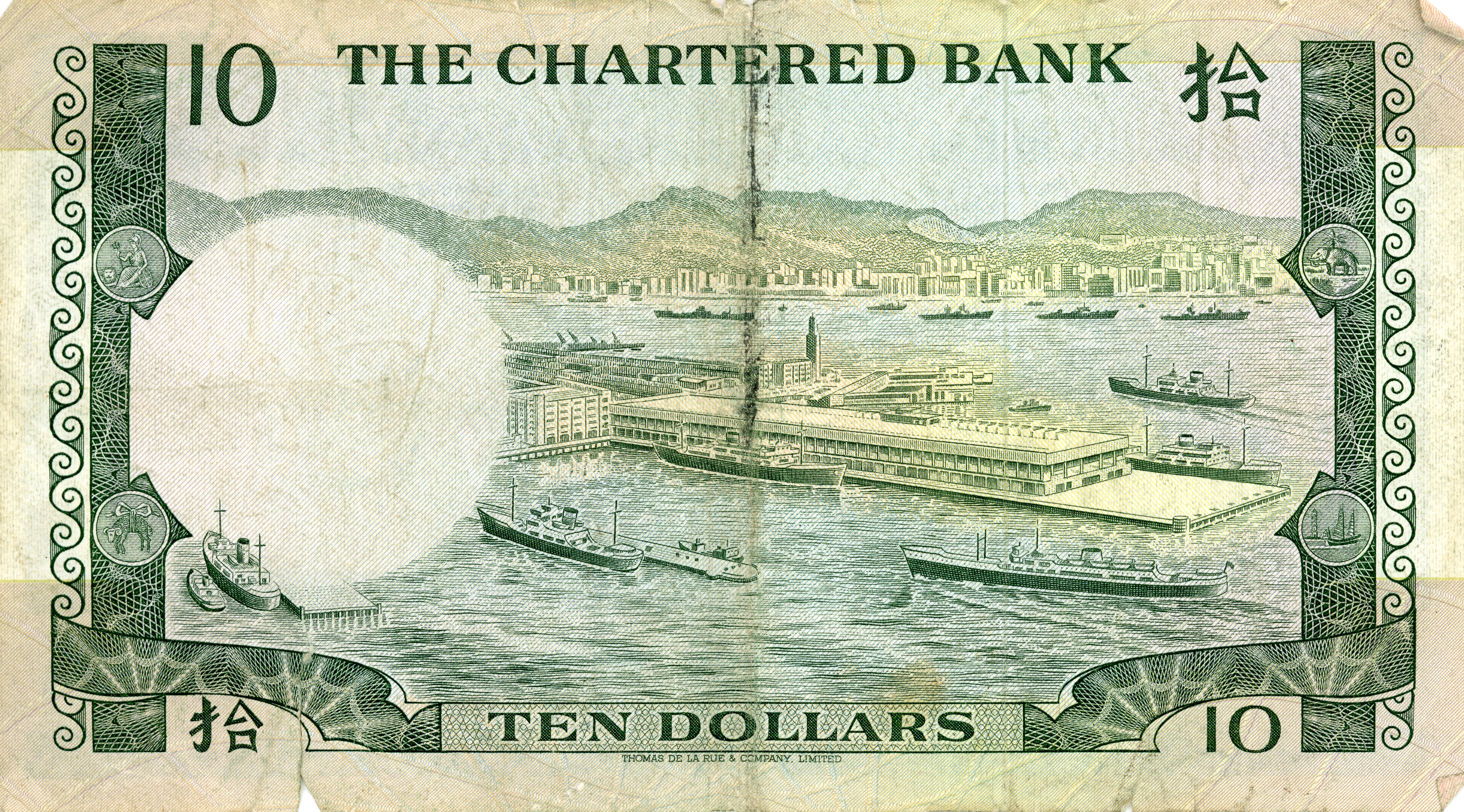

The ten-dollar note was first produced in 1868 by The Hongkong and Shanghai Banking Corporation with the formal adoption of a currency system just for Hong Kong. There had been a variety of the green coloured ten-dollar notes issued by several banks concurrently. These were all phased out with the introduction of the ten dollar coin in 1994.

Due to the high demand for the banknote, it was reissued under a new colour and design in 2002 by the Hong Kong Government. It was the first that the Government had issued any banknotes after the denomination of one-cent note in 1995 and the ten-dollar note remains the only circulating denomination that is issued by the Government rather than by authorised note-issuing banks.

The reissued notes are primarily purple in colour. The ten-dollar notes states "Legal Tender in Hong Kong" whereas all other notes on Hong Kong, issued by banks, states "Promises to pay the bearer on demand at its Office here ... By order of the Board of Directors". Starting from 2007, this note is made of polymer.

Preceded by none	Hong Kong ten-dollar note 1868-present	Succeeded by Hong Kong ten-dollar coin
