= Hong Kong ten-cent coin =

Lowest physical currency in Hong Kong

Ten cents
- Hong Kong
- Value: 0.10 HKD
- Mass: 1.85 g
- Diameter: 17.50 mm
- Thickness: 1.15 mm
- Edge: plain
- Composition: Nickel-brass
- Years of minting: 1863–1905, 1935–1939 and 1948–present
- Catalog number: –

Obverse
- Design: Bauhinia
- Designer: Joseph Yam
- Design date: 1992

Reverse
- Design: 10 with value in English and Chinese
- Designer: Joseph Yam
- Design date: 1992

The ten-cent coin is the lowest-denomination circulating coin of the Hong Kong dollar. With a diameter of 17.5 millimetres (0.69 in) and a mass of 1.85 grams (0.065 oz) it is also the smallest in size and weight. It is the oldest coin denomination to still be in circulation in Hong Kong. Since its first issue in 1863, there has only been one period (1942–1947) where the coin was not in use.

== History ==
Before the Second World War the coin was first made of .800 purity silver, with a weight of 2.82 grams (0.099 oz), thickness of 1.1 millimetres (0.043 in) and diameter of 17.50 millimetres (0.689 in) with a reeded edge. The first ten-cent coin, issued in 1863, featured the portrait of Queen Victoria on its obverse and was minted until the year of her death, 1901. Her successor, King Edward VII of the United Kingdom then featured on the obverse from 1902 to 1905, despite reigning until 1910. In the early 1900s during China's currency reform, in some provinces of China, such as Guangxi, some residents and retailers refused Chinese 10-cent coins, and requested instead the "kwaitau", or "ghost's head" coin, a euphemism for the Hong Kong 10-cent coin.

After a long period of no minting, the coin returned in 1935 and 1936 with King George V of the United Kingdom on its obverse. The dimensions remained the same although the coin's composition was changed to copper-nickel.

In 1937, the weight was changed to 4.54 grams (0.160 oz), diameter to 20.57 millimetres (0.810 in), thickness to 1.85 millimetres (0.073 in), and the composition to nickel as the portrait of King George VI of the United Kingdom was introduced to the obverse.

In 1948, a new coin was issued for this denomination: a nickel-brass coin 20.57 millimetres (0.810 in) in diameter, weighing 4.54 grams (0.160 oz) and with a thickness of 1.85 millimetres (0.073 in) and a plain edge. From 1948 to 1951, it bore the portrait of George VI on its obverse, without his title of Emperor of India, lost in 1947. In 1955, despite succeeding in 1952, the portrait of Queen Elizabeth II was first minted on the obverse. From 1937 onwards, the coin featured a reeded security edge; this changed to a reeded edge in 1971.

Because of its similarity in size and weight to the 50-cent piece, the ten-cent piece was redesigned with a plain edge from 1982. The portrait of Queen Elizabeth II by Arnold Machin, introduced to the coins of the pound sterling in 1968, was placed on the obverse. On 1 January 1984, the old ten-cent coin was demonetised. In 1985, the portrait of the Queen by Machin was replaced by the portrait sculpted by Raphael Maklouf, used until 1992 and the launch of Hong Kong coins without the portrait of a reigning British Monarch.

The shape and size has been maintained at launch of the bauhinia series in 1993. In 1997, a commemorative coin was issued for the hand over of Hong Kong to China. It featured a traditional Chinese junk sailing boat.

== Mintage ==
Mintmarks

- H = Heaton
- KN = King's Norton

Year	Mintage
1902	18,000,000
1903	25,000,000
1904	30,000,000
1905	33,487,000
1935	10,000,000
1936	5,000,000
1937	17,500,000
1938	7,500,000
1939H	5,000,000
1939KN	5,000,000
1948	30,000,000
1949	35,000,000
1950	20,000,000
1951	5,000,000
1955	10,000,000
1956	3,110,000
1956H	4,488,000
1956KN	2,500,000
1957H	5,250,000
1957KN	2,800,000
1958KN	10,000,000
1959H	20,000,000
1960	12,500,000
1960H	10,000,000
1961	20,000,000
1961H	5,000,000
1961KN	5,000,000
1963	27,000,000
1963H	3,000,000
1963KN	???
1964	9,000,000
1964H	21,000,000
1965	40,000,000
1965H	8,000,000
1967	10,000,000
1968H	15,000,000
1971H	22,000,000
1972KN	20,000,000
1973	2,250,000
1974	4,600,000
1975	44,840,000
1978	57,500,000
1979	101,500,000
1980	24,000,000 (Few pieces were released for circulation in 1980, but large numbers have found their way onto the market in subsequent years. About 3,500 are known to exist.)
1982	???
1983	110,016,000
1984	30,016,000
1985	34,016,000
1986	40,000,000
1987	???
1988	30,000,000 circulating. 20,000 proof.
1989	40,000,000
1990	???
1991	???
1992	24,000,000
1993	???
1994	???
1995	???
1996	???
1997	???
1997 (Establishment of the HKSAR)	Commemorative sailing junk. Unknown circulation. 97,000 proof.
2017	???
