= Hong Kong five-cent note =

Five cents
(Hong Kong)
- Value: 0.05 Hong Kong dollars
- Width: 85 mm
- Height: 48 mm
- Security features: None
- Material used: Cotton
- Years of printing: various years depending on signature

The Hong Kong five-cent note was issued by the government, initially released on 16 October 1941 and printed by Noronha and Company Limited to provide small change because of a lack of coinage brought on by the Second World War. The first issue was 48 by 85 mm; the obverse was green with serial numbers of seven numbers with no prefix. This side was mostly in English, except for "Government of Hong Kong" which was also in Chinese. The reverse was blue and the denomination in English and Chinese. After the Japanese take-over of Hong Kong, the issue was replaced by the Japanese military yen.

After the surrender of Japan in 1945, the dollar was reestablished as the currency, a green uniside note with the portrait of the British monarch, and containing no serial numbers was issued; these notes ceased to be issued after 1965.
