= Hong Kong two-dollar coin =

Third-highest denomination coin of the Hong Kong dollar

Two dollars
- Hong Kong
- Value: 2.00 HKD
- Mass: 8.41 g
- Diameter: 28/26.31 mm
- Thickness: 2.03 mm
- Edge: 12 scalloped plain
- Composition: Copper-nickel
- Years of minting: 1975, 78-90, 1992, 1993-95, 97-98, 2012-13
- Catalog number: KM#37, 60, 64, 76

Obverse
- Design: Bauhinia
- Designer: Joseph Yam
- Design date: 1992

Reverse
- Design: 2 with value in English and Chinese
- Designer: Joseph Yam
- Design date: 1992

The two-dollar coin is the third-highest denomination coin of the Hong Kong dollar. Since its introduction in 1976, it is one of two circulating coins to not be round (the twenty cent coin is also not round). The two dollar coin is a dodecagonal scallop in shape, and made of cupro-nickel.

It was issued in 1975, and thus became the highest denomination coin until the five dollar coin was introduced the next year. The coin was a new denomination to the Hong Kong monetary system, as suggested by the Coinage Review Committee.

The obverse featured Queen Elizabeth II from its introduction until being replaced with the Bauhinia flower in 1993, which featured on all Hong Kong coins minted since that year. In 1997, a commemorative coin was issued featuring the two saints of harmony, the He He brothers, to commemorate the handover of Hong Kong, from the United Kingdom to China.

== Mintage ==
Year	Mintage
1975	60,000,000
1978	504,000
1979	9,032,000
1980	30,000,000
1981	30,000,000
1982	30,000,000
1983	7,002,000
1984	22,002,000
1985	10,002,000
1986	15,000,000
1987	Unknown
1988	5,000,000 circulating. 20,000 proof.
1989	33,000,000
1990	Unknown
1991	Unknown
1992	14,000,000 (4,370,000 issued)
1993	Unknown
1994	Unknown
1995	Unknown
1997	He He Brothers commemorative. Unknown circulating. 97,000 proof.
1998	Unknown
2012	80,000,000
2013	Unknown
2015	Unknown
2017	Unknown
2019	Unknown
