= Charity rounding up =

Charity rounding up refers to the process of raising money for charity by using retail transactions at either a retail store's point of sale (POS) terminal or via an online website. Whenever a purchase is made using either a debit or credit card, the transaction is rounded up to the next decimal.

This original proof of concept was developed in 1999 when Wiremite Inc., a digital wallet company, was expanding the services available for a new terminal being introduced in retail outlets as well as online purchases. The charitable component was made possible due to the almost cost-free nature of the transaction and the bundling of the services available on a terminal.

== See also ==
- Cash rounding
