= Hong Kong one-cent coin =

One cent
- Hong Kong
- Value: 0.01 HKD
- Mass: 4.05 g
- Diameter: 21.5 mm
- Thickness: 1.30 mm
- Edge: Plain
- Composition: Bronze
- Years of minting: 1863 –1866, 1875-77, 1879-81, 1899-05, 1919, 1923-26, 1931, 1933-34, 1941
- Catalog number: -

Obverse
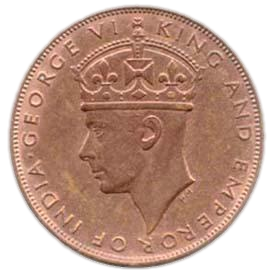
- Design: George VI of the United Kingdom, shown above

Reverse
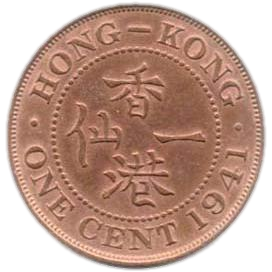
- Design: Hong Kong, value in English and Chinese and year of minting

The one-cent coin was the smallest-denomination coin of the Hong Kong dollar since 1866 until its replacement in 1941 by the one-cent note. During World War II the loss of coins dated 1941 along with their subsequent melting during the Japanese occupation of Hong Kong has resulted in the survival of no more than 100 coins.

== Design ==
Throughout its history the coin's initial design remained unchanged, constantly featured the text '香港一仙' surrounded by its translation 'HONG KONG ONE CENT' while its obverse displayed the current reigning British monarch. It total the coins has displayed four different monarchs: Queen Victoria, Edward VII and George V and George VI.

After a number of trial strikes the copper-based coin was released in 1863, weighing 7.5g and having a diameter of 27.8mm. In order to save money the coin was debased in 1902 switching from copper to bronze and further reduced in size twice under the reign of George V.

== Mintage Figures ==
Mintmarks

- H = Heaton

Year	Mintage
1902	5,000,000
1903	5,000,000
1904H	10,000,000
1905	2,500,000
1905H	12,500,000
1919H	2,500,000
1923	2,500,000
1924	5,000,000
1925	2,500,000
1926	2,500,000
1931	5,000,000
1933	6,500,000
1934	5,000,000
1941	5,000,000
