= Hong Kong five-cent coin =

Five cents
- British Hong Kong
- Value: 0.05 HKD
- Mass: 2.6 g
- Diameter: 16.51 mm
- Thickness: 1.73 mm
- Edge: Plain
- Composition: Silver, Nickel-brass
- Years of minting: 1866–1988
- Catalog number: –

Obverse
- Design: Queen Victoria to Queen Elizabeth II of the United Kingdom

Reverse
- Design: Hong Kong with value in English and Chinese

The five-cent coin was first issued as a silver coin of .800 fineness in 1866. It had a diameter of 15 mm, thickness of 0.80 mm, weighed 1.34 grams, and had a reeded edge. This coin was minted in silver until 1935, when its composition was changed to copper-nickel. It had an extensive mintage between 1866 and 1933, with some issued in 1932–33 with a plain edge. The coin was not minted in 1869–71, 1878, 1896, and 1906–1932. The following copper-nickel denomination was identical in all aspects except the composition and weight: it weighed 1.36 grams, 0.02 grams heavier than the previous coin. This was a one-year type as it was replaced with a pure nickel coin in 1937. This time, it had a diameter of 16.51 mm, was 1.73 mm thick, and weighed 2.59 grams. This was minted until 1941, with the last issue being scarce. Unlike the very rare 1941 Hong Kong one-cent coin these are available, although were never released to circulation because of the Japanese occupation.

For a period of eight years the denomination was replaced by banknotes and the Japanese military yen. When reintroduced in 1949, it had the same specifications as the last issue, but was minted in nickel-brass. Until 1970 the issue had a reeded security edge; afterwards, it was only reeded. This coin was issued in 1949–50, 1958, 1960, 1963–65, 1967, 1971–72, and 1977–80, with a non-circulating coin issued in 1988. The 1964H issue is scarce. On 1 January 1989, the coin ceased to be used as currency.

== Mintage ==
Mintmarks

- H = Heaton
- KN = King's Norton

Year	Mintage
1903	6,000,000
1904	8,000,000
1905	1,000,000
1905H	7,000,000
1932	3,000,000
1933	2,000,000
1935	1,000,000
1937	3,000,000
1938	3,000,000
1939H	3,090,000
1939KN	4,710,000
1941H	777,000
1941KN	1,075,000
1949	15,000,000
1950	20,400,000
1958H	5,000,000
1960	5,000,000
1963	7,000,000
1964H	???
1965	18,000,000
1965H	6,000,000
1967	10,000,000
1971KN	14,000,000
1971H	6,000,000
1972H	14,000,000
1977	6,000,000
1978	10,000,000
1979	4,000,000
1988	40,000 circulation. 20,000 proof.
