= Hong Kong ten-dollar coin =

Highest-valued current denomination of Hong Kong currency

Ten dollars
- Hong Kong
- Value: 10.00 HKD
- Mass: 11 g
- Diameter: 24mm outer rim, inner rim 15.6 mm
- Thickness: 3 mm
- Edge: intermited milled
- Composition: Copper-nickel outer ring and Nickel-brass center plug
- Years of minting: 1993 (proof) 1994-1997
- Catalog number: -

Obverse
- Design: Bauhinia
- Designer: Joseph Yam
- Design date: 1992

Reverse
- Design: 10 with value in English and Chinese
- Designer: Joseph Yam
- Design date: 1992

The ten-dollar coin is the highest-valued circulating coin issued in Hong Kong.

It circulates alongside the ten dollar banknote. It was first issued for circulation in 1994 to replace the $10 note, but the coin was not minted after 1997 and the Hong Kong Monetary Authority chose instead to reissue banknotes in 2002. A commemorative issue featuring the Tsing Ma Bridge was released in 1997 for the handover of Hong Kong to China. It was issued in uncirculated and proof sets. It is Hong Kong's only bi-metallic coin.

== Mintage ==
Year	Mintage
1993	??? circulating. 30,000 proof.
1994	??? circulating. 20,000 gold proof.
1995	??? circulating.
1996	800,000 circulating. (up to September 2014)
1997	Tsing Ma Bridge commemorative. No circulation. 97,000 proof.
	/// = has not been minted, ??? = unknown yet, --- = only minted for sets

Preceded by Hong Kong ten-dollar note	Hong Kong ten-dollar coin 1994-present	Succeeded by Hong Kong ten-dollar note
