= Hong Kong five-dollar coin =

Type of coins in Hong Kong

Five dollars
- Hong Kong
- Value: 5.00 HKD
- Mass: 13.5 g
- Diameter: 27 mm
- Thickness: 3.26 mm
- Edge: plain, lettered "Hong Kong Five Dollars" in English and Chinese
- Composition: Cupronickel
- Years of minting: 1976, 1978–79 (Decagon) 1980–90, 1993, 1995, 1997–98, 2012–13
- Catalog number: -

Obverse
- Design: Bauhinia
- Designer: Joseph Yam
- Design date: 1992

Reverse
- Design: 5 with value in English and Chinese
- Designer: Joseph Yam
- Design date: 1992

The five-dollar coin is the second-highest-denomination coin of the Hong Kong dollar. It replaced the five-dollar banknote in 1976.

It was first issued as a 10-sided coin in 1976, under British rule. The coin was also made of copper-nickel but weighed 10.76 grams, was 31 mm in diameter and 2.08 mm thick. The obverse featured Arnold Machin's portrait of Queen Elizabeth II and the inscription Queen Elizabeth II. Its reverse featured a crowned British lion and the year of minting, as well as the country's name and the coin's denomination in both English and Chinese.

In 1980, the current round coin was issued, being slightly smaller and heavier. This coin replaced the lion on the reverse with a number five, but retained Machin's portrait. In 1985, the portrait of the Queen was changed to the one by Raphael Maklouf, introduced to British coins in the same year.

In 1993, the image of the Queen on the obverse was replaced by a Bauhinia flower. Since that year, the flower features on all of Hong Kong's coins in circulation. The name of the country in both English and Chinese has been moved onto the obverse.

A commemorative issue was released in 1997 to commemorate the handover of Hong Kong to China from the United Kingdom. It had five bats of happiness on the reverse, surrounding the shou character of longevity. The date was split on each side of the character and the denomination moved to the top.

== Mintage ==
Year	Mintage
1976	30,000,000
1978	10,000,000
1979	12,000,000
1980	40,000,000
1981	20,000,000
1982	10,000,000
1983	4,000,000
1984	4,500,000
1985	6,000,000
1986	8,000,000
1987	???
1988	16,000,000 circulation. 20,000 proof.
1989	37,000,000 (10,040,000 issued)
1990	Unknown but never issued.
1993	10,000,000
1995	50.000
1997	Shou character commemorative. Unknown circulating. 97,000 proof.
1998	Unknown
2012	40,000,000
2013	???
2015	Unknown
2017	Unknown
	/// = has not been minted, ??? = unknown yet, --- = only minted for sets

Preceded by Hong Kong five-dollar note	Hong Kong five-dollar coin 1976–present	Succeeded by Present
