= Hong Kong twenty-cent coin =

Denomination of the Hong Kong dollar

Twenty cents
- Hong Kong
- Value: 0.20 HKD
- Mass: 2.59 g
- Diameter: 19/18.01 mm
- Thickness: 1.52 mm
- Edge: 12 scalloped plain
- Composition: Nickel and brass
- Years of minting: 1866 –1905, 1975 –present
- Catalog number: KM#7, 14, 36, 59, 67, 73

Obverse
- Design: Bauhinia
- Designer: Joseph Yam
- Design date: 1992

Reverse
- Design: 20 with value in English and Chinese
- Designer: Joseph Yam
- Design date: 1992

The twenty-cent coin is a coin of the Hong Kong dollar. It is the second-smallest denomination coin in Hong Kong. There have been two different periods of usage for a twenty-cent coin: the first, round twenty-cent was issued from 1866 to 1905, and the current scallop-shaped coin was introduced in 1975.

The first twenty-cent coin was minted from 1866 to 1905 but used until 1942. Before the Second World War the coin was first made of 80% silver, with a weight of 5.40 g, thickness of 1.80 mm and diameter of 22 mm. It contained a continuous reeded edge. From 1866 to 1898 it featured the portrait of Queen Victoria, although she reigned until 1901. Her title on the coin was not updated when she became Empress of India in 1875. Minting resumed in 1902 with a coin featuring King Edward VII of the United Kingdom, which was issued until 1905.

In 1975 a new coin was issued for the denomination. It was a scalloped shaped nickel-brass coin of 19 mm in diameter, weighing 2.59 g and with a thickness of 1.52 mm. The portrait of Queen Elizabeth II on the obverse was the one by Arnold Machin until 1983 and it was replaced in 1985 with one by Raphael Maklouf.

The coin has had the same denomination since 1975 but the design was changed in 1993, removing the effigy of Queen Elizabeth II and replacing it with the Bauhinia flower. In 1997 a commemorative coin was issued for the hand over of Hong Kong to China. It featured two butterfly kites with their tails knotted together.

== Mintage ==
| Year | Mintage |
|---|---|
| 1975 | 71,000,000 |
| 1976 | 42,000,000 |
| 1977 | Included above |
| 1978 | 86,000,000 |
| 1979 | 94,500,000 |
| 1980 | 65,000,000 |
| 1982 | 30,000,000 |
| 1983 | 15,000,000 |
| 1985 | 10,000,000 |
| 1988 | 40,000 circulating. 20,000 proof. |
| 1989 | 17,000,000 |
| 1990 | ??? |
| 1991 | ??? |
| 1992 | 131,000,000 |
| 1993 | ??? |
| 1994 | ??? |
| 1995 | ??? |
| 1997 | ??? |
| 1998 | ??? |
