= Hong Kong fifty-cent coin =

Denomination of the Hong Kong dollar

Fifty cents
- Hong Kong
- Value: 0.50 HKD
- Mass: 4.92 g
- Diameter: 22.5 mm
- Thickness: 1.72 mm
- Edge: Reeded
- Composition: Nickel-brass
- Years of minting: 1866 –1905, 1951 - present^{some years not minted, see text}
- Catalog number: -

Obverse
- Design: Bauhinia
- Designer: Joseph Yam
- Design date: 1992

Reverse
- Design: 50 with value in English and Chinese
- Designer: Joseph Yam
- Design date: 1992

The Hong Kong fifty-cent coin was first introduced as a .900 purity silver half dollar in 1866. These coins were 13.41 grams, with a diameter of 32 mm, thickness of 2 mm, and a reeded edge. The design was similar to the British trade dollar, except the image of Britannia was replaced by Queen Victoria. The dates of issue were 1866-67 with only 59,000 issued for both dates combined.

In 1890, a second issue of this coin was made, this time as a fifty-cent piece. The mintage years was from 1890–94 and 1902, 1904-05. The coin was reeded but reduced in size to 30.5 mm in diameter, but with an increase in weight to 13.48 grammes, but the thickness stayed the same at 2 mm. Metal composition was .800 silver.

No more of this denomination was minted until 1951 when a copper-nickel coin was issued. It was 23.5 mm in diameter, weighed 5.81 g and 2 mm in thickness. Until 1971, the reeding was with a security edge and from then onwards was just reeded. In 1977 a nickel-brass coin was issued which reduced the size of the coin. The bauhinia series, without the queen's portrait, was issued in 1993. In 1997 a commemorative coin was issued for the hand over of Hong Kong to China. It featured an ox.

Mintage years are as follows: 1951, 1958, 1960–61, 1963–68, 1970–75, 1977–80, 1990, 1993–95, 1997–98 and 2015.

== Mintage ==
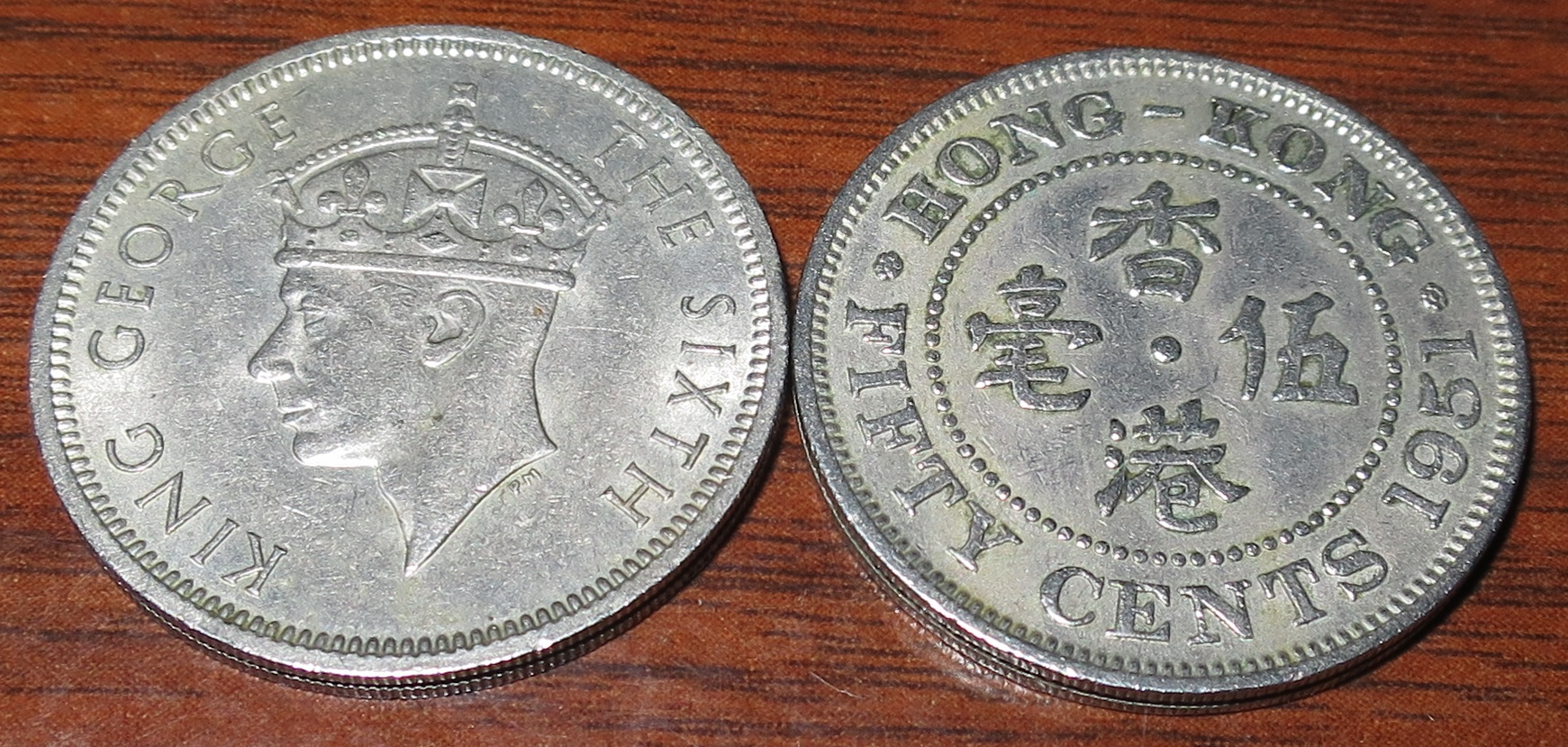
King George VI fifty-cent coin issued in 1951

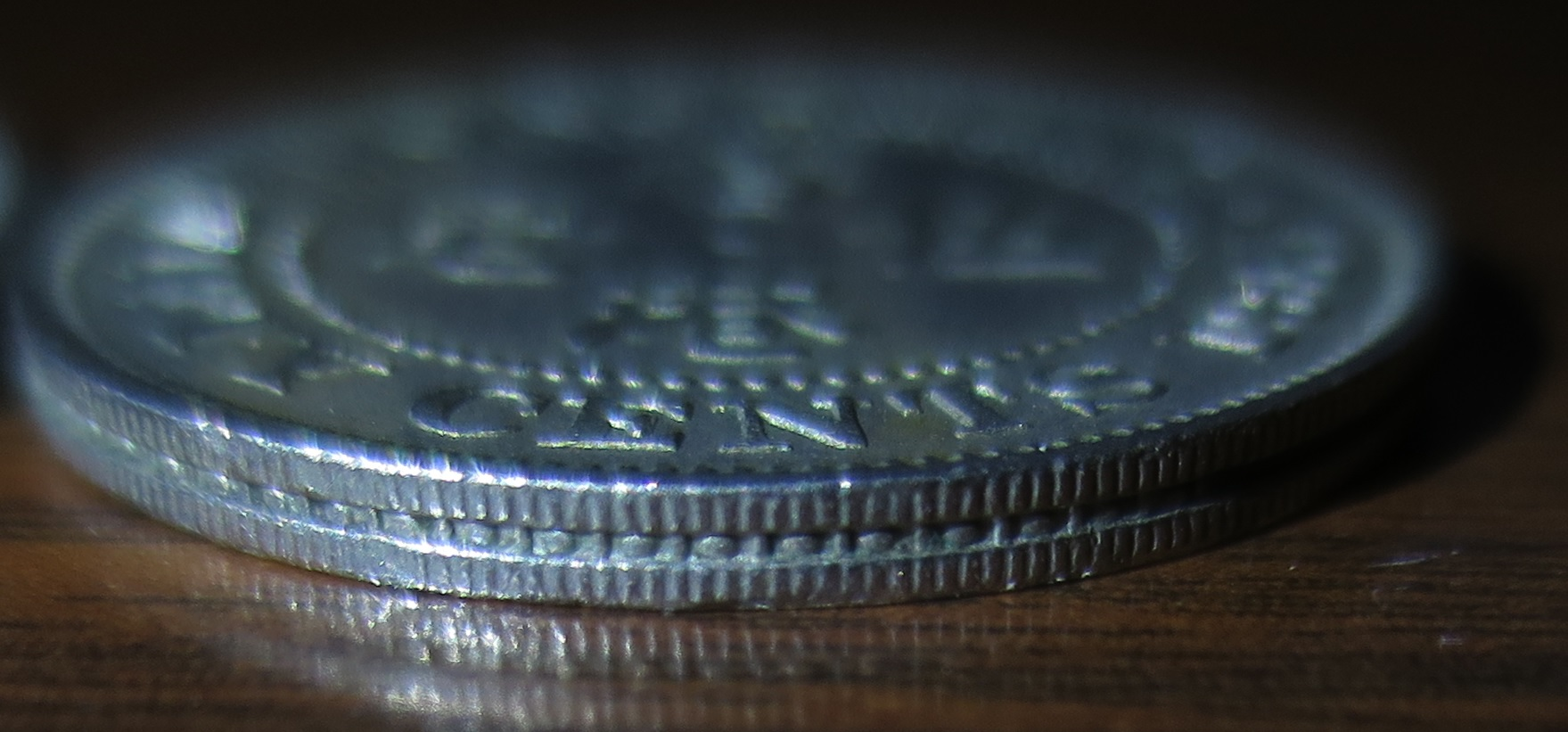
1951 Security Edge

Mintmarks

- H = Heaton
- KN = King's Norton

| Year | Mintage |
|---|---|
| 1951 | 15,000,000 |
| 1958H | 4,000,000 |
| 1960 | 4,000,000 |
| 1961 | 6,000,000 |
| 1963H | 10,000,000 |
| 1964 | 5,000,000 |
| 1965KN | 8,000,000 |
| 1966 | 5,000,000 |
| 1967 | 12,000,000 |
| 1968H | 12,000,000 |
| 1970H | 4,600,000 |
| 1971KN | ??? |
| 1972 | 30,000,000 |
| 1973 | 36,800,000 |
| 1974 | 6,000,000 |
| 1975 | 8,000,000 |
| 1977 | 60,001,000 |
| 1978 | 70,000,000 |
| 1979 | 60,640,000 |
| 1980 | 120,000,000 |
| 1988 | 40,000 circulating. 20,000 proof. |
| 1990 | 27,000,000 |
| 1993 | ??? |
| 1994 | ??? |
| 1995 | ??? |
| 1997 | Ox commemorative. ??? circulating. 97,000 proof. |
| 1997 | Unknown |
| 1998 | Unknown |
| 2015 | Unknown |
| 2017 | Unknown |
