= Hong Kong one-cent note =

One cent
- Country: Hong Kong
- Value: 0.01 Hong Kong dollar
- Width: 89 mm
- Height: 41 mm
- Security features: none
- Material used: Cotton
- Years of printing: 1941-1995

Obverse
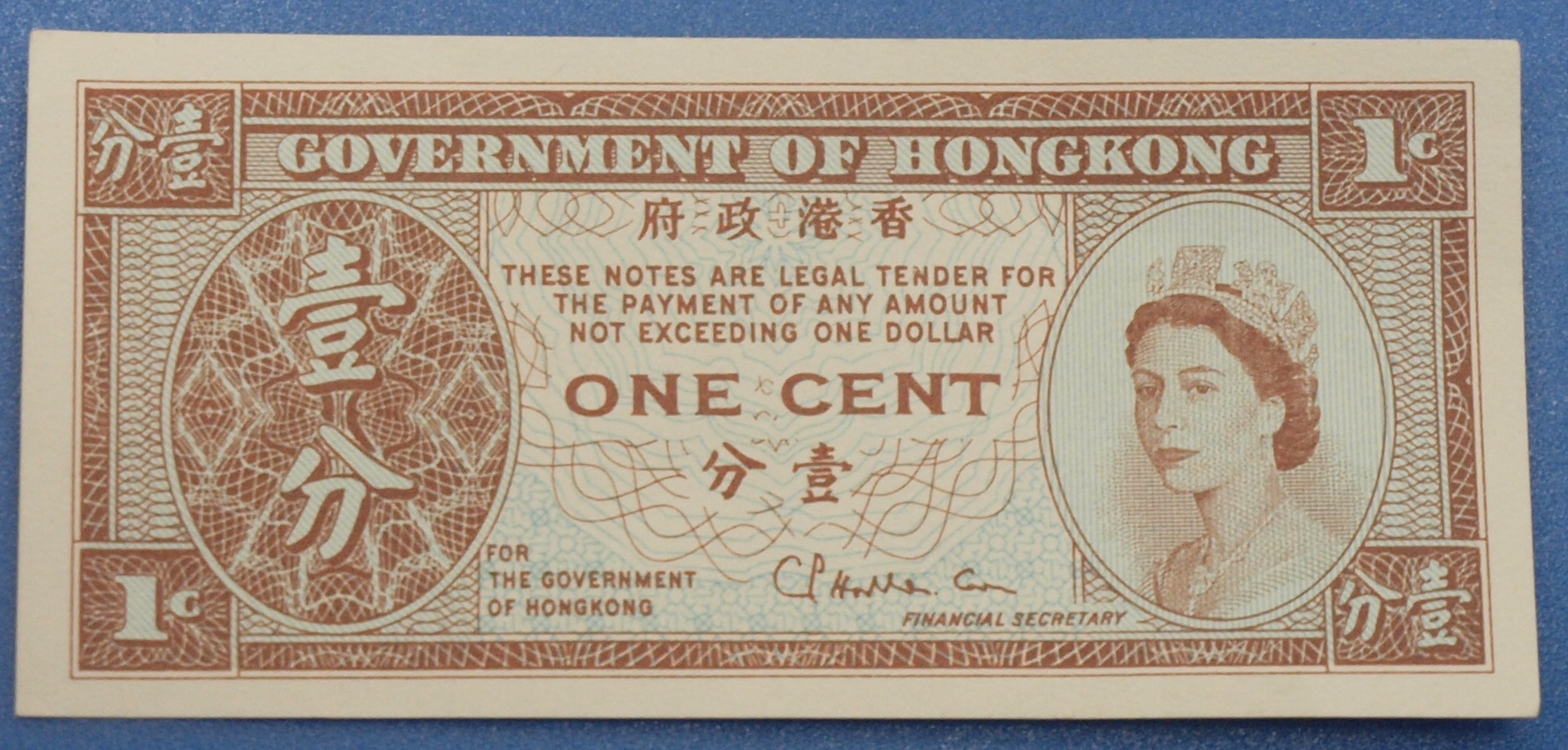

The one-cent banknote was the smallest denominated banknote issued in Hong Kong.

== History ==
They were issued by the government and were initially released on 30 May 1941 and printed by Noronha and Company Limited to provide small change because of a lack of coinage brought on by the Second World War. The first issue was 42 by 75 mm, the obverse was brown with a serial number of seven numbers with either no prefix or an A or B prefix. This side was mostly in English, except for "Government of Hong Kong" which was also in Chinese. The reverse was red and the denomination in English and Chinese. After the Japanese take over of Hong Kong the issue was replaced by the Japanese Military Yen.

After the surrender of Japan in 1945, the dollar was reestablished as the currency, a uni-side brown note with a portrait of the British monarch, and no serial numbers were ever found on the notes.

However, over the years of printing there have been five different signatures from five Government Financial Secretaries (namely Sir Henry Butters, Sir John Cowperthwaite, Sir Philip Haddon-Cave, Sir John Henry Bremridge, Sir Piers Jacobs and Sir Hamish Macleod) on the one-cent note. People can find their notes' year of issue on web pages littered around the Internet. These notes had five major issues: the first issued in 1941 bearing a portrait of King George VI, then a total of five issues bearing the picture of Queen Elizabeth II on the front, issued from 1961 to 1971, 1971–1981, 1981–1986, 1986–1992 and the final generation from 1992 until the demonetization of the one-cent note on 30 September 1995.
