= National Bank of China =

The National Bank of China (Chinese: 中華匯理銀行) was a bank in Hong Kong. It was founded in 1891 by a wealthy and influential Guangzhou family. It was the first banknote issuer financed by Chinese merchants and issued banknotes in denominations of HK$5 and HK$10. The bank closed in 1911.
