= Mercantile Bank of India, London and China =

UK business

Mercantile Bank Ltd
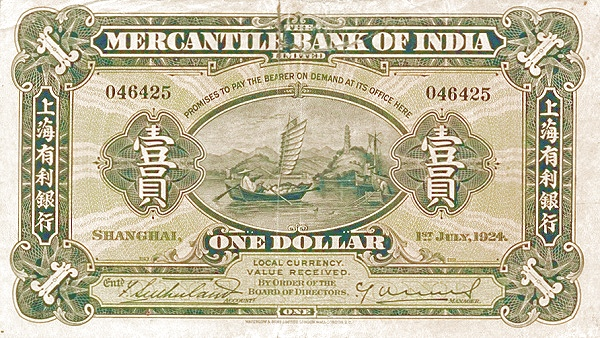
- A $1 banknote issued by the Shanghai branch of the Mercantile Bank
- Industry: Financial services
- Predecessor: Mercantile Bank of Bombay (1853); Mercantile Bank of India, London, and China (1857); Mercantile Bank of India, Ltd (1893)
- Founded: 1853
- Fate: Acquired by HSBC; 1959; Acquired by Citibank; 1984; Acquired by the Bank of Tokyo-Mitsubishi, Ltd. 1987
- Headquarters: Bombay (1853); London (1858)

The Mercantile Bank of India, London and China, later Mercantile Bank Ltd (Chinese: 有利銀行), was a British bank with business focus in the Far East. It was founded in Bombay in 1853 as the Mercantile Bank of Bombay; and later in 1857 was renamed to Mercantile Bank of India, London, and China with London as its headquarters.

By 1959, through a series of mergers and divisions, its name had been shortened to 'Mercantile Bank, Ltd', and was acquired by HSBC the same year. The bank was an issuer of Hong Kong bank notes until 1974.

== History ==
=== Early years: 1853–1900 ===
The historic bank started life in October 1853 as the Mercantile Bank of Bombay, taking the name of the city, Bombay, where it was founded. It expanded its operations to the Far East in November 1854 with the opening of an office in Shanghai. In 1857, the bank was granted a royal charter, and it established a presence in Hong Kong. The name was late changed to the Mercantile Bank of India, London and China, and it moved its headquarters to London in 1858.

It competed with the other great British banks of those times, such as the Oriental Bank Corporation, Hongkong and Shanghai Bank and Chartered Bank of India, Australia and China; involved in trade between India and China and other British possessions east of Suez. By 1860, its total assets reached the amount of US$21.7 million, a medium-sized bank by the standards of that time – a comparison shows that one of the leading Anglo-Indian banks, the Oriental Bank Corporation was about three times larger in terms of total assets. With the opening of the Suez Canal in 1869; and completion of Indo-European telegraph line from London to Calcutta, and its extension to China in 1871; most British banks (including Mercantile bank) were well placed to expand and develop its business.

The bank expanded its presence with branches across India, the Straits Settlements and Federated Malay States, and in Hong Kong and Shanghai. It issued banknotes in Penang, Singapore and Hong Kong. It became the issuer of Hong Kong banknotes for the first time from 1859 to 1892.

Trouble in 1893 meant it lost its charter, and was reconstituted as the Mercantile Bank of India Ltd.

=== Transition years: 1900–1959 ===
There was a re-consolidation of its operations at the beginning of the 20th century; and in 1912 it again became an issuer of Hong Kong banknotes, a privilege it retained until 1974.

During the Second World War, the Mercantile Bank had to close down several offices in the Far East, but it managed to re-open its offices after the war. The Hong Kong office re-opened in February 1946 and the Shanghai office in 1945, but was closed down its Shanghai operations in 1952 due to the Communist party rule. In 1952, total assets of the bank totalled US$205.5 million.

Logo of the Mercantile Bank in the 1970s

=== Amalgamation into HSBC and divestment: 1959–1987 ===
The bank was acquired in 1959 by The Hongkong and Shanghai Banking Corporation. By then its name had been shortened again, to the Mercantile Bank Ltd. The former office in Bombay now houses the HSBC Group's Head Office in India.

The Mercantile Bank continued to issue Hong Kong banknotes until the early 1970s. The signing of the historic Sino-British Joint Declaration in 1984, provided HSBC added impetus to expand overseas and sold the entity - Mercantile Bank, Ltd to Citibank the same year as part of its consolidation strategy. It was eventually sold to the Bank of Tokyo-Mitsubishi, Ltd. in 1987.

== See also ==
- Mercantile Bank (disambiguation)
- Banknotes of the Hong Kong dollar
- The Hongkong and Shanghai Banking Corporation
- Chartered Bank of India, Australia and China
- Oriental Bank Corporation
