= Oriental Bank Corporation =

British imperial bank founded in India

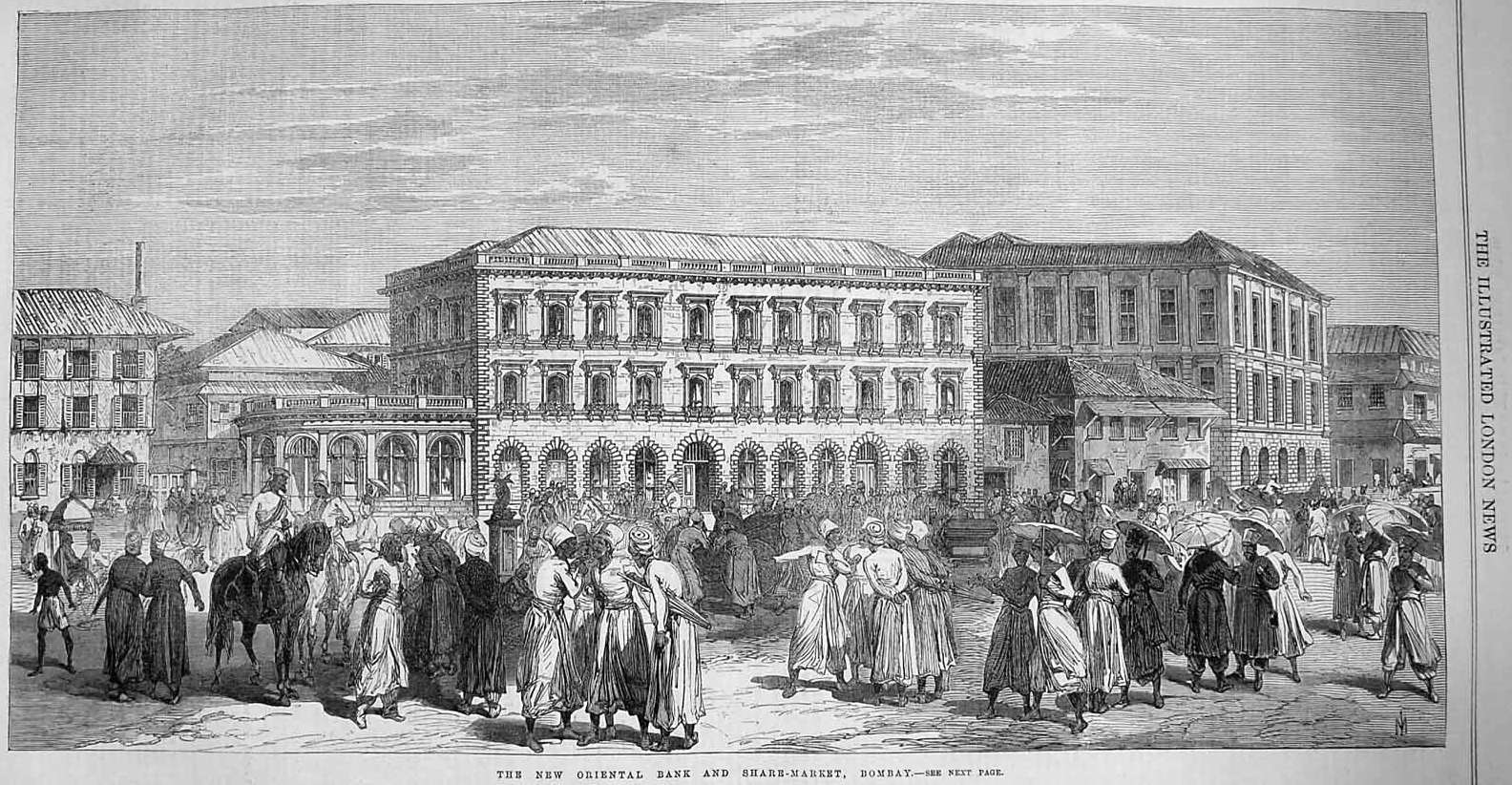
- The New Oriental Bank and Share Market, Bombay
- Formerly: Bank of Western India
- Company type: Private
- Industry: Banking
- Founded: Bombay, Bombay Presidency, British India (1842)
- Defunct: 1892
- Headquarters: London, United Kingdom of Great Britain and Ireland
- Areas served: Asia, Australia, New Zealand, South Africa, San Francisco

The Oriental Bank Corporation (Chinese: 東藩滙理銀行), or "OBC", was a British imperial bank founded in India in 1842 which grew to be prominent throughout the Far East. As an Exchange bank, the OBC was primarily concerned with the finance of trade and exchanges of different currencies. It was the first bank in Hong Kong and the first bank to issue banknotes in Hong Kong.

== History ==
The bank was established in 1842 in Bombay, India, as the Bank of Western India. The bank moved its headquarters from Bombay to London in 1845, and opened branches in Colombo (1843), Calcutta (1844), Shanghai (1845), Canton (1845), Singapore (1846), and Hong Kong (1846). The bank acquired the failing Bank of Ceylon in 1850, and obtained a royal charter for the merged institution under the name Oriental Bank Corporation in 1851. It was chartered in 1851 to allow competition with the East India Company's opium billing monopoly, which was unpopular in England at the time.

Expansion followed with additional branches opening in Mauritius, Madras (Chennai), Thalassery, Melbourne, Sydney, Auckland, Wellington, Port Elizabeth, Durban, Fuzhou (Foochow), Yokohama, Hiogo (Kobe), and San Francisco.

By the 1860s, the bank held a dominant position in India and China and was considered the “most powerful, oldest, and most prestigious Eastern exchange bank,” and “the doyen of Eastern exchange banking.”

From the 1870s, the bank's finances suffered greatly from bad loans to coffee plantations in Ceylon (now Sri Lanka), and to sugar plantations in Mauritius. On May 2, 1884, the bank suspended payment and it was subsequently liquidated in a Chancery proceeding. The majority of its branches and staff were sold to a new corporation, and its business was reconstituted as the New Oriental Bank Corporation. With growing competition from rivals, such as the Hongkong and Shanghai Banking Corporation and Chartered Bank of India, Australia, and China, the bank failed to survive and once again failed in 1892, becoming an early victim of the impending trouble of 1893.

== See also ==
- Banknotes of the Hong Kong dollar
- Panic of 1893
- Horatio Nelson Lay
