= Commonwealth banknote-issuing institutions =

Commonwealth banknote-issuing institutions also British Empire Paper Currency Issuers comprises a list of public, private, state-owned banks and other government bodies and Currency Boards who issued legal tender: banknotes.

== Africa ==
=== Biafra ===
- Bank of Biafra

=== Botswana ===
- Bank of Botswana

=== British Kaffraria ===
- British Kaffrarian Bank
- Kaffrarian Colonial Bank

=== British West Africa ===
- West African Currency Board

=== Bulawayo ===
- Bulawayo Administrator's Office

=== Cape of Good Hope ===
- African Banking Corporation
- Agricultural Bank of Queenstown
- The Bank of Africa Limited
- Bank of South Africa
- Beaufort Bank
- Cape Commercial Bank
- Cape of Good Hope Bank (First)
- Cape of Good Hope Bank (Second)
- Colesberg Bank
- Commercial Bank of Port Elizabeth
- Fort Beaufort and Victoria Bank
- Frontier Commercial and Agricultural Bank
- George Divisional Bank
- Graaf Reinet Bank
- London and South African Bank
- Malmesbury Agricultural and Commercial Bank
- Montagu Bank
- The National Bank of South Africa Limited
- The Oriental Bank Corporation
- Paarl Bank
- Port Elizabeth Bank
- Queenstown Bank
- Somerset East Bank
- South African Bank
- South African Central Bank
- The Standard Bank of British South Africa Limited
- The Standard Bank of South Africa Limited
- Stellenbosch Bank
- Stellenbosch District Bank
- Swellendam Bank
- Wellington Bank
- Western Province Bank
- Worcester Commercial Bank

=== Cape Province ===
- African Banking Corporation Limited
- The Bank of Africa Limited
- The National Bank of South Africa Limited
- The Standard Bank of South Africa Limited

=== East Africa ===
- East African Currency Board

=== Gambia ===
- Central Bank of The Gambia

=== Ghana ===
- Bank of Ghana

=== Kenya ===
- Central Bank of Kenya

=== Lagos Colony ===
- African Banking Corporation Limited
- The Bank of British West Africa Limited

=== Lesotho ===
- Central Bank of Lesotho
- Lesotho Monetary Authority

=== Mafeking ===
- Siege of Mafeking

=== Malawi ===
- Reserve Bank of Malawi

=== Mauritius ===
- Bank of Mauritius
- Colonial Bank of Mauritius Bourbon and Dependencies
- Mauritius Bank
- Mauritius Commercial Bank
- The Oriental Bank Corporation

=== Military Authority in Tripolitania ===
- Banknotes of the Military Authority in Tripolitania

=== Namibia ===
- Bank of Namibia
- Namibia Reserve Bank

=== Natal ===
- African Banking Corporation Limited
- The Bank of Africa Limited
- Colonial Bank of Natal
- Commercial and Agricultural Bank of Natal
- Durban Bank
- London and Natal Bank Limited
- Natal Bank Limited
- The Natal Bank Limited
- The National Bank of South Africa Limited
- The Oriental Bank Corporation
- The Standard Bank of British South Africa Limited
- The Standard Bank of South Africa Limited

=== New Griqualand ===
- The Government of New Griqualand

=== Nigeria ===
- Government of Nigeria
- Central Bank of Nigeria

=== Orange Free State ===
- African Banking Corporation Limited
- Bank of Africa Limited
- Bloemfontein Bank
- Fauresmith Bank
- The Government of the Orange Free State
- The National Bank of the Orange Free State Limited
- The National Bank of South Africa Limited
- The Standard Bank of South Africa Limited

=== Orange River Colony ===
- African Banking Corporation Limited
- Bank of Africa Limited
- The National Bank of the Orange River Colony Limited
- The National Bank of South Africa Limited
- The Standard Bank of South Africa Limited

=== Rhodesia ===
- African Banking Corporation Limited
- Bank of Africa Limited
- Barclays Bank (Dominion, Colonial and Overseas)
- The National Bank of South Africa Limited
- Reserve Bank of Rhodesia
- The Standard Bank of South Africa Limited

=== Rhodesia and Nyasaland ===
- Bank of Rhodesia and Nyasaland

=== Saint Helena ===
- Government of Saint Helena

=== Seychelles ===
- Central Bank of Seychelles
- Government of Seychelles
- Republic of Seychelles
- Seychelles Monetary Authority

=== Sierra Leone ===
- Bank of Sierra Leone
- Charles Heddle, Freetown
- Commercial Bank of Sierra Leone

=== Somaliland ===
- Bank of Somaliland

=== South Africa ===
- South African Reserve Bank
- Union of South Africa

=== South African Republic ===
- Cape Commercial Bank
- Cape of Good Hope Bank Limited
- The Government of the South African Republic
- The Netherlands Bank of South Africa
- The Netherlands Bank and Credit Union of South Africa Limited
- The Standard Bank of British South Africa Limited
- The Standard Bank of South Africa Limited

=== South Sudan ===
- The Bank of South Sudan

=== South West Africa ===
- Barclays Bank (Dominion, Colonial and Overseas)
- The Standard Bank of South Africa Limited
- Swakopmund Bookshop
- Volkskas Limited

=== Southern Rhodesia ===
- Central Africa Currency Board
- Southern Rhodesia Currency Board

=== Swaziland ===
- Central Bank of Swaziland
- Monetary Authority of Swaziland

=== Tanzania ===
- Bank of Tanzania

=== Transvaal ===
- African Banking Corporation
- Bank of Africa Limited
- Natal Bank Limited
- The National Bank of South Africa Limited
- The Netherlands Bank of South Africa
- The Standard Bank of South Africa Limited

=== Uganda ===
- Bank of Uganda

=== Upington ===
- The Upington Border Scouts

=== Zambia ===
- Bank of Zambia

=== Zanzibar ===
- The Government of Zanzibar

=== Zimbabwe ===
- Reserve Bank of Zimbabwe

== Americas ==
=== Anguilla ===
- Eastern Caribbean Currency Authority
- Eastern Caribbean Central Bank

=== Antigua ===
- Barclays Bank (Dominion, Colonial and Overseas)
- Colonial Bank
- Eastern Caribbean Currency Authority
- Royal Bank of Canada

=== Antigua and Barbuda ===
- Eastern Caribbean Central Bank

=== Bahamas ===
- The Bahamas Government
- The Bank of Nassau
- The Central Bank of The Bahamas
- The Public Treasury, Nassau

=== Barbados ===
- Barclays Bank (Dominion, Colonial and Overseas)
- The Canadian Bank of Commerce
- Central Bank of Barbados
- Colonial Bank
- The Government of Barbados
- The Royal Bank of Canada

=== Belize ===
- Central Bank of Belize
- The Monetary Authority of Belize

=== Bermuda ===
- The Bermuda Government
- The Bermuda Monetary Authority

=== British Caribbean Territories (Eastern Group) ===
- The Currency Board of the British Caribbean Territories (Eastern Group)

=== British Guiana ===
- The Government of British Guiana

=== British Honduras ===
- The Government of British Honduras

=== Canada ===
- Bank of Canada
- Canadian banknote issuers

=== Cayman Islands ===
- The Cayman Islands Monetary Authority

=== Demarary and Essequibo ===
See British Guiana, current day Guyana.

- Banknotes of Demarary and Essequibo

=== Dominica ===
- Barclays Bank (Dominion, Colonial and Overseas)
- Colonial Bank
- Eastern Caribbean Currency Authority
- Eastern Caribbean Central Bank
- The Royal Bank of Canada

=== East Caribbean Territories ===
- Eastern Caribbean Currency Authority (Issued as both a general issue and by each island).

=== Falkland Islands ===
- The Government of the Falkland Islands

=== Grenada ===
- Barclays Bank (Dominion, Colonial and Overseas)
- Colonial Bank
- Eastern Caribbean Currency Authority
- Eastern Caribbean Central Bank
- The Royal Bank of Canada

=== Guyana ===
- Bank of Guyana

=== Jamaica ===
- Bank of Jamaica (Trading bank)
- Bank of Jamaica (Central bank)
- The Bank of Nova Scotia
- Barclays Bank (Dominion, Colonial and Overseas)
- The Canadian Bank of Commerce
- Colonial Bank
- Island Treasury
- London and Colonial Bank Limited
- Planters' Bank
- The Royal Bank of Canada

=== Leeward Islands ===
- The Government of the Leeward Islands

=== Lower Canada ===
- Bank of Montreal

=== Montserrat ===
- Eastern Caribbean Currency Authority
- Eastern Caribbean Central Bank

=== Newfoundland ===
- The Bank of British North America
- Commercial Bank of Newfoundland suspended operations on 10 Dec 1894.
- The Government of Newfoundland
- Union Bank of Newfoundland suspended operations on 10 Dec 1894.

=== Ontario ===
- Bank of Toronto

=== Quebec ===
- Bank of Montreal

=== Saint Kitts (Saint Christopher) ===
- Barclays Bank (Dominion, Colonial and Overseas)
- Colonial Bank
- The Royal Bank of Canada

=== Saint Kitts and Nevis ===
- Eastern Caribbean Currency Authority
- Eastern Caribbean Central Bank

=== Saint Lucia ===
- Barclays Bank (Dominion, Colonial and Overseas)
- Colonial Bank
- Eastern Caribbean Currency Authority
- Eastern Caribbean Central Bank
- The Royal Bank of Canada

=== Saint Vincent and the Grenadines ===
- Barclays Bank (Dominion, Colonial and Overseas)
- Colonial Bank
- Eastern Caribbean Currency Authority
- Eastern Caribbean Central Bank

=== Trinidad ===
- Barclays Bank (Dominion, Colonial and Overseas)
- The Canadian Bank of Commerce
- Colonial Bank
- The Royal Bank of Canada
- The Union Bank of Halifax
- West India Bank

=== Trinidad and Tobago ===
- Central Bank of Trinidad and Tobago
- The Government of Trinidad and Tobago

== Asia and the Far East ==
=== Bangladesh ===
- Bangladesh Bank

=== Bengal Presidency ===
- Bank of Bengal
- Bank of Hindostan
- Bank of Calcutta
- Commercial Bank
- Union Bank

=== Bombay Presidency ===
- Bank of Bombay
- Bank of Western India

=== British North Borneo ===
- The British North Borneo Company
- The Darvel Bay (Borneo) Tobacco Plantations Limited

=== Brunei ===
- The Government of Brunei

=== Burma ===
- The Burma Currency Board
- The Government of India
- The Military Administration of Burma

=== Ceylon ===
- Central Bank of Ceylon
- The General Treasury
- The Government of Ceylon

=== Hong Kong ===
- The Agra and United Service Bank Limited
- The Asiatic Banking Corporation
- The Bank of China
- The Bank of Hindustan, China and Japan
- The Chartered Bank
- The Chartered Bank of India, Australia and China
- The Chartered Mercantile Bank of India, London and China
- The Government of Hongkong
- The HSBC
- The Mercantile Bank of India Limited
- The Mercantile Bank Limited
- The National Bank of China Limited
- The Oriental Bank Corporation
- The Standard Chartered Hong Kong

=== India ===
- Asiatic Bank
- The Government of Hyderabad
- The Government of India
- The Reserve Bank of India

=== Johore ===
- The Constantinople Estate

=== Madras Presidency ===
- Bank of Madras
- Madras Government Bank

=== Malaya ===
- Board of Commissioners of Currency, Malaya

=== Malaya and British Borneo ===
- Board of Commissioners of Currency, Malaya and British Borneo

=== Malaysia ===
- Central Bank of Malaysia

=== Maldives ===
- Maldives Monetary Authority

=== Pakistan ===
- The Government of Pakistan
- The State Bank of Pakistan

=== Palestine ===
- The Palestine Currency Board

=== Perak ===
- The Chartered Bank of India, Australia and China

=== Sarawak ===
- The Government of Sarawak

=== Selangor ===
- The Chartered Bank of India, Australia and China
- Tong Hing Loong

=== Singapore ===
- Board of Commissioners of Currency, Singapore
- Monetary Authority of Singapore

=== Sri Lanka ===
- Central Bank of Ceylon
- Central Bank of Sri Lanka

=== Straits Settlements ===
- The Asiatic Banking Corporation
- The Chartered Bank of India, Australia and China
- The Chartered Mercantile Bank of India, London and China
- The Government of the Straits Settlements
- The Hongkong and Shanghai Banking Corporation
- The New Oriental Bank Corporation Limited
- North Western Bank of India
- The Union Bank of Calcutta

== Australia ==
- Commonwealth Bank of Australia
- Reserve Bank of Australia
- Hutt River Province Principality

=== Tasmania ===
- Van Diemen's Land

== New Zealand ==
- Bank of Aotearoa
- Bank of Auckland
- Bank of Australasia
- Bank of New South Wales
- Bank of New Zealand
- Bank of Otago
- Colonial Bank of Issue
- Colonial Bank of New Zealand
- Commercial Bank of Australia
- Commercial Bank of New Zealand
- National Bank of New Zealand
- New Zealand Banking Company
- Oriental Bank Corporation
- Otago Banking Company
- Union Bank of Australia

=== Chatham Islands ===
- Chatham Islands Note Corporation

== Europe ==
=== Alderney ===
- Alderney Commercial Bank

=== Cyprus ===
- Central Bank of Cyprus
- The Government of Cyprus
- Republic of Cyprus

=== Gibraltar ===
- Government of Gibraltar

=== Guernsey ===
- The Guernsey Banking Company
- The Guernsey Banking Company Limited
- Guernsey Commercial Banking Company
- Guernsey Commercial Banking Company Limited
- The Southern District Banking Company
- The States of Guernsey

=== Ionian Islands ===
- Ionian Bank

=== Ireland ===
- Central Bank of Ireland
- Currency Commission Ireland
- Currency Commission Irish Free State
- The Munster and Leinster Bank Limited
- Ulster Bank Ltd

=== Isle of Man ===
- Castle Rushen
- Douglas and Isle of Man Bank (Dumbell's)
- Douglas and Isle of Man Bank (Holmes')
- Dumbell's Banking Company Limited
- Martins Bank Limited
- Isle of Man Government

=== Jersey ===
- Bible Christian Church
- Bible Christian Society
- The Esplanade
- International Bank
- Jersey Agricultural Association, Trinity Bank
- Jersey Mercantile Union Bank
- Masonic Temple Company Limited
- Parish of Saint Brelade
- Parish of Saint Peter
- Parish of Trinity
- Saint Clement's Parish Bank
- Saint John's Bank
- Saint Martin's Parish Bank
- Saint Mary's Parochial Bank
- Saint Peter's Parochial Bank
- Saint Peter's Value Road
- Saint Saviour's Bank
- The States of Jersey
- Town and Parish of Saint Helier
- Town Vingtaine of Saint Helier
- Vingtaine du Mont au Prêtre (see Vingtaine de Haut du Mont au Prêtre, Vingtaine de Bas du Mont au Prêtre)
- Wesleyan Methodist Country Chapels Bank

=== Limerick ===
- Limerick Soviet

=== Malta ===
- The Anglo-Egyptian Banking Company Limited
- Anglo-Maltese Bank
- Bank of Malta
- The Central Bank of Malta
- The Government of Malta

=== United Kingdom ===
- British Armed Forces
- British Military Authority

==== England and Wales ====
- Bank of England
- The Bewdley Bank
- The Black Sheep Company of Wales Limited
- The Chief Treasury of Wales Limited

==== Scotland ====
- Bank of Scotland
- The Royal Bank of Scotland
- Clydesdale Bank
- The British Linen Bank
- The Commercial Bank of Scotland
- The National Bank of Scotland

==== Northern Ireland ====
- Bank of Ireland
- First Trust Bank
- Northern Bank
- Ulster Bank
- The Provincial Bank of Ireland
- The Belfast Banking Company

== Pacific Islands ==
=== British Solomon Islands Protectorate ===
- The Government of the British Solomon Islands Protectorate

=== Fiji ===
- Bank of New South Wales
- Bank of New Zealand
- Central Monetary Authority
- Currency Board of Fiji
- Decimal Currency Board
- Fiji Banking and Commercial Company
- Government of Fiji
- Reserve Bank of Fiji

=== Gilbert and Ellice Islands ===
- The Government of the Gilbert and Ellice Islands

=== New Hebrides ===
- Banque de l'Indochine
- Overseas Institution of Issue

=== Papua ===
- Bank of New South Wales

=== Papua New Guinea ===
- Bank of Papua New Guinea

=== Riviera Principality ===
- Bank of Riviera

=== Solomon Islands ===
- Central Bank of Solomon Islands
- Solomon Islands Monetary Authority

=== Kingdom of Tonga ===
- Government of Tonga
- National Reserve Bank of Tonga

=== Vanuatu ===
- Central Bank of Vanuatu
- Reserve Bank of Vanuatu

=== Western Samoa ===
- Bank of Western Samoa
- Central Bank of Samoa
- Monetary Board of Western Samoa

== See also ==
- Sterling area
- List of British currencies
- Canadian banknote issuers
- South West African banknote issuers
- List of Commonwealth of Nations countries by GDP
- List of stock exchanges in the Commonwealth of Nations
