= Standard Chartered India =

Bank in India

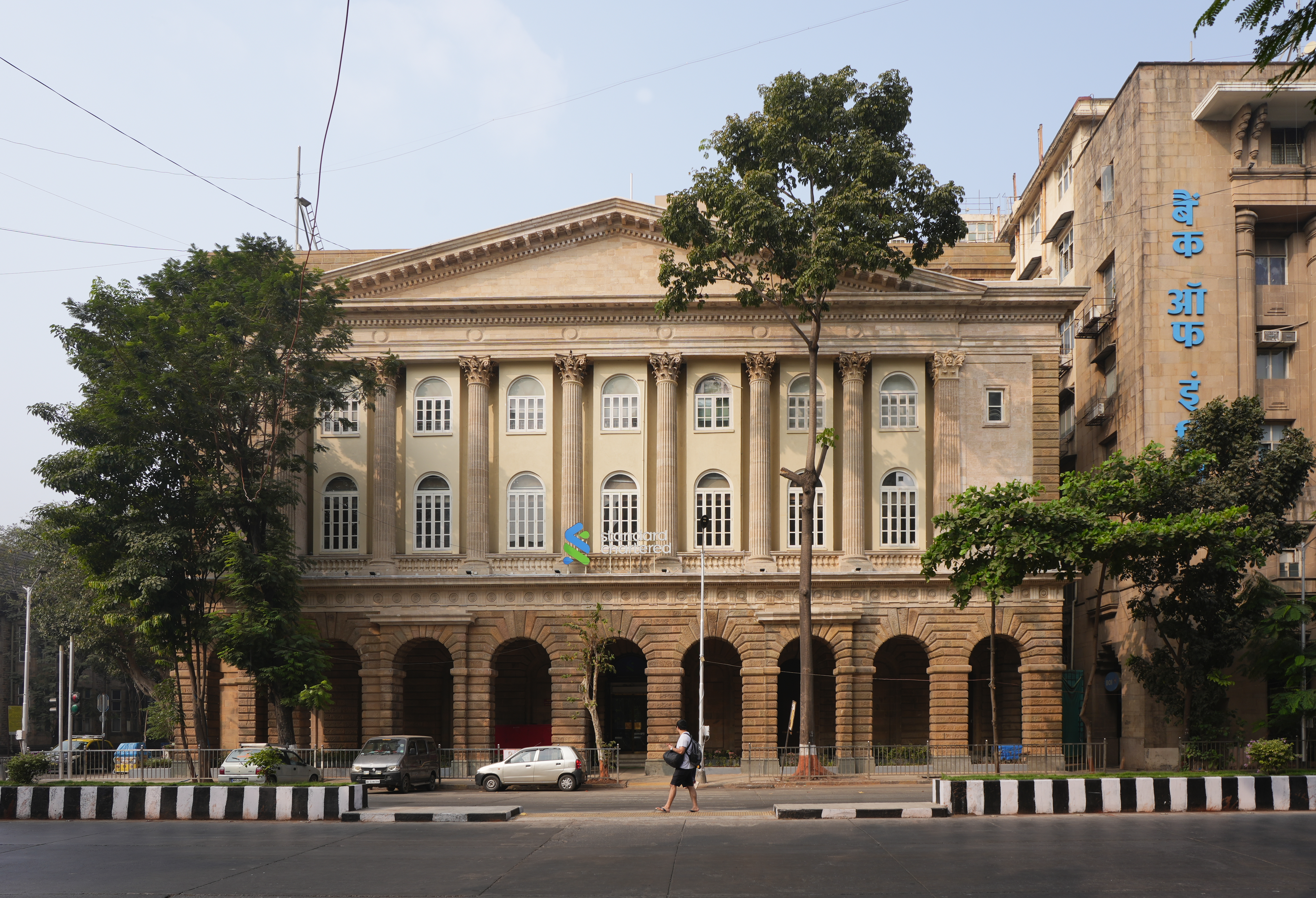
- Standard Chartered Bank Building in Mumbai.
- Type: Branch
- Industry: Bank, Financial services
- Predecessor: Chartered Bank of India, Australia and China
- Founded: 1853; 173 years ago, incorporated in London
- Headquarters: Bandra Kurla Complex, Bandra East, Mumbai, 400051, India
- Key people: Prabdev Singh (CEO)
- Products: Credit cards; Retail banking; Corporate banking; Mortgage loans; Wealth management
- Net income: ▲₹21,648 crore (US$2.2 billion) (2023)
- Total assets: ▲₹237,130 crore (US$25 billion) (2023)
- Parent: Standard Chartered
- Website: www.sc.bank.in

Standard Chartered India (officially Standard Chartered Bank India Branches) is a foreign branch of Standard Chartered, incorporated in the United Kingdom with limited liability. It is considered as a foreign bank under the Banking Regulation Act, 1949 and thus is regulated by the Reserve Bank of India (RBI). The bank has been operating in India for over 160 years, first as the Chartered Bank of India, Australia and China which set up its first branches in Kolkata and Mumbai in 1858. It is also the largest foreign bank in India, with 100 branches across 42 cities.

== History ==
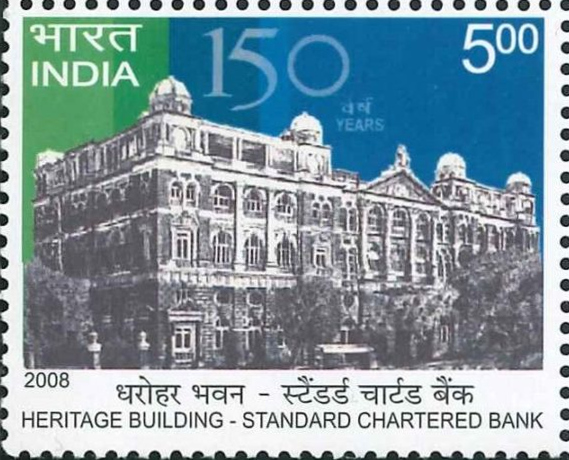
A 2008 stamp dedicated to the 150th anniversary of the Standard Chartered Bank of India

The predecessor of Standard Chartered India is The Chartered Bank of India, Australia and China which is a bank incorporated in London in 1853 by James Wilson following the grant of a Royal charter from Queen Victoria.

The bank expanded rapidly by capitalising the lucrative trade between Europe and Far East. It also financed regional projects such as the Indo-European telegraph line from London to Calcutta. In the early 20th century, the bank continued to tap on Asian business such as cotton from Bombay, indigo and tea from Calcutta and rice from Burma.

In 1969, Chartered Bank merged with the South African bank Standard Bank, forming Standard Chartered Bank. After the merger, the Indian branch of the bank continued to handle the local business.

In 2015, the bank announced its intention to be incorporated locally and become a wholly owned subsidiary (WOS). However, this plan has never been materialised and Standard Chartered India remained its status as a branch of foreign bank.

In 2024, the bank sold its 41 billion rupees personal loan portfolio to Kotak Mahindra Bank, as part of its plan to refresh strategy to target at higher end business. It is also announced that Zarin Daruwala, the bank's long-serving CEO since 2016, would retire in March 2025.
