= Alexander Croll =

Alexander Croll may refer to:

- Alexander Croll (merchant) (1811–1881), Irish merchant and banker in South Africa
- Alexander Angus Croll (1811–1887), British civil engineer
