= Perak (disambiguation) =

Perak is a state in Malaysia.

Perak may also refer to:

- Perak Malay, a dialect of Malay language
- Perak River
- Tun Perak, a bendahara of the Sultanate of Malacca
- Pérák, the Spring Man of Prague, a figure from Czechoslovak folklore
- Perak (headdress), worn by women in the Himalayan region
- Banknotes of the Chartered Bank of India, Australia and China (Perak)
- Silver is called perak in Malay language
