= W. Allen Dixon =

British architect of churches (1821–1893)

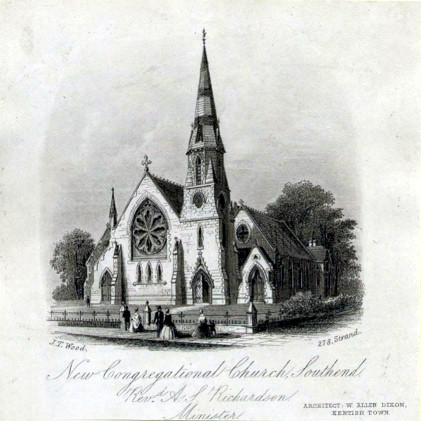
New Congregational Church, Southend. J.T. Wood, c. 1865.

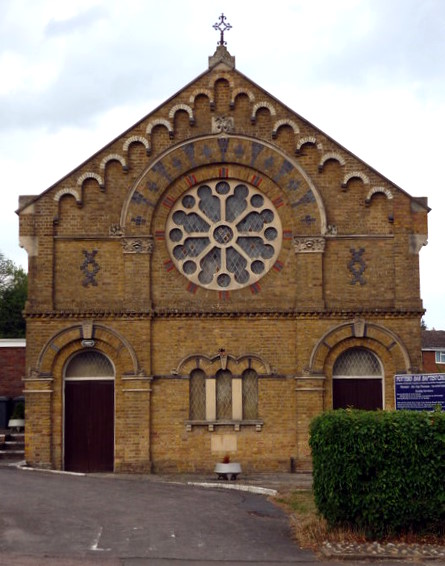
Potters Bar Old Baptist Church, 1868. Now used as a church hall.

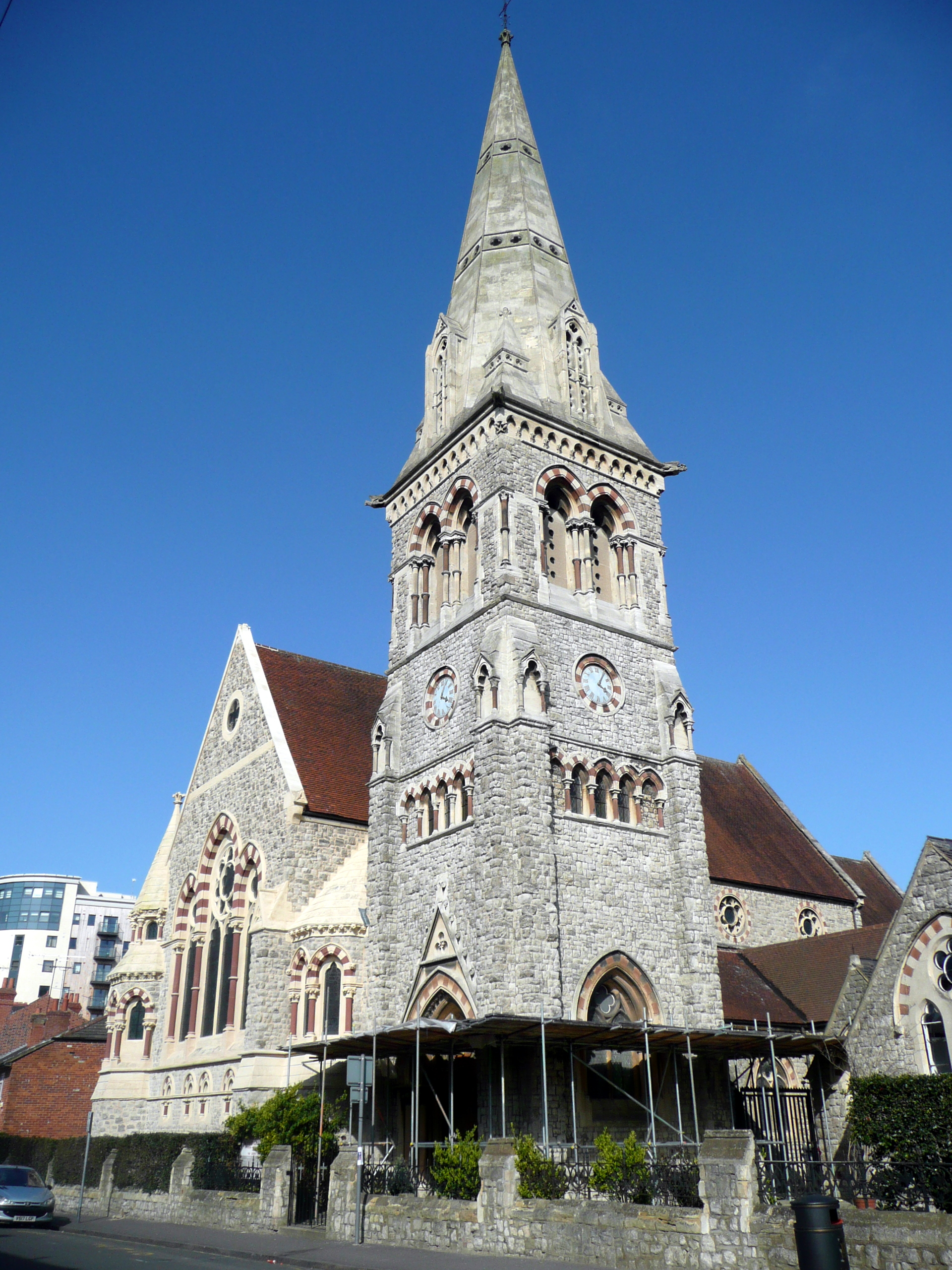
Sacred Heart, Watlington Street, Reading. c. 1872–75. Now known as the Polish Church.

William Allen Dixon (1821–1893) was a British architect who specialised in the design of churches and particularly Baptist churches. His heyday was in the late 1860s to the early 1870s when he designed at least five church in England, several of which are grade II listed buildings.

== Early life ==
Dixon was born in 1821 in Spalding, Lincolnshire, to Moses and Jane Dixon. He was baptised on 16 October 1821.

== Family ==
Dixon married Elizabeth Barker (born c. 1824, St Neots, Huntingdonshire) in the St Neots district in 1846.

By the time of the British 1861 census he was living at 1 Park Square, Newport, Monmouthshire, with Elizabeth and his daughter Mary Jane Dixon (born c. 1848, Kingston, Sussex). The family employed one servant, Catherine Murphy from Ireland, and had one house guest, Sarah Thorpe Gates (born 1834, Islington).

== Career ==
Dixon specialised in designing churches. His Cliff Town Congregational Church, Southend, Essex, was built in 1865, and is a grade II listed building with Historic England. In 1868, he designed the Potters Bar Old Baptist Church (as it is now known), at Barnet Road, Potters Bar, and his design for the Baptist Church in Station Road, New Barnet, was completed in around 1872 in a Renaissance style with elements of Romanesque. It has since been demolished. In 1872–75, he completed the Church of St John the Evangelist., Watlington Street, Reading, which was unusual for Dixon in being an Anglican church. It is now a Catholic church known as Sacred Heart or The Polish Church.

In 1872, The Architect recorded Dixon's address as 12 Bartholomew Road, Kentish Town. The Building News and Engineering Journal recorded that Dixon was acting as architect for "Colonel" Alexander Angus Croll (1811–1887) in alterations to Granard Park (or Lodge), Putney Park Lane, Roehampton, and the construction of a new church in its grounds. The church was originally a Baptist chapel but it later became the Anglican church of St Margaret, Putney Park Lane.

== Death ==
Dixon died in London in 1893.
