= Bank of British West Africa =

Former British colonial bank

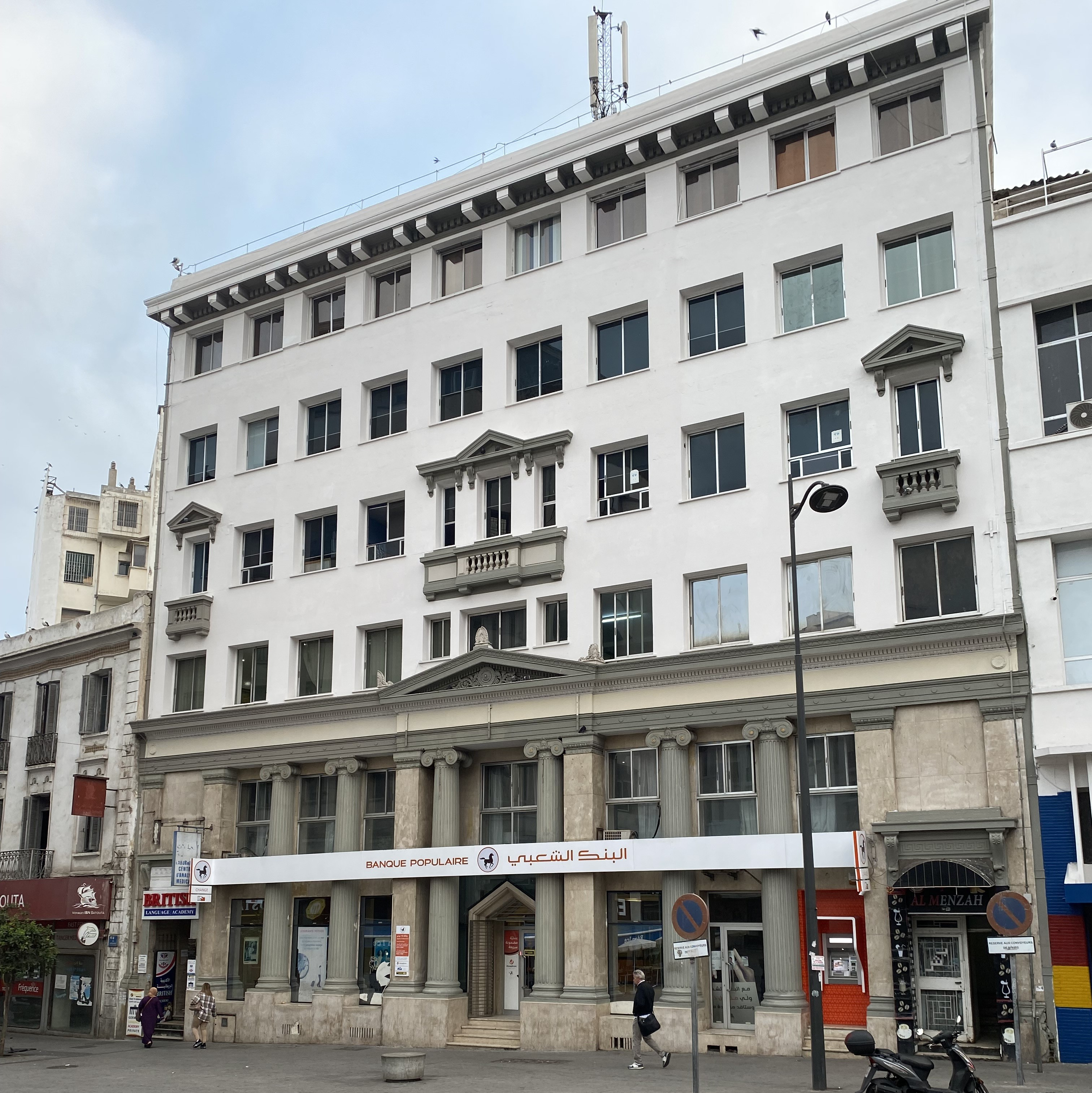
Former branch in Casablanca, designed by French architect Georges Vimort, later in use by Banque Populaire

Bank of British West Africa (BBWA) was a British Overseas bank that was important in introducing modern banking into the countries that emerged from the UK's West African colonies. In 1957 it changed its name to Bank of West Africa, and in 1965 was acquired by Standard Bank.

== History ==
- 1891 — Elder Dempster shipping magnate Alfred Lewis Jones (born in Carmarthen, Wales in 1845) and George William Neville (born at Richmond, near London in 1852), the local agent of Elder Dempster & Co. of Liverpool, attempted to develop a banking operation along the Guinea coast
- 1892 — African Banking Corporation acquired Elder Dempster's banking operations in Lagos, Nigeria. Within a year they wished to close it down. Instead, they sold the operation to A.L. Jones and Elder Dempster
- 1893 — Elder Dempster helped form Bank of British West Africa (BBWA) which took over the ex-ABC operation in Lagos. Eventually, BBWA established branches in Liverpool, London, and Manchester.
- 1894 — Elder Dempster Co, were appointed agents in Freetown, Sierra Leone and Bathurst, The Gambia for BBWA. BBWA also took over ABC's Tangier branch.
- 1896 — BBWA established a branch in Accra, Ghana. Its main business then was the distribution of silver coins, of which it was the sole supplier. As the only bank in the country at the time, it came to play a unique role in the economy, acting as the Central Bank. In 1902, it opened another branch in Sekondi. It opened an agency in Obuasi in 1905, which it raised to the status of a branch in 1909. In 1906 it opened a branch in Kumasi. British Bank of West Africa expanded its network to cover most of the main business centres in the Gold Coast and went on to dominate commercial banking in Ghana
- 1898 — BBWA established a branch in Freetown, Sierra Leone
- 1902 — BBWA established a branch in Bathurst, The Gambia
- In about 1910 BBWA established a branch in Tenerife, in the Canary Isles
- 1912 — BBWA took over the activities of Bank of Nigeria, which local merchants had established in 1899 or 1902 to create a competitor to BBWA
- 1915 — BBWA established a branch in Douala, The Cameroons, following the Anglo-French invasion
- 1916 — BBWA closed its branch in Douala following Douala's transfer to French administration, but opened an agency in New York City
- 1918 — BBWA opened a branch in Alexandria, Egypt
- 1919 — Lloyds Bank and three other banks became shareholders in BBWA
- 1912 — BBWA re-opened a branch in Douala, French Cameroons, and in Cairo
- 1923 — Standard Bank of South Africa took over BBWA's New York agency. Lloyds Bank acquired Cox & Co, which had branches in Egypt, but was itself a shareholder in BBWA. To avoid competing with itself, Lloyds had BBWA transfer its Egyptian business to Lloyds Bank. In 1926 Lloyds transferred its operations in Egypt to the National Bank of Egypt
- Between 1930 and 1940 BBWA closed most of its branches it had established in Morocco, the Canary Islands and Fernando Po
- In 1937 or so, BBWA established a branch in Hamburg, Germany
- 1953 — BBWA lost its central banking functions in Ghana. The Ghanaian government established the Bank of the Gold Coast to combine commercial banking activities and central banking functions
- In 1954 or so BBWA closed its Hamburg branch, which presumably had been in abeyance during World War II and reopened thereafter
- 1957 — Bank of British West Africa changed its name to Bank of West Africa (BWA)
- 1963 — BWA closed its branch in Tangier
- 1965 — Standard Bank acquired BWA, and renamed it Standard Bank of West Africa. SBWA acquired the Liberian and Nigerian branches of Chase Manhattan Bank in return for Chase taking a 15% stake in Standard Bank, a stake that it sold in the late 1970s. BWA still operated one branch each in the French and British Cameroon Mandates, and in Morocco
- 1969 — Standard Bank merged with Chartered Bank to form Standard Chartered Bank. SBWA spun off Standard Bank of Ghana, Standard Bank Nigeria, and Standard Bank of Sierra Leone, which went on to have separate histories
  - 1 January 1985 — the Ghanaian operation became Standard Chartered Bank Ghana, under which name it continues to operate
  - 1971 — Standard Bank of Nigeria placed 13% of its share capital with Nigerian investors. After the end of the Nigerian Civil War, Nigeria's military government sought to increase local control of the retail-banking sector. Standard Chartered Bank's investment in Standard Bank Nigeria fell to 38%, and the bank changed its name to First Bank of Nigeria in 1979. Standard Chartered sold its remaining shares in First Bank of Nigeria in 1996. The present Standard Chartered Bank Nigeria, therefore, traces its presence in Nigeria only to 1999, when the bank re-entered Nigeria with a new, wholly owned subsidiary
  - The present Standard Chartered Bank Sierra Leone traces its corporate history back to BBWA's commissioning the Elder Dempster as its agents in Freetown in 1894
- Between 1969 and 1974, Standard Bank also closed the branches (Douala and Victoria) in Cameroon that it inherited from BWA
- By 1974 SBWA had only two branches, both in The Gambia, and in 1978, SBWA transferred these two branches to Standard Bank Gambia Ltd. Until 2002, by then Standard Chartered Bank Gambia remained the only bank in The Gambia.

== See also ==
- Banque de l'Afrique Occidentale
