= James Wilson (businessman) =

Scottish businessman, economist and politician

The Right Honourable James Wilson
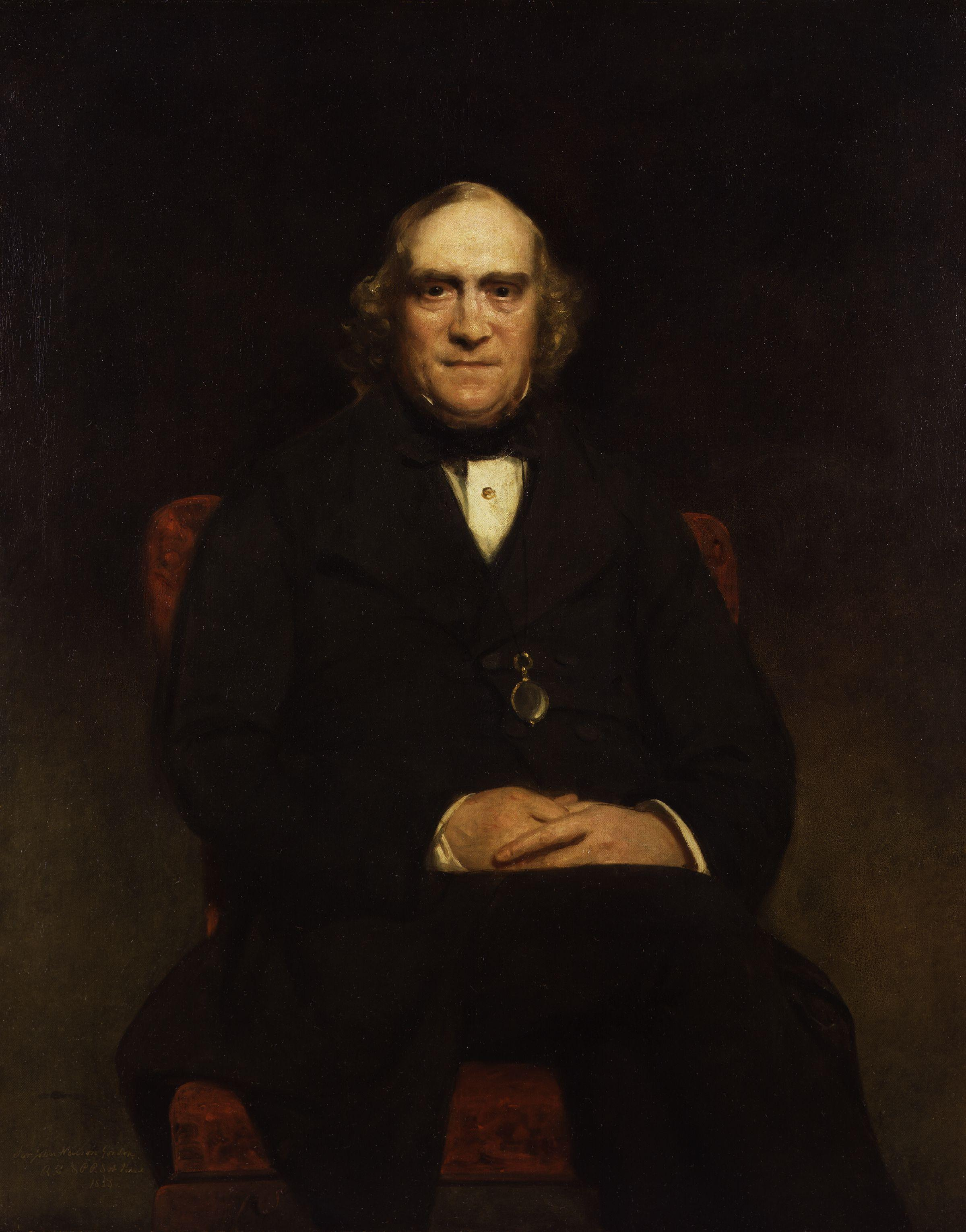
- A portrait of James Wilson by Sir John Wilson Gordon, published in The Pursuit of Reason: The Economist 1843–1993. The portrait was presented to Mrs Wilson in 1859, by the Royal Scottish Academy.

Financial Secretary to the Treasury
- In office 5 January 1853 – 21 February 1858
- Monarch: Victoria
- Prime Minister: The Earl of Aberdeen; The Viscount Palmerston
- Preceded by: George Alexander Hamilton
- Succeeded by: George Alexander Hamilton

Paymaster General and Vice-President of the Board of Trade
- In office 18 June 1859 – 12 August 1859
- Monarch: Victoria
- Prime Minister: The Viscount Palmerston
- Preceded by: Lord Lovaine
- Succeeded by: Hon. William Cowper

Finance Member, Viceroy's Executive Council
- In office December 1859 – 11 August 1860
- Monarch: Victoria
- Governor-General: Charles Canning, 1st Earl Canning
- Prime Minister: The Viscount Palmerston
- Preceded by: Position established
- Succeeded by: Samuel Laing

Personal details
- Born: 3 June 1805 Hawick, Roxburghshire, Scotland
- Died: 11 August 1860 (aged 55) Calcutta, India
- Citizenship: United Kingdom
- Party: Whig; Liberal
- Spouse: Elizabeth Preston
- Children: 6

James Wilson (3 June 1805 – 11 August 1860) was a Scottish businessman, economist, and Liberal politician who founded The Economist weekly and the Chartered Bank of India, Australia and China, which merged with Standard Bank in 1969 to form Standard Chartered. He was the first Finance Member of the Viceroy's Executive Council from December 1859 until his death in August 1860. Sent there to put order into the chaos that followed the "Sepoy Mutiny" of 1857, he presented India's first budget, and was responsible for the government accounting system, Pay Office, and audit, apart from government paper currency, Indian Police, a Military Finance Commission, and a Civil Finance Commission.

== Early life ==
Wilson was born in Hawick in the Scottish Borders. His Quaker father William Wilson owned a hat manufactury, and his ancestors were local sheep farmers. He was the fourth of fifteen children, of whom ten reached adulthood. His mother died when James was young.

A successful disciplined autodidact scholar from a Quaker family, he was destined to be a schoolmaster but hated it so much that he "would rather to be the most menial servant in [his] father's mill". After considering studying law with a view to becoming an advocate, a profession which would have meant abandoning his family religion, Wilson decided instead to learn business, and at the age of sixteen became an apprentice in a hat factory. Later, his father bought the business for him and his elder brother, William. When James Wilson was nineteen, the brothers left Scotland and migrated to London, with a gift of £2,000 each, equivalent to £189,841 in 2025.

== Career ==
=== Business ===
The brothers established a manufacturing factory—Wilson, Irwin & Wilson—that they dissolved in 1831. Wilson continued in the same line of business with much success (his net worth was £25,000 in 1837, equivalent to £2,420,008 in 2025. During the economic crisis of 1837, he lost most of his wealth when the price of indigo fell. By 1839, he had sold most of his property and avoided bankruptcy. However, in 1853 he founded the Chartered Bank of India, Australia and China, which later merged with the Standard Bank to form Standard Chartered Bank in 1969.

=== Journalism ===
Wilson was generally opposed to privileging the Church of England, the secret ballot when it was proposed in 1853, and the Corn Laws. He wrote a pamphlet titled Influences of the Corn Laws, as affecting all classes of the community, and particularly the landed interests. It slowly received positive feedback and Wilson's fame had grown. He then went on writing on currency, and especially The Revenue; or, What should the Chancellor do?. He started to write for newspapers, including the Manchester Guardian. In 1843 he established The Economist as a newspaper to campaign for free trade, and acted as Chief editor and sole proprietor for sixteen years. His overarching goal to end vested interests in the Westminster parliament wherever these led to poverty or starvation, as the Corn Laws most notably had done. An article Wilson published in April 1848 in opposition to the Ten Hours Bill was criticised by Karl Marx for misunderstanding profit and the working day. The Economist is still published today, now with a weekly circulation of over 1.6 million globally. Wilson was the most respected statistician of his times and saw economics as an optimistic and rational way of mediating socially sustainable futures drawing on the Scottish School of Adam Smith and the French "Entrepreneur" School of Jean-Baptiste Say.

=== Politics ===
Wilson entered the House of Commons as Liberal Member of Parliament for Westbury, Wiltshire, in 1847. Due to his economic experience, in 1848, prime minister Lord John Russell appointed Wilson as Secretary of the Board of Control, which supervised the East India Company's control of British India, a post he held until the government fell in 1852. He then served as Financial Secretary to the Treasury between 1853 and 1858, firstly in Lord Aberdeen's coalition government and secondly in Lord Palmerston's first administration. In 1857, he was returned to Parliament for Devonport. He again briefly held office under Palmerston as Paymaster General and Vice-President of the Board of Trade between June and August 1859, and was sworn of the Privy Council the same year.

In August 1859, Wilson resigned these offices and his seat in parliament to sit as the financial member of the Council of India. He was sent by Queen Victoria to India to establish the tax structure, a new paper currency, and remodel India's finance system after the Rebellion of 1857. However, he was in office only a year before he died. In 1860, he refused to leave the stifling summer heat of Calcutta, contracted dysentery, and died in August of that year at age 55.

Despite his prominent public role, Wilson was buried unknown at a cemetery at Mullick Bazar in Kolkata. His grave was discovered in 2007 by Chandra Prakash Bhatia (IRS), Commissioner of Income Tax (Retd.), while researching a book on India's tax history. The efforts of Mr. C.P. Bhatia was acknowledged by then FM, Shri Pranab Mukherjee, for bringing out the truth around beginning of modern India's tax history. Wilson's tombstone was restored by the Christian Burial Board.

== Family ==
Wilson married Elizabeth Preston of Newcastle-upon-Tyne in January 1832. They had six daughters, of whom Eliza, the eldest, married Walter Bagehot.

== Works ==
- Influences of the corn laws, as affecting all classes of the community, and particularly the landed interests
- Fluctuations of currency, commerce, and manufactures : referable to the corn laws

Parliament of the United Kingdom
Preceded by Sir Ralph Lopes, Bt	Member of Parliament for Westbury; 1847–1857	Succeeded by Sir Massey Lopes, Bt
Preceded by Sir George Berkeley; Thomas Erskine Perry	Member of Parliament for Devonport; 1857–1859; With: Thomas Erskine Perry 1857–1859; Sir Michael Seymour 1859	Succeeded by Sir Michael Seymour; Sir Arthur William Buller
Political offices
Preceded by Thomas Wyse; George Cornewall Lewis	Joint Secretary of the Board of Control; 1848–1852; With: Thomas Wyse 1848–1849; Hon. John Elliot 1849–1852	Succeeded by Henry Baillie; Charles Bruce
Preceded by George Alexander Hamilton	Financial Secretary to the Treasury; 1853–1858	Succeeded by George Alexander Hamilton
Preceded by Lord Lovaine	Paymaster General; 1859	Succeeded by Hon. William Cowper
Preceded by Lord Lovaine	Vice-President of the Board of Trade; 1859	Succeeded by Hon. William Cowper
