= Sacred Heart Church, Reading =

Church building in Berkshire, England

Coordinates: 51.4530°N 0.9609°W

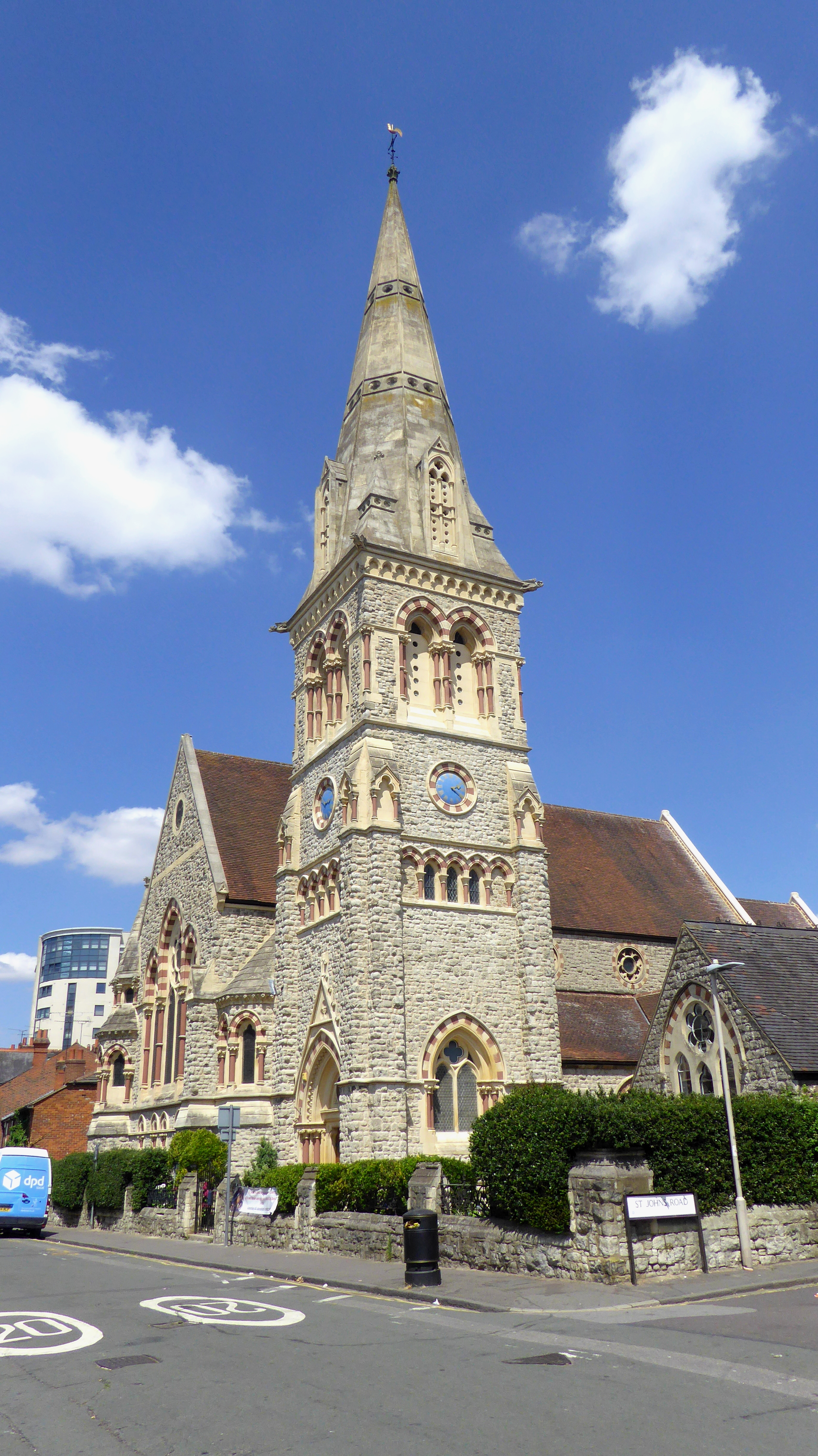
Sacred Heart, Watlington Street, Reading. c. 1872–73. Also known as the Polish Church.

Sacred Heart Church, Watlington Street, Reading, is a Catholic church also known as the Polish Church.

The church was designed by W. Allen Dixon in 1872–73 and was originally an Anglican church known as the Church of St John the Evangelist. After it became disused it was taken up by the Polish community in Reading and is now a Catholic church. The building is grade II listed with Historic England.
