= St Margaret's Church, Putney =

Coordinates: 51.459100°N 0.234439°W

St Margaret's, Putney
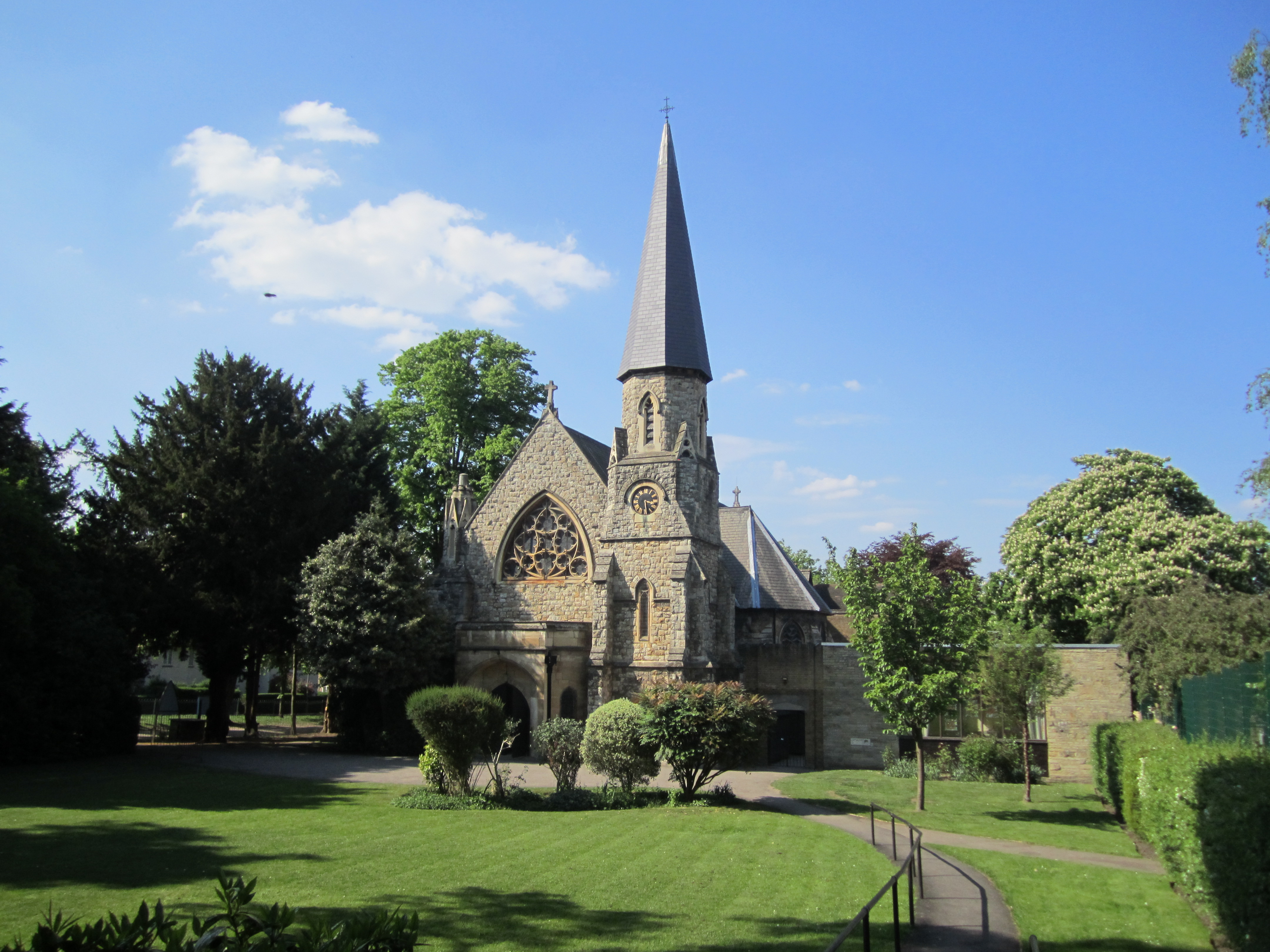
- St Margaret's, Putney
- Location: Putney, London, England
- Denomination: Church of England
- Previous denomination: Presbyterian and Baptist
- Tradition: Broad Church
- Website: www.stmargaretsputney.org

History
- Founded: 1873
- Dedication: St Margaret of Antioch
- Dedicated: 1912

Administration
- Diocese: Southwark
- Deanery: Wandsworth

Clergy
- Vicar: The Revd Dr Brutus Green

St Margaret's, Putney is situated in Putney Park Lane, Putney, London, England. It was designed by W. Allen Dixon in 1872. Prior to its dedication to St Margaret as an Anglican church it was first a Baptist and then a Presbyterian chapel under the name of Granard Chapel. It is part of the Wandsworth Deanery in the Southwark Diocese of the Church of England, and is also a member of Churches Together in Putney and Roehampton. It is a member of Inclusive Church and during Winter months it runs a homeless shelter once a week with Glass Door. The vicar is currently (2020) the Revd Dr Brutus Green.

== Granard Chapel ==
The original parish church for Putney from Norman times was St Mary the Virgin, Wimbledon, a four-mile walk away. By 1302 St Mary the Virgin, Putney had been built in its current place by the river as a Chapel of Ease, becoming its own parish in 1658. The Victorians, ever keen church builders constructed Holy Trinity, Roehampton in 1842 (becoming a parish in 1862), St John's in 1859 and All Saints’ In 1874. From 1871 to 1911 the population of Putney grew from 9000 to 25,000 requiring a further church. In 1872, The Building News and Engineering Journal recorded that W. Allen Dixon was acting as architect for Colonel Alexander Croll in alterations to Granard Park (or Lodge), Putney Park Lane, Roehampton, and the construction of a new church in its grounds. It was originally a Baptist chapel completed in 1873 in memory of his mother, for the lodge which is now the site of Granard primary school. When the chapel was transferred to the Presbyterians in 1879 the Reverend Donald Matheson was appointed minister. He was a bright young thing who, having studied in Germany, where liberal attitudes to Biblical criticism were prevalent, controversially brought in the new translation of the Bible, the Revised Standard Version on its publication in 1881. He was keen on singing and held classes for his congregation as well as sending out postcards with the Sunday hymns on for his flock to practice. Most notably he set up the Granard Debating Society, where a young Ramsay MacDonald opened a debate on socialism. Within the congregation was also the Victorian Liberal and Radical John Bright and a future Lord Chancellor, Douglas Hogg, the first Viscount Hailsham. By 1898 the Presbyterians had moved to Briar Walk and the chapel was left vacant.

== Dedication to St Margaret ==
With rising numbers in Putney, Canon Thurston Rivington, vicar of Putney, was on the lookout for a new church building for the developing West Putney. After a slow moving appeal for the £2000 needed, Mr Seth Taylor, having thankfully foregone former ideas of turning it into a laundry or simply knocking it down, magnanimously gave the chapel to Putney parish. The church was dedicated to St Margaret of Antioch, the namesake of one of Mr Taylor's daughters, on Saturday 5 October 1912 by Bishop Hook. The church overflowed with people singing the first hymn: “Christ is Made the Sure Foundation”. As it stood at this time there was a meeting room under the church, which hosted the Granard Debating Society. It was designed with a high ceiling to accommodate the heavy smokers, which meant the floor of the church was greatly elevated and there was a great set of steps outside leading to a triple archway. These were disposed of and a new flat topped porch built at ground level. They also removed the large full immersion Baptist font which was located in the middle of the nave, brought in electric lights, heating and new oak pews, and trimmed the ivy. Much of this work was paid for by our generous benefactor Seth Taylor, whose family continued to support the parish after his death in 1917. But as a former Baptist chapel St Margaret's is unusual in the Church of England for facing North, not East. As one incumbent has said, “There will not be many Anglican Churches which can claim the distinction of being descended from both Baptists and Presbyterians.” (1959), the Revd C.J. Studdert-Kennedy, vicar of St Margaret's, Putney (1956-1966).

== The Parish of St Margaret's, Putney ==
In 1913 plans were made to enlarge the parish but the Great War intervened. After the War there was a great Peace Celebration on the meadows to the West of Putney Park Lane which at the time belonged to Dover House and Putney Park House. 4000 children attended with many sports, activities and fireworks. Commemorative mugs and plates were made and presented by local MP Samuel Samuels. The Revd Percy Wallis, who was to become the first vicar, took charge in 1918. He discovered a church with no organ, no hall, no vicarage and no endowment, and no license for carrying out weddings (achieved in 1920). A house was purchased for a vicarage on Luttrell Avenue (1923) and a fund set up for the curate's stipend. The present Choir stalls were given anonymously in thanks for preservation during the war. Unusually they are a war memorial in themselves, and are decorated with symbols of war on one side and peace on the other. Then in 1921 the London County Council bought the Putney Park Estate and built the Dover House Estate around Putney Park House, while demolishing Dover House and developing its grounds. This hugely increased the local population, leading to St Margaret's becoming its own parish on 19 February 1924. (Its first magazine, which still runs today was printed in January 1924.)

A larger church was also required and so under W.A. Forsyth's design, the nave was extended with an additional transept and a new chancel, Lady Chapel, sanctuary (with altar, altar rails and reredos) and vestry. With the larger church the pulpit was brought to a more central position, raised on a base and stairs added. The foundation stone was laid on 1 October 1925 in the West wall of the vestry. The newly extended church, almost twice the size, was dedicated by the Right Reverend Herbert, the Bishop of Southwark, on 19 February 1926. This fell within a larger movement of church-building in the interwar period, making St Margaret's one of the ‘Twenty Five’ churches of Southwark diocese, from whom it received a grant for works. At this time the children of the parish, by themselves, raised money to pay for glass in the Sanctuary, installed in 1929. With increasing activity a church hall was required. The diocese refused to permit this until the work on the church was completed. While the extension work was being carried out a hut was donated, which did a good forty years service. But in 1930 a church hall, built close by on the Pleasance, was dedicated by the Bishop of Southwark on 16 June.

On 3 September 1939, there is a note in the Service Register for the 13th Sunday after Trinity reading “Air Raid Warning”, with the word ‘Sermon’ after Matins crossed out. The Children's service was cancelled and again the sermon was cut from Evensong. Thereafter Evensong moved to 3pm, the children were evacuated and most activities ceased. Evening services were later transferred to the Hall where it was easier to take black-out precautions. The Methodist church on Gwendolen Avenue, along with the Presbyterians in Briar Walk and St John's all suffered significant damage in the war and St Margaret's too suffered when a flying bomb hit a garden at the back of Woodborough Road, severely damaging the church hall, and shattering some of the glass and causing harm to the ceiling in the church. A Thanksgiving service for victory in Europe was held in St Margaret's on the evening of 7 May 1945.

During the 1950s there were several changes to the interior. A new organ case was bought, and the East (North) end was refurbished. The oak work was cleaned, bleached and polished, the reredos and communion rail were picked out in gold leaf and colour and new altar furnishings were installed. The Lady Chapel also saw a communion rail and screen, and in 1965 St Margaret's purchased a portable font. In 1960 the Church Hall in the Pleasance was given to estate agents to let, and in 1962 the upper hall was built, followed by the lower hall and Church House in 1972. In 2012 as part of the Centenary Appeal, a kitchen and toilet were added.

== The Windows of St Margaret's, Putney ==
The windows in the Sanctuary were made by Burlison and Grylls, though they are unmarked. In the Lady Chapel the windows were made by Kempe Studios. Run by Walter Tower after Kempe's death, his maker's mark featured a wheat sheaf with a red tower. After his son was killed in the First World War the tower turned black, which is the mark found at St Margaret's. In the Lady Chapel you may also notice some flecks of black which are remainders of the black-out paint used during the war. Elsewhere it is noticeable that there is green and clear glass in the church. The clear glass was brought in to replace the green glass that was shattered during the explosion of a nearby bomb.

== Gallery ==
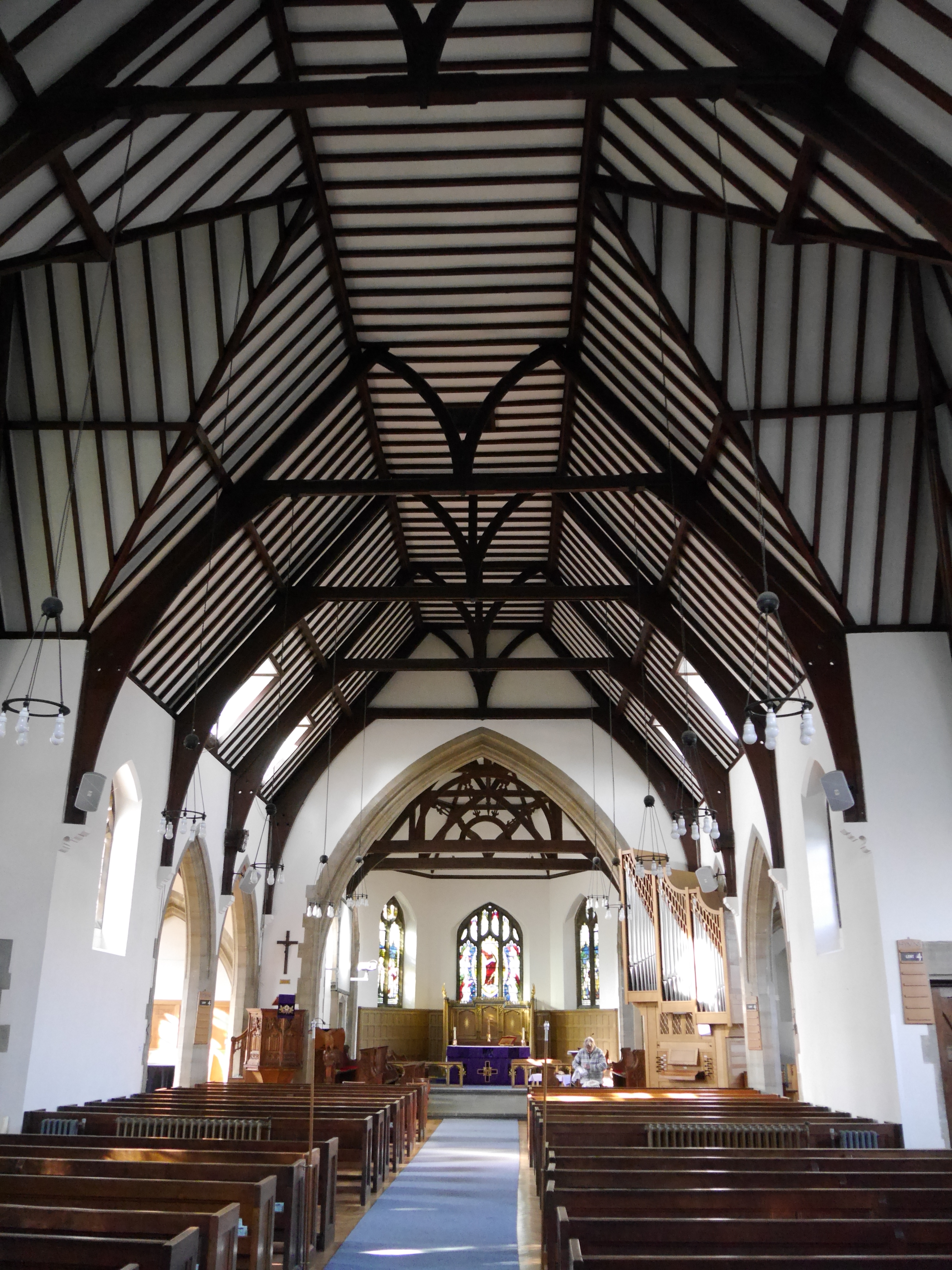
Interior view.

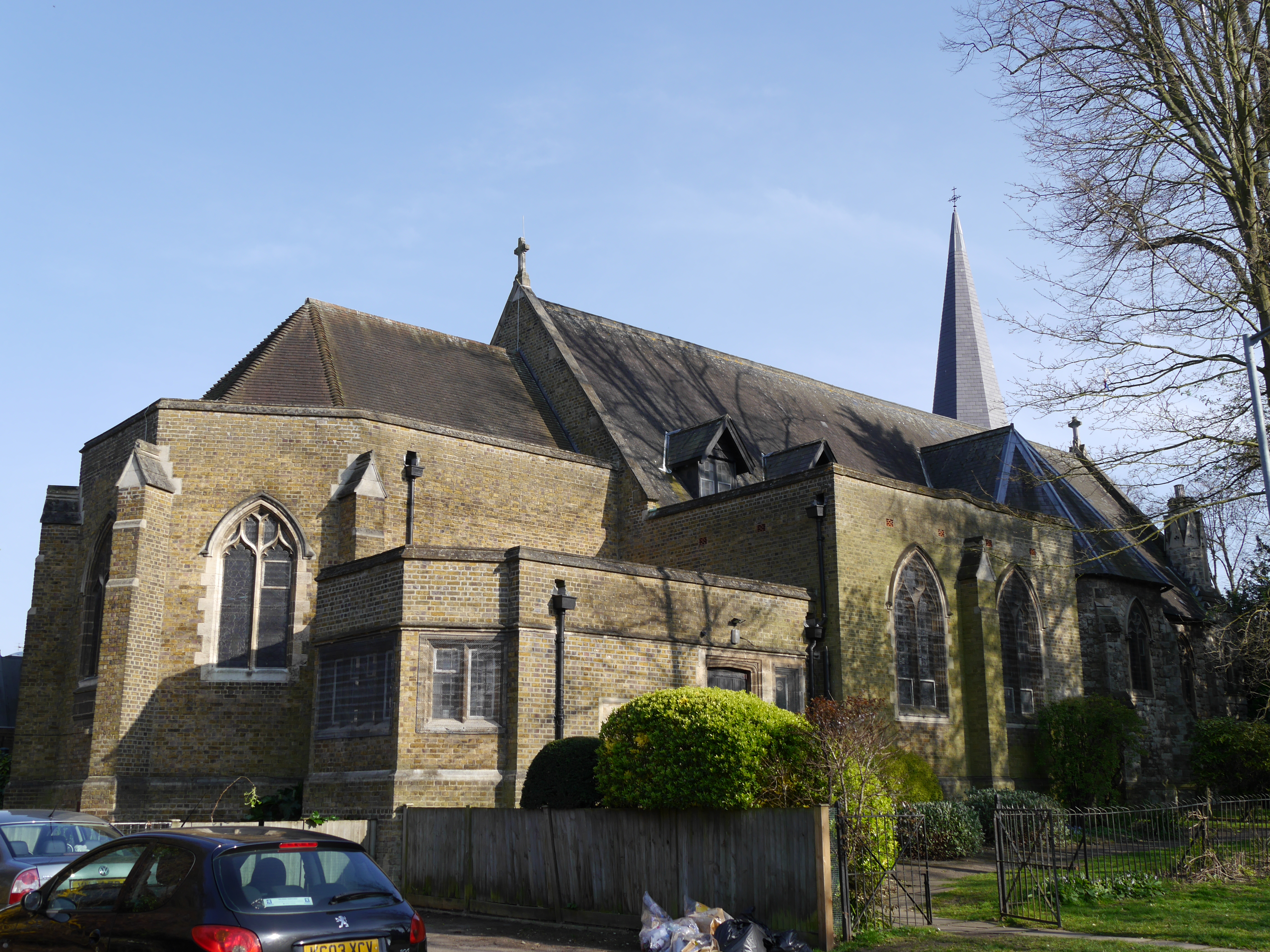
Rear view.

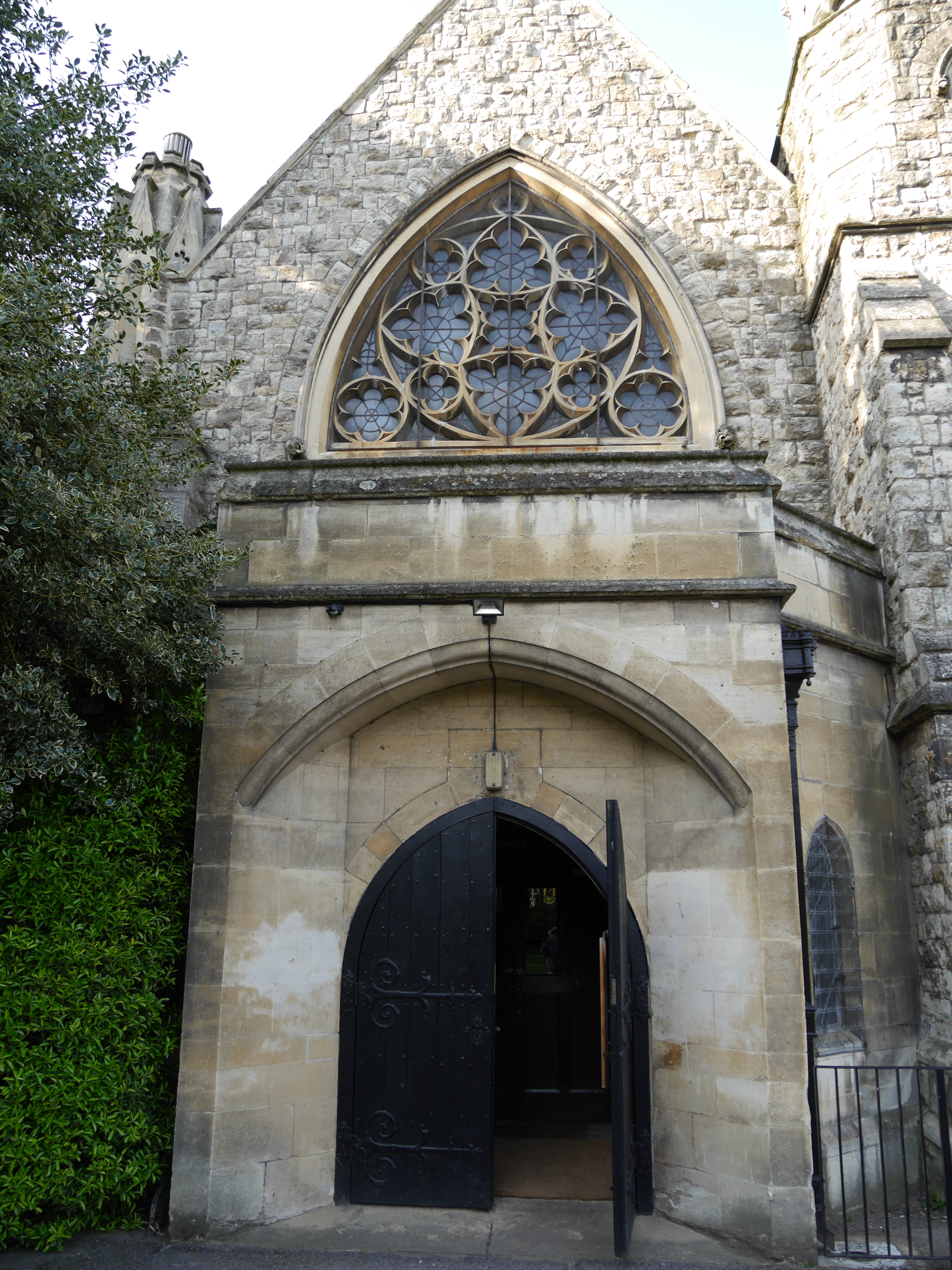
Main entrance.

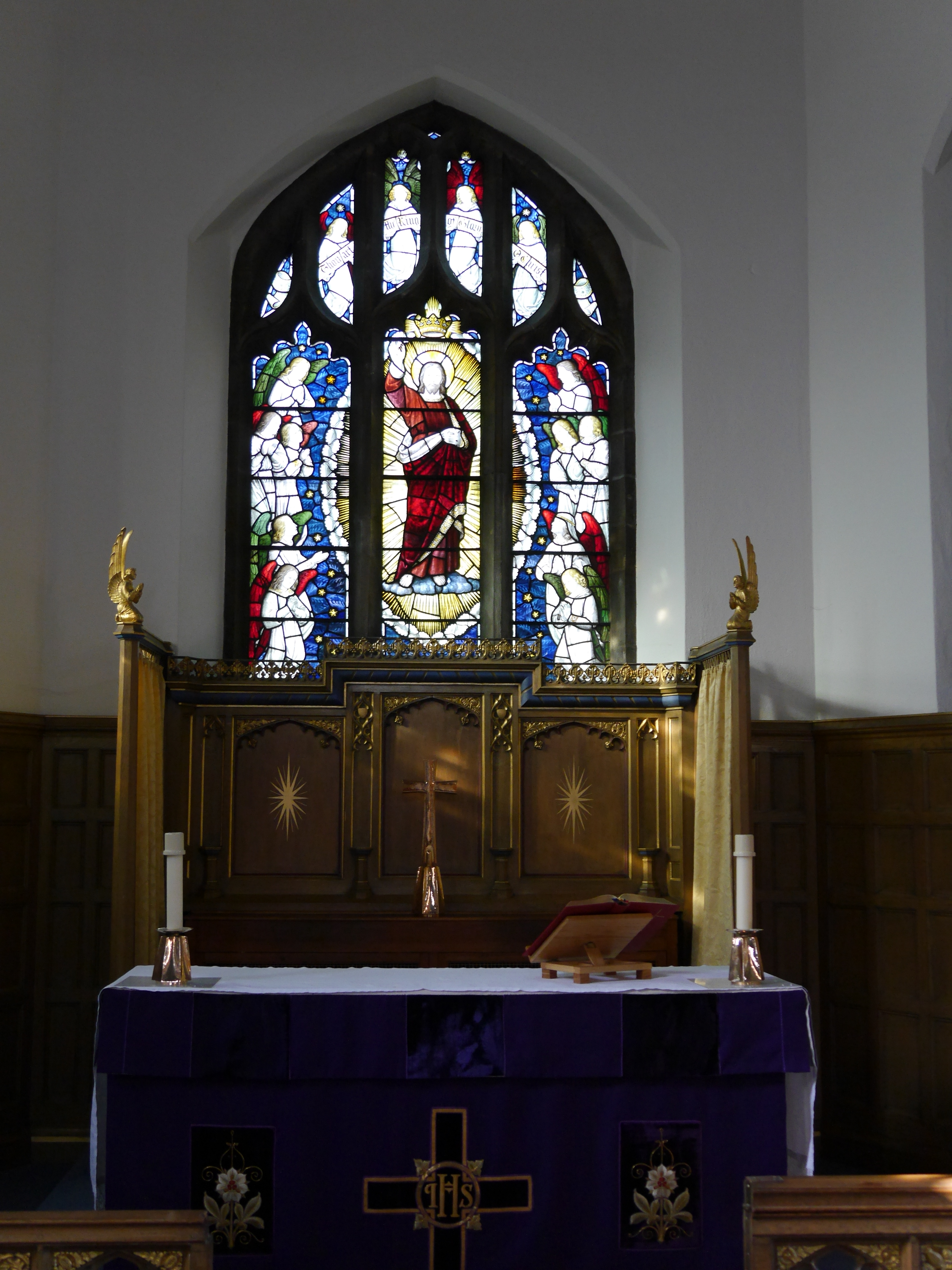
Stained glass window.

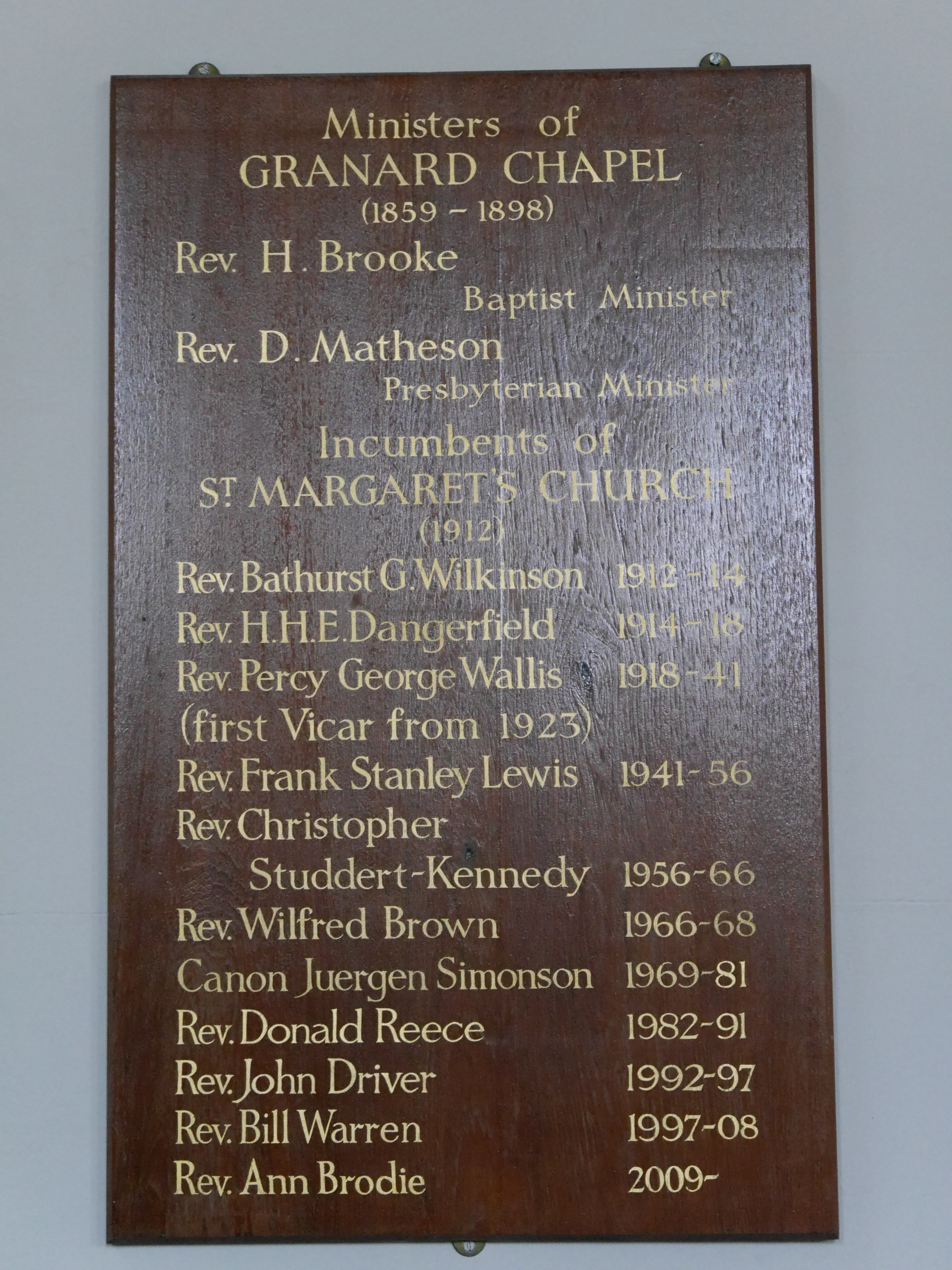
List of ministers and incumbents.
