= Cliff Town Congregational Church =

Church in Southend-on-Sea, Essex, England

Coordinates: 51°32′09″N 0°42′38″E

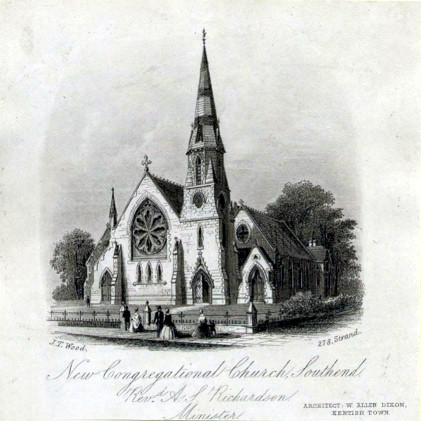
New Congregational Church, Southend. J.T. Wood, c. 1865

The Cliff Town Congregational Church is a Grade II listed church in Southend-on-Sea, Essex, England. It was designed by W. Allen Dixon in around 1865. The Church is now deconsecrated, and is now the Clifftown Theatre, and hosts the East 15 theatre school run by the University of Essex.

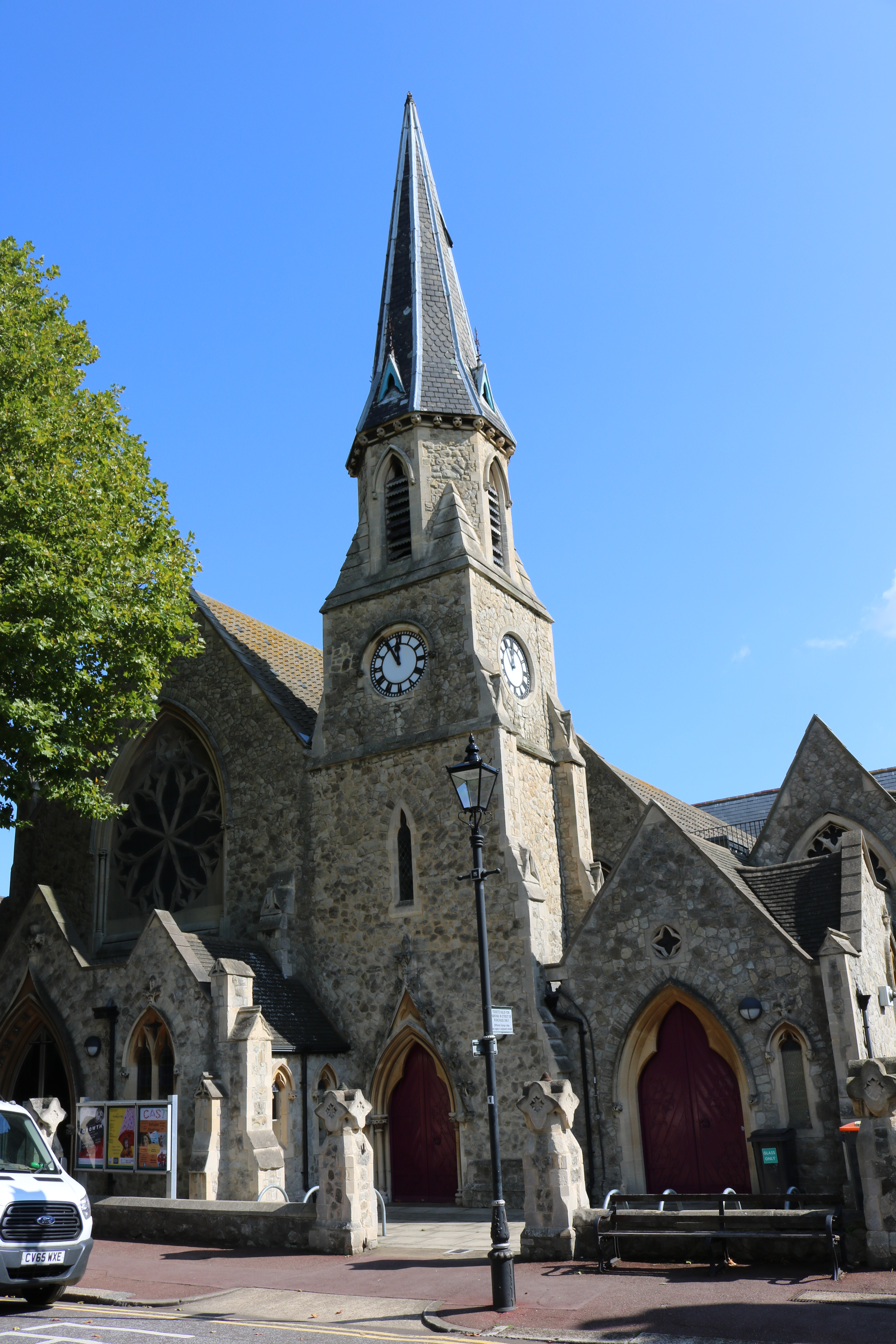
The church in modern times
