= Alexander Angus Croll =

British civil engineer

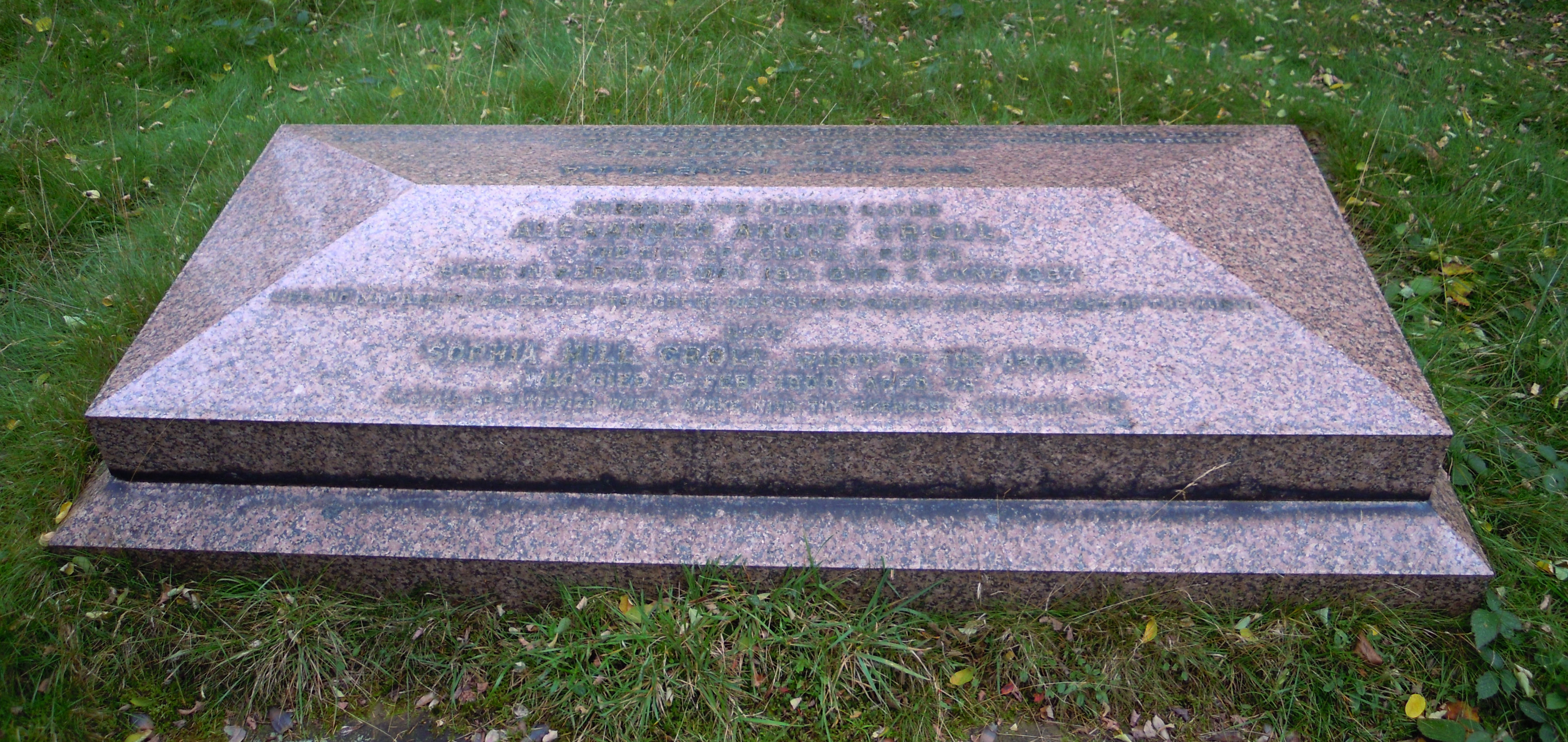
Grave of Alexander Angus Croll in Brookwood Cemetery

Alexander Angus Croll (1811–1887) was a British civil engineer who patented a method of purifying town gas of ammonia. He was Sheriff of the City of London.

He is buried in Brookwood Cemetery.

== Granard Park ==
Croll was the owner of Granard Park (or Lodge) Putney Park Lane, Roehampton. In 1872, The Building News and Engineering Journal recorded that architect W. Allen Dixon was acting for "Colonel" Croll in alterations to Granard Park and the construction of a new church in its grounds. The church was originally a Baptist chapel but it later became the Anglican church of St Margaret, Putney Park Lane.
