= Alexander Croll (merchant) =

Irish merchant and banker (1811-1881)

- Born: April 1811
- Died: 13 April 1881 (aged 69–70); Upper Norwood, London
- Occupations: Merchant and banker
- Board member of: Standard Bank of British South Africa; Graham's Town Fire and Marine Assurance Company; London and South African Bank

Alexander Croll (April 1811 – 13 April 1881) was an Irish merchant and banker in Cape Colony. He traded in England before moving to Cape Colony and becoming the first agent for the Standard Bank of South Africa in Port Elizabeth. He was a freemason and the director of a number of other companies. He made a fortune and retired to England.

== Early life and family ==
Alexander Croll was born in Ireland in April 1811.

He married Mary Ann Rea in Dundee in 1850. They had no children.

== Career ==
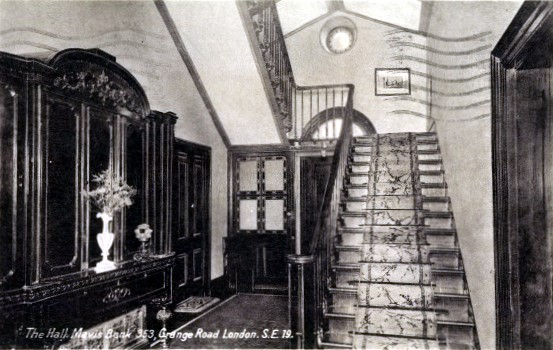
The Hall, Mavis Bank, c. 1938.

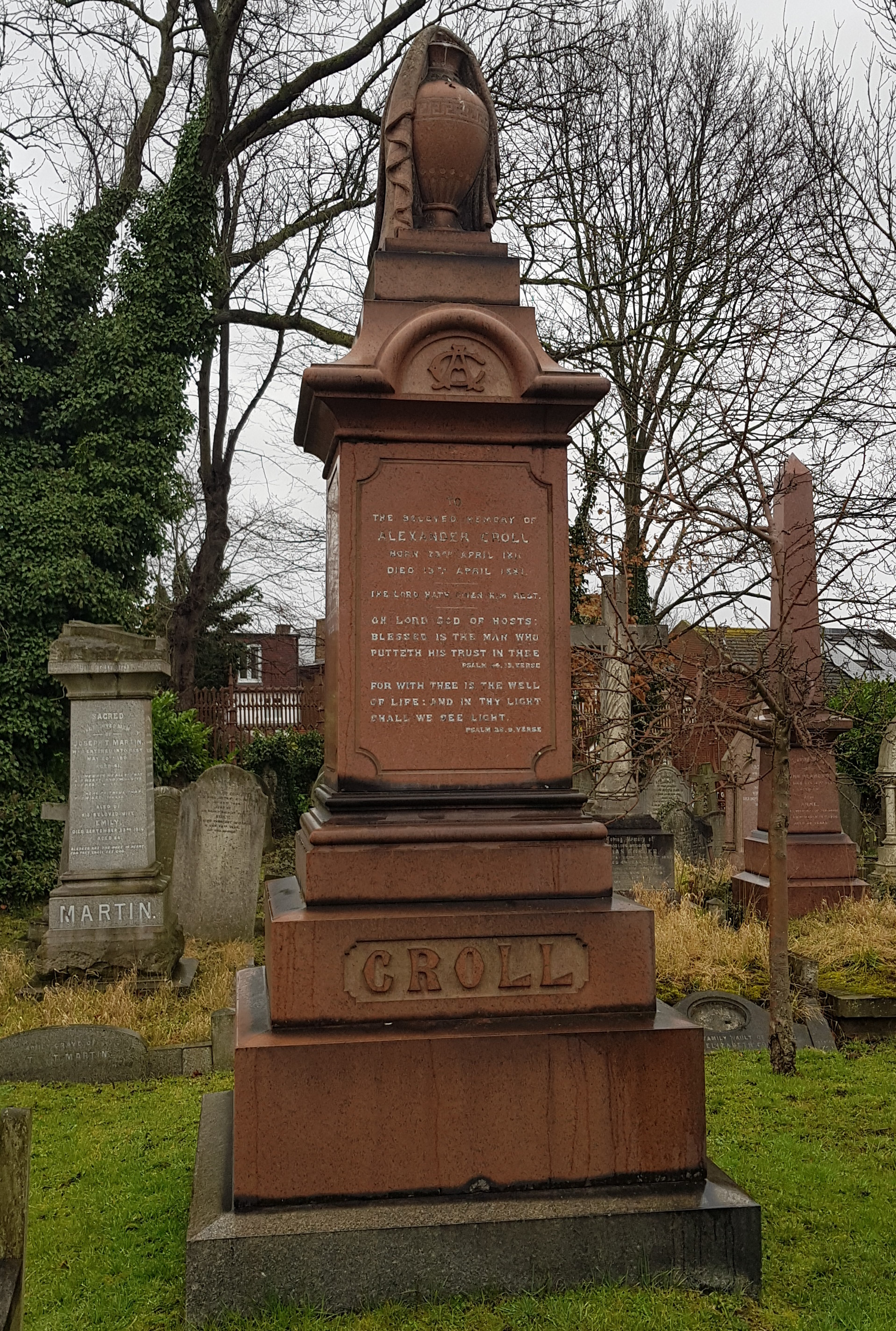
The Croll monument at West Norwood Cemetery

Croll's early career was spent in Britain trading as a merchant with South Africa from Hastings in Sussex, possibly importing wheat or wine.

From at least 1845 he was resident in Cape Colony trading as a merchant. His wife was related to the wealthy diamond merchant Richard Townroe (1831-1889) and Croll may have had involvement in that trade.

In 1857-59 he is recorded as living in Port Elizabeth, Cape Town. In 1863, as Alexander Croll & Company, he was the first agent for the Standard Bank of South Africa, discounting bills for the bank through his offices in Port Elizabeth through which the bank started operations in the colony. He became a director of the bank and was also a director of the London and South African Bank and Graham's Town Fire and Marine Assurance Company.

== Later life ==
By 1871, Croll had retired and was living at 16 The Boltons, Kensington, where he employed five servants. By 1874 he and his wife had moved to the less exclusive Mavis Bank, a Victorian villa at 353 Grange Road, Upper Norwood, but still employed six servants, two of whom were nurses, one described as a "sick nurse".

Croll died on 13 April 1881. The cause of death was recorded as jaundice. He was buried at West Norwood Cemetery as was his wife on her death in 1912. He left an estate of under £140,000.
