= Potters Bar Old Baptist Church =

Former church in Hertfordshire, England

Coordinates: 51.6897°N 0.1784°W

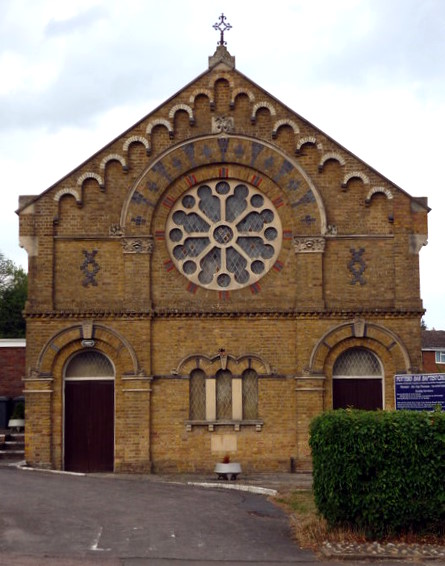
Potters Bar Old Baptist Church.

The Potters Bar Old Baptist Church, as it is now known, is a former church in Hertfordshire, England. It was designed by W. Allen Dixon in 1868.

The church replaced an earlier Baptist Church of 1789. It was registered for worship by the Particular Baptists and extended in 1884. The church was damaged by a German V2 missile in 1945. The building is used as a church hall and a newer Baptist church has been built alongside.
