= Bank of Auckland =

Defunct bank of New Zealand

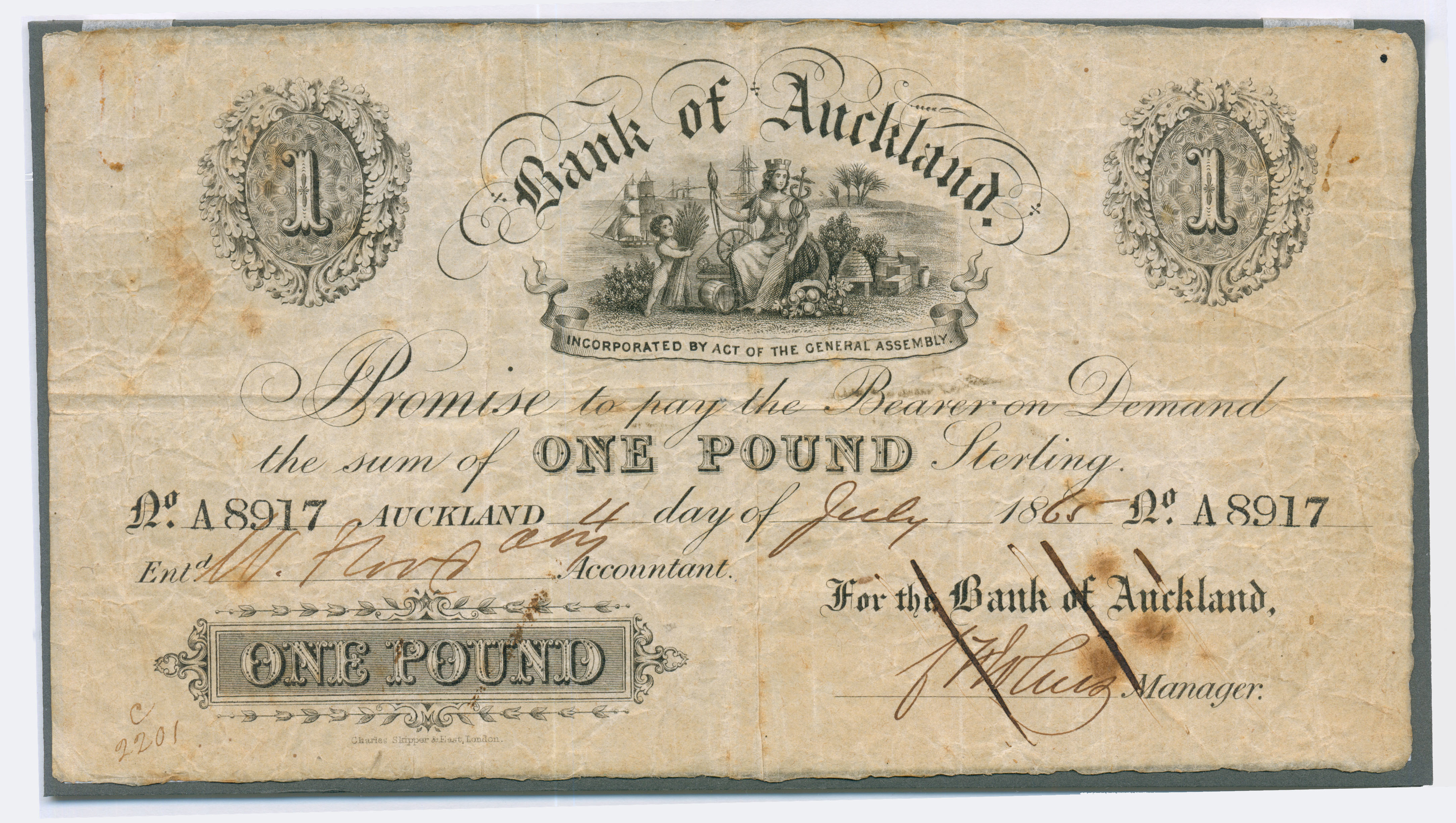
One pound note 4 July 1865 signed C F Johns

Bank of Auckland was an Auckland, New Zealand note-issuing bank which took up deposits, made loans and was entitled to deal in precious metals but was not permitted to purchase real estate except to carry on its proper business. Its business focus was on Auckland Province.

Bank of Auckland operated at The Banking House on the corner of Auckland's O'Connell and Shortland Streets for almost three years from 11 July 1864 until its collapse reported on 1 April 1867. It was incorporated under the Bank of Auckland Act 1864. The capital was raised by public subscription to form a local provincial (i.e. Auckland Province) bank.

The first directors when the company shares were promoted to the public were reported to be: James O'Neill (President), Henry Isaacs, David Nathan, G. M. O'Rorke, and Allan K. Taylor and the Manager was Charles F. Johns. Both O'Neill and Nathan were directors of the Bank of New Zealand. Mr Nathan was an original shareholder but did not take up a seat on the board of the new bank.

A few days after its collapse the four other banks then operating in Auckland: Union Bank of Australia, Bank of New South Wales, Bank of New Zealand and Bank of Australasia agreed to take up the bank's business and discharge the bank's liabilities.

== Market share ==
The bank had less than 4% of the country's banking business in the quarter ending 30 June 1866.
