= Colesberg Bank =

South African bank

Colesberg Bank was a South African bank established in 1861 and acquired by Standard Bank in 1863.

== Formation ==
The decision to establish the Colesberg Bank was taken at a public meeting held on 28 December 1860 at Colesberg. Mr. L.J. von Maltitz chaired the meeting and Mr. George Edington acted as Secretary. The motion to establish the bank was proposed by Mr. J.H. Davies and was seconded by Mr. R. A. Green and unanimously agreed to by those present.

The following were selected to form a Committee "for the purpose of carrying out this scheme": Henry Green – Civil Commissioner for the District, L.J. von Maltitz, Richard Thomson, Charles Wheatley Mathews, R. A. Green, James Murray, A. A. Ortlepp, S Roos, and Thomas Draper.

== Capitalisation ==
A total of 1,250 shares were issued at £20 each giving an initial capitalisation of £25,000. Payment for shares was staggered, being £1 at allotment, £2 three months after allotment, £2 after six months etc.

== Shareholding and voting rights ==
It was proposed that no shareholder be allowed to hold more than 50 shares and that the proportion of votes be as follows:

Shares	Votes
5	1
10	2
20	3
35	4
50	5

== Directors ==
The initial Directors of the bank were chosen by ballot on 16 May 1861 and Messrs. H Green and Bedford Jnr. were appointed scrutineers. The results were as follows:

Nominee	Votes
Henry Green C.C.	141
P. von Maltitz	135
Richard Thomson	130
R. A. Green	106
Charles Wheatley Mathews	98
Thomas Draper Jnr.	73
A. A. Ortlepp	70

Henry Green was hereafter elected Chairman of the Bank by the Directors.

== Premises ==
In June 1861 it was decided to buy the property of Mr. R. A. Green in Reyneveld Street for £900, payable in two installments at six and twelve months, bearing an interest rate of six percent per annum as of 1 July 1861 when occupation was taken.

On 23 September 1861, a Building Committee comprising Messrs. H. Green and Thomson were appointed to meet with the architect Mr. Welchman and to explain to him the wishes of the Board regarding new Buildings.

== Investment options ==
At a meeting held on 1 July 1861 the Board decided that the following rates of interest would be offered:

Period	Interest Rate (%/annum)
For 3 months + under 6 months	3
For 6 months + under 12 months	4
For 12 months	5
For 12 months with notice of 3 months	6

== Operations ==
The first record of operations is recorded for 15 July 1861 and a total of £2,384.5.4 in bills were presented before the board for discount.

Operating hours were set from 10 o’clock a.m. until 3 o’clock p.m. during the week, and from 9 o'clock a.m. until 1 o'clock p.m. on Saturdays.

== Bank notes ==
An initial run of bank notes were printed by Saul Solomon & Co., Printers in Cape Town and a £5 cancelled note signed by R. Thomson and R.A. Green, issued on 24 October 1861 is known to exist at the Gallery and Heritage Centre - Standard Bank of South Africa in Simmonds Street Johannesburg.

Other notes include a rare £4 note issued on 30 January 1862 and signed by Thomas Draper Jr. and R.A. Green as well as a £5 note signed by C.W. Mathews and Thomas Draper Jr. on 23 January 1862. The latter notes were printed by William Brown & Co. Sc 40 & 41, Old Broad St. London, who were represented locally by Ewan Christian of Cape Town.

Between 1822 and 1891 the issue by firms and individuals of notes for less than R50 or £3.15.0 was forbidden by law which led to several Private Cape Banks issuing £4 pound notes as the smallest denomination.

Other known locations where notes are kept include the MuseuMAfricA in Johannesburg and the Institute of Bankers of South Africa.

== Incorporation ==
The Colesberg Bank was incorporated into the Standard Bank of South Africa in 1863 with five Standard Bank shares worth £25 paid for twelve Colesberg Bank shares worth £10. This was at a premium of 3s. 4d. per share.
