= Yellow corydalis =

Yellow corydalis is a common name for several plants and may refer to:

- Corydalis flavula, native to the United States
- Corydalis lutea, native to Italy and Switzerland
