= Putney Park Lane =

Unmade road and public park in London, United Kingdom

Coordinates: 51.4608403°N 0.2171152°W

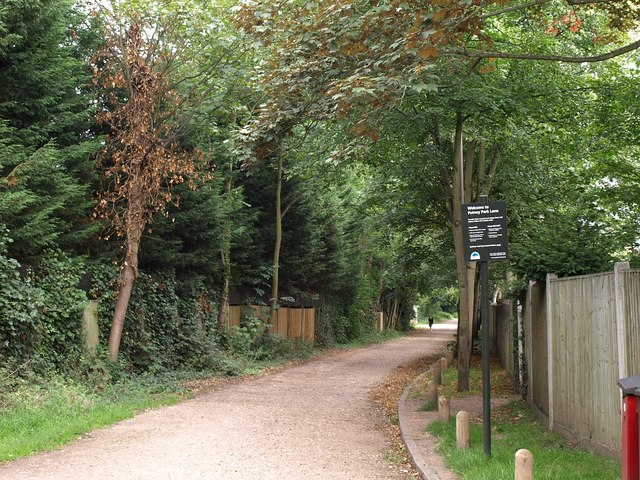
Putney Park Lane from the south

Putney Park Lane is an unmade road and public urban park in the London Borough of Wandsworth between Putney and Roehampton town centres.

== Geography ==
The lane is an unmade road owned and managed by Wandsworth Borough Council, it is gated at both ends and runs alongside a public road with the same name. It spans from Upper Richmond road at the north end to Putney Heath at the south end and is 1,683 metres long, with an area of 0.9ha. The lane is in the Wandsworth Archaeological Priority Area and runs along the edge of the Dover House Estate Conservation Area.

== History ==
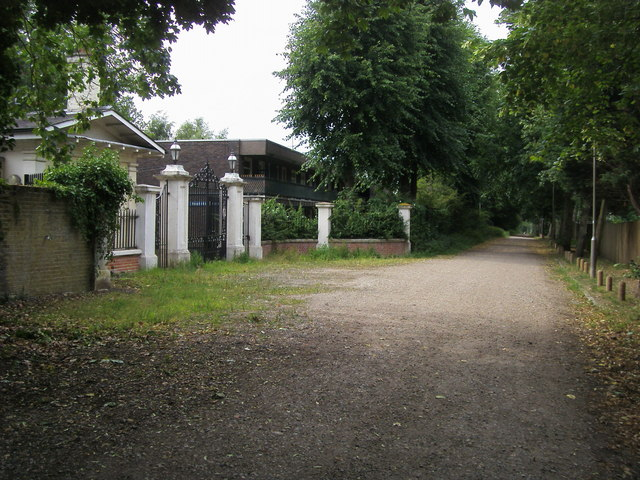
Former house Entrance on Putney Park Lane

Putney Park Lane dates from the 18th century, its entrance lodges at the gates to the Upper Richmond Road and Putney Heath still stand and there are remnants of other former entrances along the lane. The Putney Park estate was a large working deer park first recorded in archives in 1274, the house of which is thought to have been on The Pleasance area which the lane bends around

== Features ==
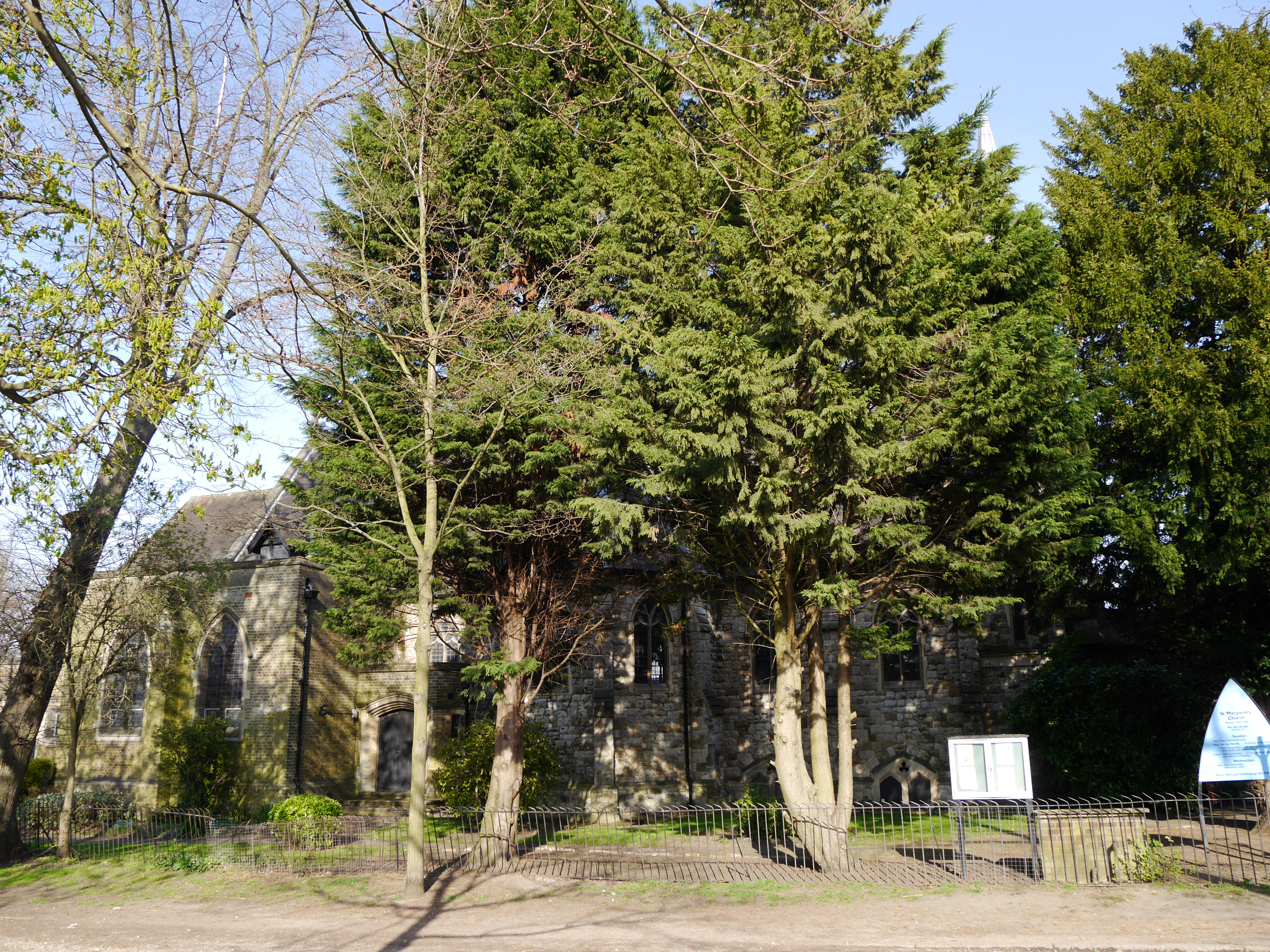
St Margaret's Church from Putney Park Lane

Halfway up on the east side of the Lane is St Margaret's Church, a former Baptist and then Presbyterian chapel, which was consecrated into the Church of England in 1912. In 2021 the lane area by the church will be restored to prevent flooding.

In The Pleasance there is a natural playground including logs, stepping stones and swings.

== Wildlife ==
The Lane is a Site of Local Importance for Nature Conservation and provides a wildlife corridor between Putney Heath and the Putney Lower Common area.

There are mature trees and large Hollies and the grassland areas have a variety of wayside flowers such as pellitory-of-the-wall and yellow corydalis, there is also regenerating elm scrub where the rare white-letter hairstreak butterfly has been recorded. In The Pleasance area stag beetles and hedgehogs have been recorded.

== Transport ==
The park is served by Transport for London buses 74, 85, 170, 337, 424 which stop on the Upper Richmond road or Putney Heath, Barnes railway station (Southwestern Railway) is a 10 minute walk from the north gate of the lane.

There is an ubitricity electric car charging station on Cortis road, on the eastern side of the Lane.
