= Banknotes of the Chartered Bank of India, Australia and China (Perak) =

Banknotes were issued by the Chartered Bank of India, Australia and China at its Taiping, Perak branch from 1859 until 1890. These notes, which are very scarce are inscribed 'Post Bill'. Taiping's name is spelt as 'THAIPING'. These notes have the British coat of arms at the top with the inscription 'INCORPORATED BY ROYAL CHARTER' above it. The notes all measure 200 x 120 mm.

== 5 dollars ==
- CTP1. Black-brown border on white paper with a yellow underprint and brown coat of arms on front. Green pattern with '5' in each corner and the bank's name in the centre in a lozenge-shaped border.

== 10 dollars ==
- CTP2. Blue and black border on white paper with a green underprint and blue coat of arms on front. Olive-green pattern with '10' in each corner and the bank's name in the centre in a lozenge-shaped border.
