= African Banking Corporation =

British overseas bank

- Company type: Consortium bank
- Industry: Banking
- Founded: 1890
- Founders: Lloyds Bank; National Provincial Bank; Westminster Bank; Standard Bank of South Africa
- Fate: Acquired and merged into Standard Bank of South Africa in 1920
- Headquarters: London, United Kingdom
- Area served: British colonies in Africa
- Products: Commercial banking

The African Banking Corporation was a British overseas bank; its headquarters were in London but all its branches were overseas. Unusually, it was a consortium bank (i.e., other banks jointly owned it), rather than being owned by individuals. It operated primarily in South Africa. In 1920 the bank was bought out and merged with Standard Bank of South Africa.

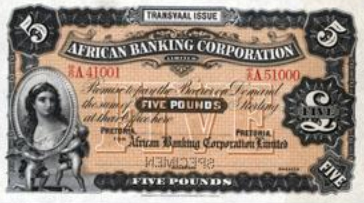
African Banking Corporation bank note issued between 1900 and 1920 in the Transvaal

== History ==
- In 1890 Lloyds Bank, National Provincial, Westminster, and Standard Bank of South Africa established the African Banking Corporation (ABC). ABC began its operations with a branch in Lagos, Nigeria.
- In 1891 ABC acquired a number of banks in South Africa : Western Province Bank (est. 1847), Kaffrarian Colonial Bank (est. 1862), and Worcester Commercial Bank (est. 1850). That same year, it also established a branch in Tangier.
- In 1892 ABC took over the banking operations in Lagos, Nigeria of shipping company Elder Dempster. George Neville of Elder Dempster became the branch manager, but within a year ABC wished to withdraw from Lagos.
- In 1893 ABC sold its branch in Lagos to the newly created Bank of British West Africa (BBWA), established by A.L. Jones and Elder Dempster.
- In 1894 ABC transferred the branches in Lagos and Tangier to BBWA.
- In 1900, or possibly shortly thereafter, ABC established an agency in New York.
- In 1915 ABC established a branch in Lüderitz Bay, South-West Africa, as South Africa took over German South-West Africa, but closed it the next year.
- In 1920 ABC opened a branch in Windhoek, South-West Africa, but later that year Standard Bank of South Africa acquired ABC.
