= Banknotes of the Military Authority in Tripolitania =

Banknotes were issued in 1943 by the British Army for circulation in Tripolitania. The main feature of the notes is depiction of a lion standing on the King's Crown. The notes are inscribed in both Arabic and English.

The currency that these notes are expressed in is the Military Authority Lira, which was notionally divided into 100 Centesimi.

== Catalogue ==
- PM1a. 1 Lira. ND. (1943). Green. Issued banknote.
- PM1s. 1 Lira. ND. (1943). Green. Specimen banknote.
- PM2a. 2 Lire. ND. (1943). Blue on a green underprint. Issued banknote.
- PM2s. 2 Lire. ND. (1943). Blue on a green underprint. Specimen banknote.
- PM3a. 5 Lire. ND. (1943). Green on a red-brown underprint. Issued banknote.
- PM3s. 5 Lire. ND. (1943). Green on a red-brown underprint. Specimen banknote.
- PM4a. 10 Lire. ND. (1943). Lilac on a green underprint. Issued banknote.
- PM4s. 10 Lire. ND. (1943). Lilac on a green underprint. Specimen banknote.
- PM5a. 50 Lire. ND. (1943). Brown. Issued banknote.
- PM5s. 50 Lire. ND. (1943). Brown. Specimen banknote.
- PM6a. 100 Lire. ND. (1943). Red-orange on a blue underprint. Issued banknote.
- PM6s. 100 Lire. ND. (1943). Red-orange on a blue underprint. Specimen banknote.
- PM7a. 500 Lire. ND. (1943). Green on a blue underprint. Issued banknote.
- PM7s. 500 Lire. ND. (1943). Green on a blue underprint. Specimen banknote.
- PM8a. 1,000 Lire. ND. (1943). Blue on a brown underprint. Issued banknote.
- PM8s. 1,000 Lire. ND. (1943). Blue on a brown underprint. Specimen banknote.
