= Chartered Bank of India, Australia and China =

London bank, 1853–1969

The Chartered Bank of India, Australia and China
- Industry: Banking
- Founded: 1853; 173 years ago
- Founder: James Wilson with a royal charter
- Defunct: 1969
- Fate: Merged with Standard Bank
- Successor: Standard Chartered
- Headquarters: United Kingdom

The Chartered Bank of India, Australia and China (informally The Chartered Bank; Chinese: 印度新金山中國渣打銀行) was a bank incorporated in London in 1853 by Scotsman James Wilson, under a Royal Charter from Queen Victoria.

Though lacking a truly strong domestic network in Britain, it was influential in the development of British colonial trade throughout the East of Suez.

In 1969, Chartered Bank merged with Standard Bank, which did business throughout Africa. The merged enterprise was incorporated in London under the name Standard Chartered.

== History ==
=== Early years: 1853 to 1900 ===
The Chartered Bank of India, Australia and China—a bank incorporated in London, was founded in 1853 in London by James Wilson; following the grant of a Royal Charter from Queen Victoria.

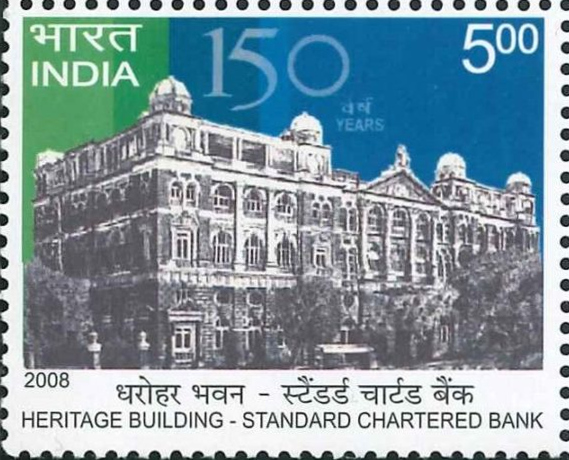
A 2008 stamp dedicated to the 150th anniversary of the Standard Chartered Bank of India

In 1858, it opened its first branches in Calcutta, Bombay and Shanghai. The bank's operations were expanded to Hong Kong and Singapore in 1859, followed by Karachi in 1863. Chartered Bank was keen to capitalise on the huge expansion of trade between India and China and other British possessions in Asia; and the handsome profits that could be made from financing the movement of goods from Europe to Far East. It competed with the other great British banks of that time—Oriental Bank Corporation, the Hongkong & Shanghai Bank and Mercantile Bank of India, London and China.

The Shanghai branch of Chartered Bank began operation in August 1858. Initially, the bank's business dealt specifically with large volume discounting and re-discounting of opium and cotton bills. Although there was a gradual rise in opium cultivation in China, the imports of opium still increased from 50,087 picul in 1863 to 82,61 picul by 1888. Transactions in the opium trade generated substantial profits for Chartered Bank. Later, the Chartered Bank also became one of the principal foreign banknote-issuing institutions in Shanghai.

In 1859, the bank opened a branch in Hong Kong and an agency in Singapore. In 1861, the Singapore agency was upgraded to a branch. In 1862, the bank was authorised to issue bank notes in Hong Kong; a privilege it continues to exercise (as Standard Chartered) to this day. Over the following decades, it printed bank notes in China and Malaya. With the opening of the Suez Canal in 1869; and completion of Indo-European telegraph line from London to Calcutta, and its extension to China in 1871; placed most British banks (including Chartered Bank) to expand and develop its business.

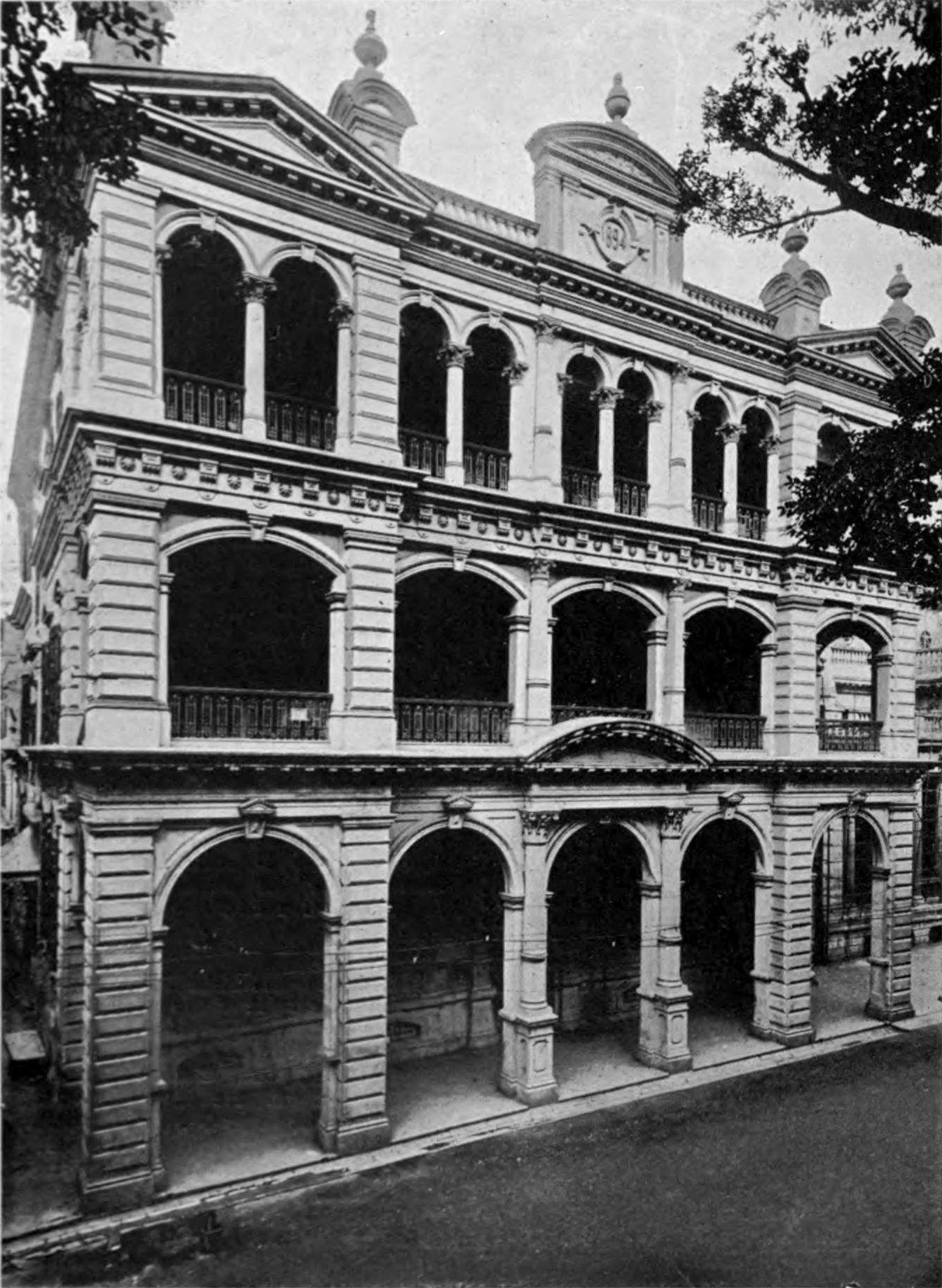
Former Hong Kong branch c.1908

=== Expansion and transition to a merger: 1900 to 1969 ===
The bank's expansion continued to the 1900s, leading it to open branches across Asia. The bank's traditional business was in cotton from Bombay, indigo and tea from Calcutta, rice from Burma, sugar from Java, tobacco from Sumatra, hemp from Manila and silk from Yokohama.

In the early 1900s, the bank opened offices in New York and Hamburg. When it established its New York branch in 1912, Chartered Bank became the first foreign bank to be issued a licence to operate in New York.

In 1923 the Great Kanto earthquake destroyed Chartered Bank's office in Yokohama, Japan, and killed a number of its staff.

In 1927 the bank acquired P&O Bank, which had offices in Colombo, Shanghai, Hong Kong, Singapore, and Guangzhou (Canton). P&O Bank also owned Allahabad Bank. The operations of P&O Bank were merged with Chartered Bank. But Allahabad Bank continued to be run as a separate entity.

The bank was greatly affected by the Second World War.

Their UK office had an established sports ground in East Molesey in Surrey, which included an active rugby club. The site had once been a large country estate and the house known as the ‘Wilderness’. It was demolished when the park was developed into a high-class residential estate in 1876. The new ‘Wilderness’ was a red brick house, built in 1881 in Jacobean style. In 1929 the house, together with the land on the other side of the river Mole, was laid out as a sports ground, firstly for the Distillers Company, and then for the construction group Trollope & Colls. Later the estate became the sports ground of the Standard Chartered Bank. A disastrous fire gutted the house in 1983. The ground was sold for housing development and their sports club closed.

In 1957, the bank acquired Eastern Bank, giving Chartered a network of branches in Aden, Bahrain, Lebanon, Qatar and the UAE. Chartered also bought the Ionian Bank's Cyprus Branches.

In 1964, the government of Indonesia nationalised Chartered Bank's branch as a part of Konfrontasi. The branch was later merged into Bank Umum Negara, a state-owned bank. Bank Umum Negara then evolved into present-day Bank Mandiri.

In 1969, Chartered Bank merged with the South African bank Standard Bank, forming Standard Chartered. The same year, the Government of India nationalised Allahabad Bank.

== See also ==
- Banknotes of the Hong Kong dollar
- Banknotes of the Chartered Bank of India, Australia and China (Perak)
- Standard Chartered
- Mercantile Bank of India, London and China
- The Hongkong and Shanghai Banking Corporation
