= Standard Bank (historic) =

Former British overseas bank

Standard Bank of British South Africa Limited
- Company type: Public
- Industry: Banking
- Founded: London, United Kingdom (15 October 1862)
- Defunct: 1969
- Fate: Merged with Chartered Bank
- Successor: Standard Chartered

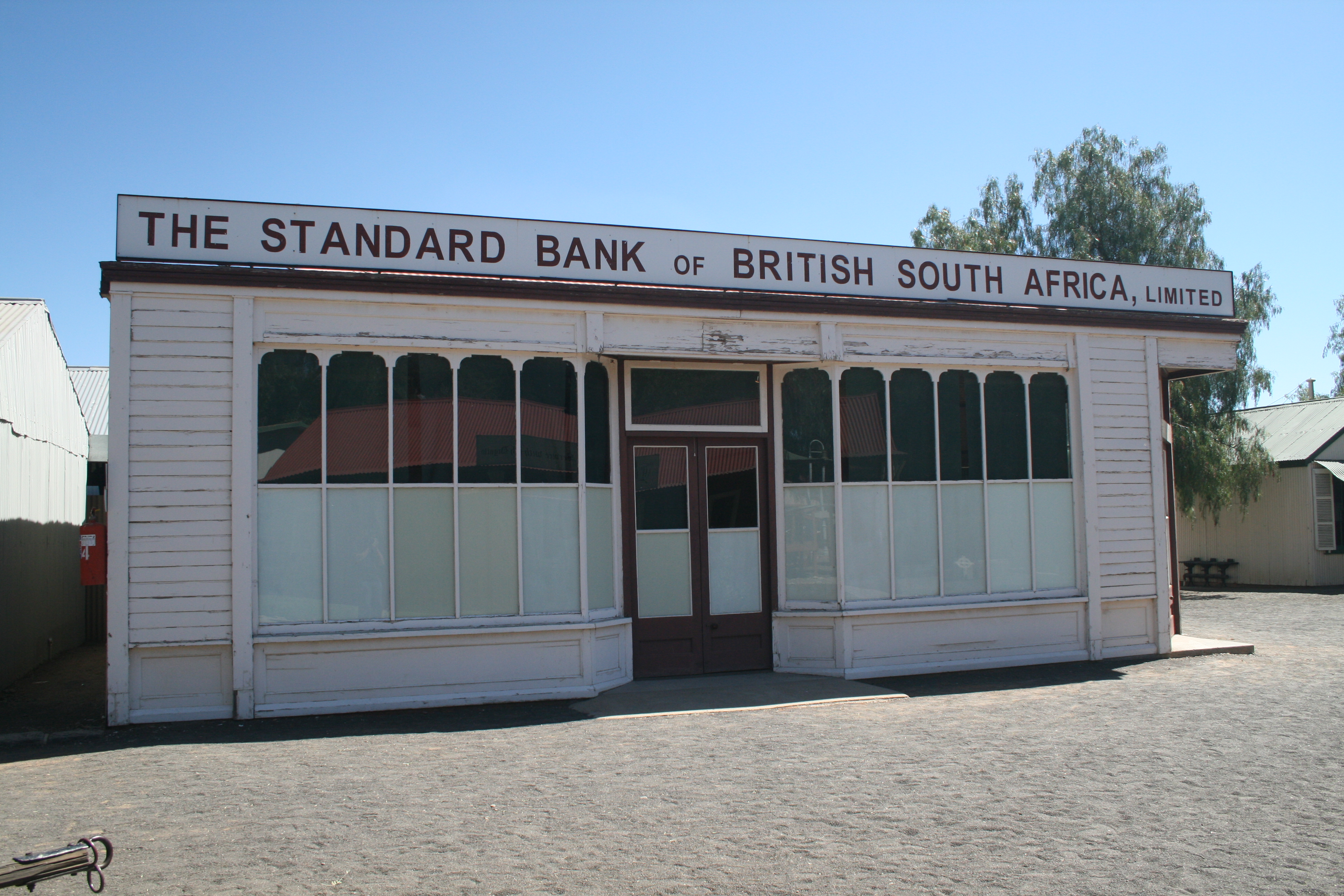
Standard Bank of British South Africa in the museum town at the Kimberley Big Hole

The Standard Bank was a British overseas bank, which operated mainly in Africa from 1863 to 1969. It merged with the Chartered Bank in 1969 to form Standard Chartered.

== History ==
The bank was incorporated in London on 15 October 1862 as Standard Bank of British South Africa. It was formed by a group of South African businessmen led by John Paterson. The bank started operations in 1863 in Port Elizabeth, South Africa, and soon after opening it merged with several other banks including the Commercial Bank of Port Elizabeth, the Colesberg Bank, the British Kaffrarian Bank and the Fauresmith Bank.

It was prominent in financing and development of the diamond fields of Kimberley in 1867.

In reflection to the growth of its branch network and expansion outside British controlled regions, the bank dropped the word "British" from its title and adopted the name Standard Bank of South Africa Limited in 1881.

When gold was discovered on the Witwatersrand, the bank expanded northwards and on 11 October 1886 the bank started doing business in a tent at Ferreira's Camp (later to be called Johannesburg), thus becoming the first bank to open a branch on the Witwatersrand gold fields. It opened a second Johannesburg branch on 1 November 1901 along Eloff Street.

From the 1890s through the 1910s the bank opened offices across Africa, although some of them were unsustainable and subsequently had to be closed. In 1912 it opened a branch in New York City. In 1920 it bought out the African Banking Corporation. By the mid-1950s, Standard Bank had around 600 offices in Africa.

In 1962, the bank was renamed Standard Bank Limited, and a subsidiary was registered in South Africa under the parent bank's previous name, Standard Bank of South Africa.

In 1965, Standard Bank merged with the Bank of West Africa expanding its operations into Cameroon, Gambia, Ghana, Nigeria, and Sierra Leone.

== Merger ==
In 1969, the Standard Bank merged with Chartered Bank of India, Australia and China and the combined bank became known as Standard Chartered Bank.

== Subsequent use of name ==
In South Africa, the Standard Bank Investment Corporation (now Standard Bank Group) was established as the holding company of The Standard Bank of South Africa Limited. Standard Chartered sold its remaining 39% stake in Standard Bank Group in 1987, and the two banking groups are now under quite separate ownership. Today, the Standard Bank name is used by the South African group, which has expanded outside South Africa, including forming a subsidiary in the United Kingdom known as Standard Bank London.

The original 1862 company changed its name in 1985 from Standard Bank PLC to Standard Chartered Bank Africa PLC, and is now named Standard Chartered Africa Ltd.
