= 1980s in Hong Kong =

1980s in Hong Kong marks a period when the territory was known for its wealth and trademark lifestyle. It remained a colony at the beginning of the decade in 1980, and transitioned into a dependent territory of the United Kingdom in 1981, becoming among its last significant colonial territories, also being the richest out of all British dependent territories at the time and most populated with over 5 million people. During this period, Hong Kong would be recognised internationally for its politics, entertainment and skyrocketing real estate prices. It would also go on to be the subject of intense negotiations between Britain and China, which would be resolved in the Sino-British Joint Declaration.

== Background ==
After being made a crown colony in 1843, the status of Hong Kong was changed effectively under the British Nationality Act 1981 enacted by the British Parliament, which came into force on 1 January 1983. The Act renamed all existing British colonies to dependent territories (similar to a current overseas territory) upon the independence of the remaining major colonies, namely Southern Rhodesia and Belize.

The renaming did not change how the government operated. Still, it affected the nationality status of Hong Kong's then over 5 million inhabitants, most of whom were to become British Dependent Territory citizens. This status could no longer be transmitted by descent.

Regardless of the competing claims for sovereignty, China's paramount leader Deng Xiaoping recognised that Hong Kong, with its free market economy, could not be assimilated into the People's Republic overnight and that any attempt to do so would not be in the interests of either. He advocated a more pragmatic approach known as the one country, two systems policy, in which Hong Kong (as well as Macau, and potentially also Taiwan) would be able to retain their economic systems within the PRC. On 19 December 1984, the Sino-British Joint Declaration on the Question of Hong Kong (The Joint Declaration) was signed between the PRC and UK governments. Under this agreement, Hong Kong would cease to be a British Dependent Territory on 1 July 1997 and would thenceforth be a Special Administrative Region (SAR) of the PRC. Citizens who were opposed to the handover and had the means to leave led to the first wave of emigration.

== Demographics ==
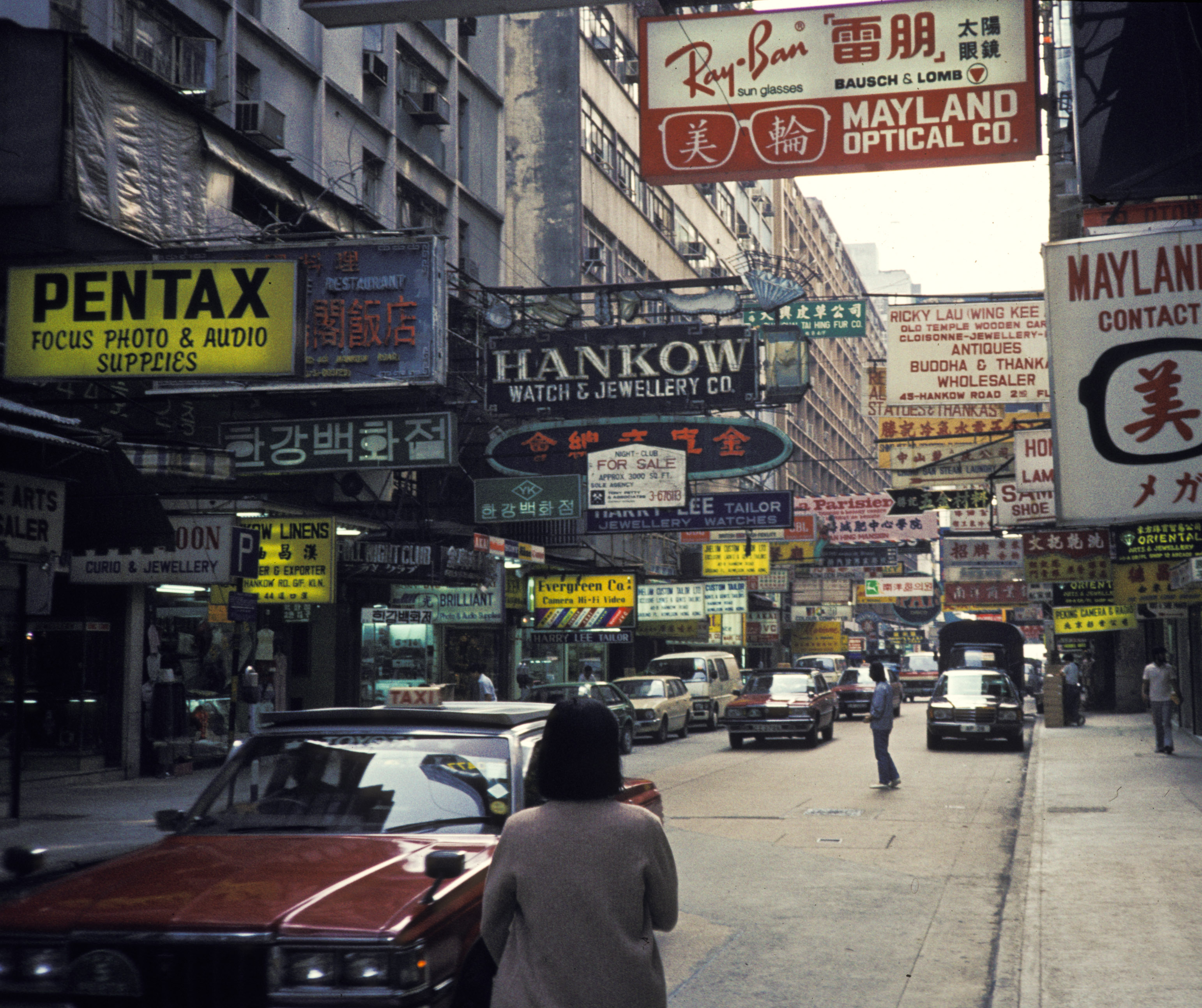
A view of Hankow Road, Tsim Sha Tsui, in 1982

=== Population ===
Hong Kong's population topped five million just at the beginning of the 1980s, and rose at an annual average rate of 1.3% over the next ten years. The additional 700,000 residents raised the population to 5.73 million at the end of the decade. The population of females rose 1.5% per annum, faster than that for males (1.4% p.a.), although females would remain a minority until 1996. Upon the independence of Southern Rhodesia as Zimbabwe in 1980, Hong Kong became the largest colony by population for the United Kingdom at the time.

The decade also saw the first signs of population ageing, as the number of residents under the age of 25 fell by 1.2%. Households shrank in size from an average of 4.01 occupants in 1982 (the earliest available data) to 3.67 at decade's end. The 1980s were also characterised by the lowest population increase due to net migration (30.1%), as opposed to natural expansion.

=== Immigration and emigration ===
From 1978 to September 1980, nearly 23,000 illegal immigrants from Mainland China entered Hong Kong. The government abolished the "touch-base" policy on 23 October 1980. After this date, any illegal immigrants captured would be sent back to their originating countries immediately. There were public outcries in the early 1980s over decreasing wages due to the large influx of mainland immigrants raising supply against demand.

On the other hand, citizens of Hong Kong were beginning to emigrate to the UK, Canada and United States in large numbers due to the uncertainty of the handover in 1997. From 1980 to 1986, an estimated 21,000 people left Hong Kong permanently every year. Beginning in 1987, the numbers rose sharply to 48,000 people a year.

== Culture ==
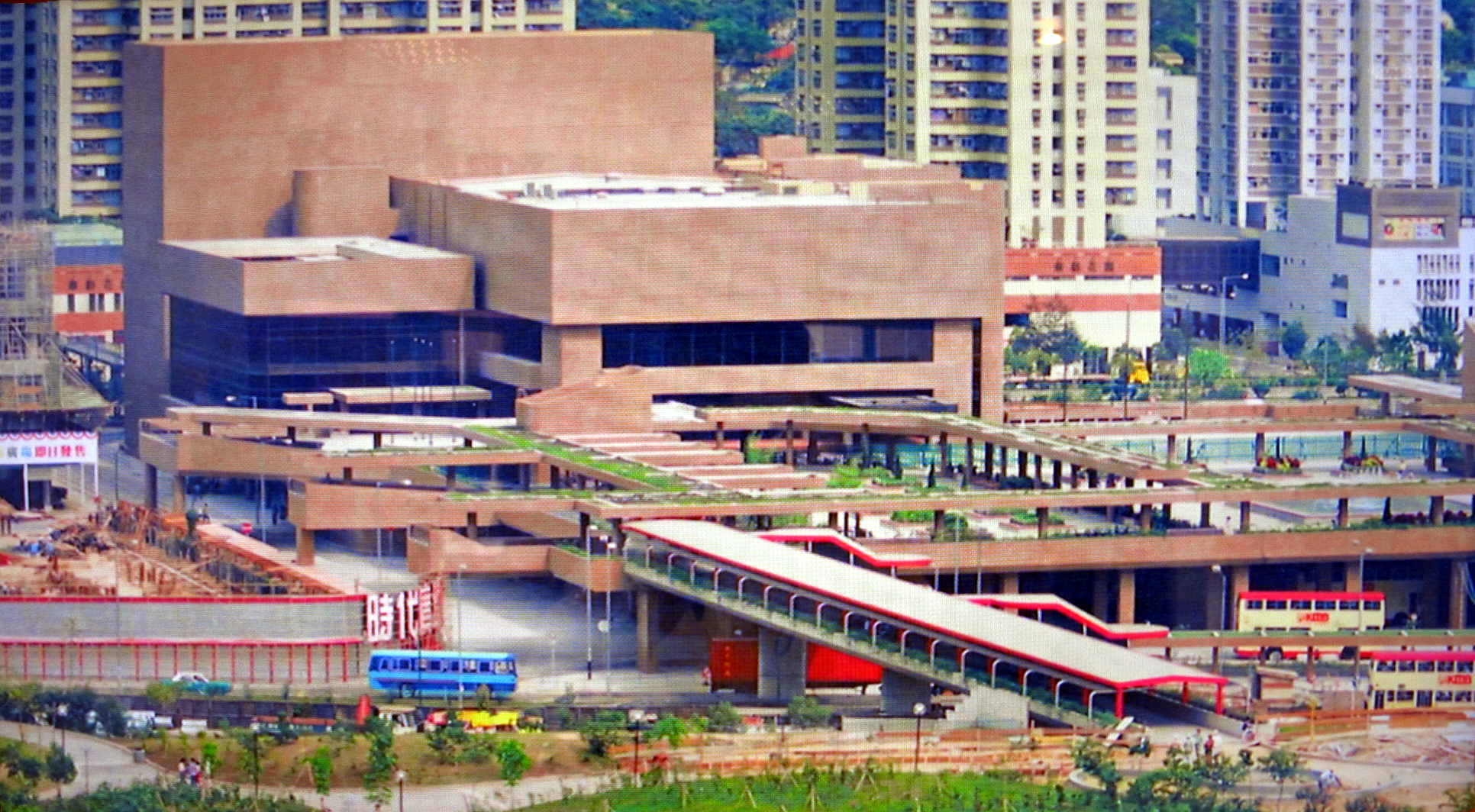
Tuen Mun Town Hall, a performing arts centre opened in 1987

=== Education ===
In the early 1980s, Hong Kong's education system could only accommodate 2% of the youth who wanted to seek higher education. It was not until 1989 that the government decided to expand the programmes domestically. Prior to this, it was expected that higher education should be gained abroad.

Two special institutes opened to train young athletes and performers, respectively. The Jubilee Sports Centre opened in 1982 while the Hong Kong Academy for Performing Arts was founded in 1984 to educate students of the performing arts, music, and related technical professions.

=== Entertainment ===
The mid-1980s saw the popularising of the Walkman. It was one of the key factors in contributing to the rise of the cantopop culture. Leslie Cheung, Anita Mui and Alan Tam were among the biggest pop stars. Other shows related to Super Sentai and Transformers were translated and broadcast regularly. The franchising of toy stores such as Toys "R" Us flooded the malls of Hong Kong. Japanese import stores like Sogo in Causeway Bay also made Hello Kitty a cultural icon.

The performing arts received a boost in the 1980s with the opening of numerous new Urban Council performance venues including the Tsuen Wan Town Hall (1980), Tuen Mun Town Hall (1987), Sha Tin Town Hall (1987), Hong Kong Cultural Centre (1989) and Sheung Wan Civic Centre (1989).

=== Cinema ===
Domestic movies in the 1980s would put Hong Kong cinema on the international map. Jackie Chan was recognized for his acrobatic displays and his stunts, along with his Peking Opera friends, who were also some of the heaviest hitters in the industry, Yuen Biao and Sammo Hung. Hong Kong stunts were some of the greatest trademarks the industry had. The comedy genres were also popular with actors such as Michael Hui, Richard Ng, Eric Tsang, and John Shum. Chow Yun-fat was known for his collaborations with John Woo which set the standard for triad films like A Better Tomorrow and The Killer. Some of the most famous movies of the decade were films like Police Story, A Better Tomorrow, Aces Go Places, Winners & Sinners, and Project A.

=== Natural disasters ===
In the 1980s, there were 10 Typhoons which had a signal of number 8 and 1 Typhoon 10, The 3 worst typhoons were Typhoon Ellen, Typhoon Gordon and Typhoon Joe. The longest typhoon 8 was Severe Tropical Storm Lynn which had Typhoon 8 status for 28 hours and 45 Minutes.

== Politics ==
=== Reforms ===
Major democratic reform began in 1984. Following the historic meeting in 1979 between Deng Xiaoping and then governor Murray MacLehose, a Green Paper: the Further Development of Representative Government in Hong Kong was issued by the colonial government in July 1984. It included proposals aimed at developing a system of more localised government, which included the introduction of indirect elections to the LegCo (Legislative Council) the following year. The Sino-British Joint Declaration stated that "the legislature of the [Hong Kong Special Administrative Region] shall be constituted by elections"; then British Foreign Secretary Geoffrey Howe further promised the democratic process would start "in the years immediately ahead", but they stalled due to opposition from Beijing, local business interests as represented by Executive Council, and the British Foreign Office under the pretext that it would bring chaos to Hong Kong. Declaring that "full weight be given to representation of the economic and professional sectors essential to future confidence and prosperity of Hong Kong", the government proposed 12 seats of the Legislative Council were to be elected the following year. Martin Lee and Szeto Wah, later to become leading democrats, were among those elected in 1985.

Democracy activists – pressure groups, religious groups and community organisations – attended a mass rally at Ko Shan Theatre in Hung Hom in November 1986. The rally was a milestone in Hong Kong's fledgling pro-democracy movement. One of the participating groups, calling themselves the 'group of 190', demanded direct elections for LegCo in 1988, and a faster pace of democratic development after the Handover.

In 1987, many surveys indicated that there was more than 60% popular support for direct elections. The government, under governor David Wilson, issued another green paper in 1987 proposing direct LegCo elections for 1988. However, the proposal was ruled out after a government consultation concluded that people were 'sharply divided' over its introduction that year.

=== Tiananmen Square protests ===
In 1989, following the death of Hu Yaobang and the spread of nationwide protests in China, Hong Kong witnessed an unprecedented wave of political movements. Students, professionals, journalists, religious groups, unions, and artists organized marches, petitions, hunger strikes, and fundraising campaigns to support Beijing and mainland protesters.

In May 1989, public participation reached historic levels. On May 21, "one million Hong Kong citizens participated in a parade which lasted for eight hours in support for the mainland students", and the Hong Kong Alliance in Support of Patriotic Democratic Movements of China was formed. On May 27, the Concert for Democracy in China raised HK$12 million. The next day, another massive demonstration was held with 1.5 million participants.

The massacre in Tiananmen Square on 4 June 1989 shocked the public. More than one million residents demonstrated to express their sorrow, with citywide strikes and memorial vigils. Public confidence in China's promise of "one country, two systems" collapsed sharply. These events permanently reshaped Hong Kong's political landscapes, fueling distrust towards Chinese central government and localism.

== Economy ==
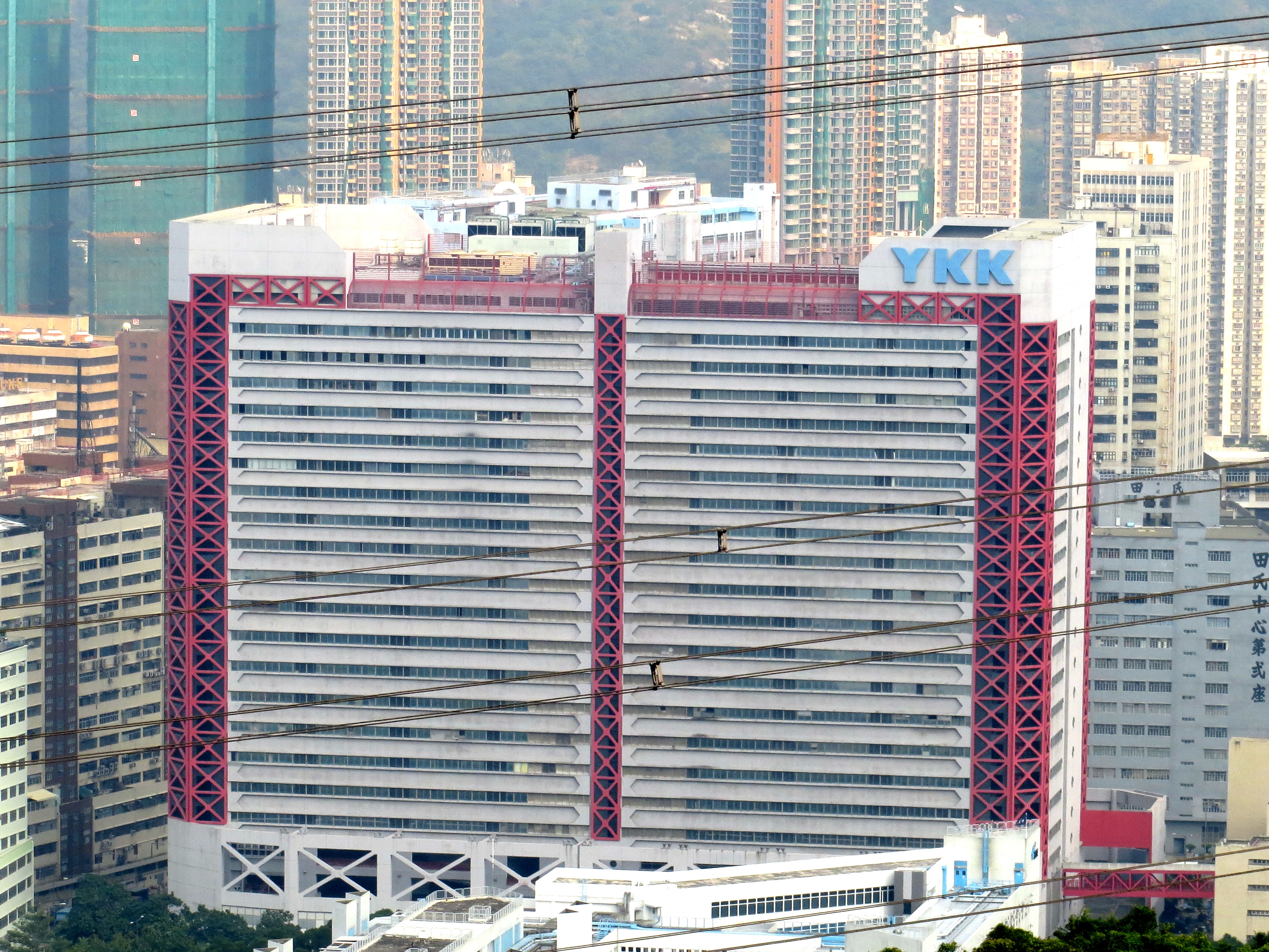
A flatted factory building in Tuen Mun, completed 1989

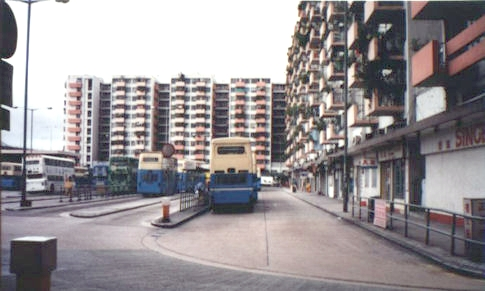
North Point Estate, 1989

=== Manufacturing ===
In the early 1980s, younger Hong Kong workers began avoiding the manufacturing industry entirely. Hong Kong's on-going evolution away from manufacturing picked up steam during the decade, as production's share of the economy fell from 22.8% in 1980 to 16.7% ten years later. Replacing it was a greater reliance on services, which rose from 68.3% to 75.4% of GDP. The fastest growing sectors were foreign trade, logistics and communications and general personal and community services. The lack of investment in domestic industry, along with China's reform and opening up, began opening up manufacturing to the mainland. Middle-aged men and women who had spent decades in manufacturing were suddenly left with no place to go.

=== Real estate ===
In 1960, the University of Hong Kong and Hong Kong Technical College were one of the first schools to offer real estate education, but the curriculum was considered a sub program. In 1981, the University of Hong Kong became the first institution to be accredited by the RICS. It was the first step in connecting real estate education and the industry itself. By 1983, 61% of capital investments belonged to the real estate sector. The amount of money entering the communities for infrastructure expenses in the 1980s eclipsed the sum of all real estate investments from 1940 to 1979. An up-to-date understanding of the industry along with the high-density population provided many with the opportunity to capitalise on realty sales. Areas like Lan Kwai Fong were improving at the time and became an "alternative" or "open" avenue to attract people who wanted things to be different. If construction was not open before, many areas found themselves redeveloping.

=== Finance ===
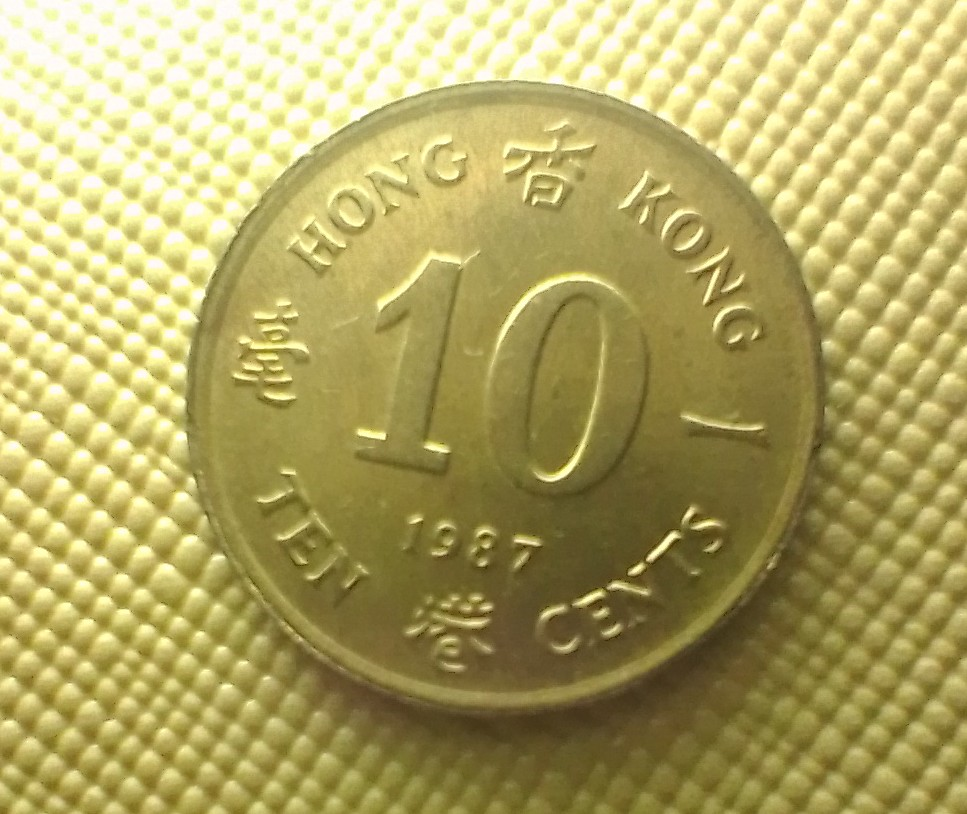
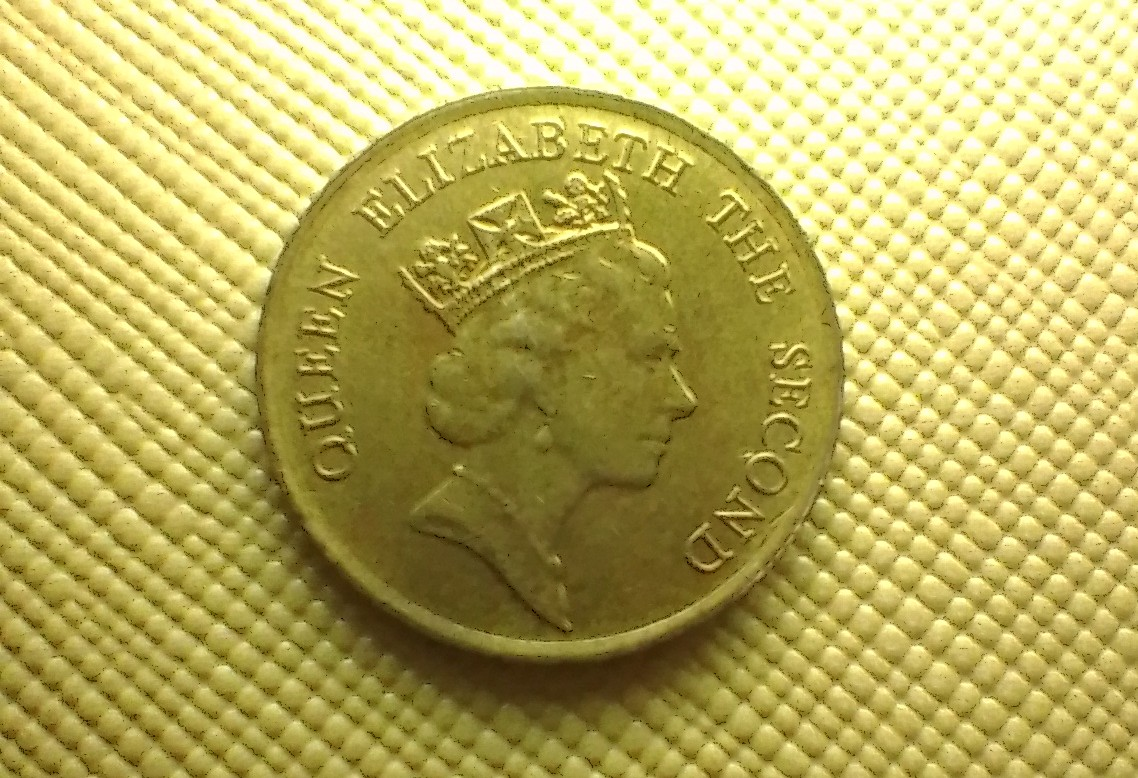
Hong Kong 10 cents of 1987 featuring Elizabeth II

The lack of foreign-exchange control, and low tax, contributed to the competitiveness of Hong Kong's economy. Though a floating rate, coupled with panic about intensified political talk of the handover, sent consumer confidence to an all-time low, causing Black Saturday in 1983. The end result was that Hong Kong adopted a linked exchange rate system. The exchange rate between the Hong Kong dollar and the United States dollar was fixed at HKD $7.8 = US$1. The Hong Kong Monetary Authority's exchange fund was responsible for keeping the market rate stable. In the short period from just a decade previously, inflation would also increase from 5% in the 1970s to 12.7% by 1983.

=== Transport ===
The Modified Initial System, the first line of the Mass Transit Railway (MTR), was officially opened by Princess Alexandra in February 1980. Over the course of the 1980s the MTR expanded rapidly. An extension to Tsuen Wan opened in 1982, while the more technically challenging Island line opened in 1986. The new metro system was instantly successful at attracting heavy patronage.

In addition, the much older Kowloon–Canton Railway (KCR) was fully modernised in the early 1980s. It was double-tracked and electrified. New stations were built to serve growing new towns and new housing estates, while many several older stations were closed. The KCR also opened a new light rail network in 1988 to link the new towns of Yuen Long and Tuen Mun.
