= Joseph Yam =

Hong Kong statistician, economist and civil servant (born 1948)

The Honourable Joseph Yam GBM, GBS, CBE, JP
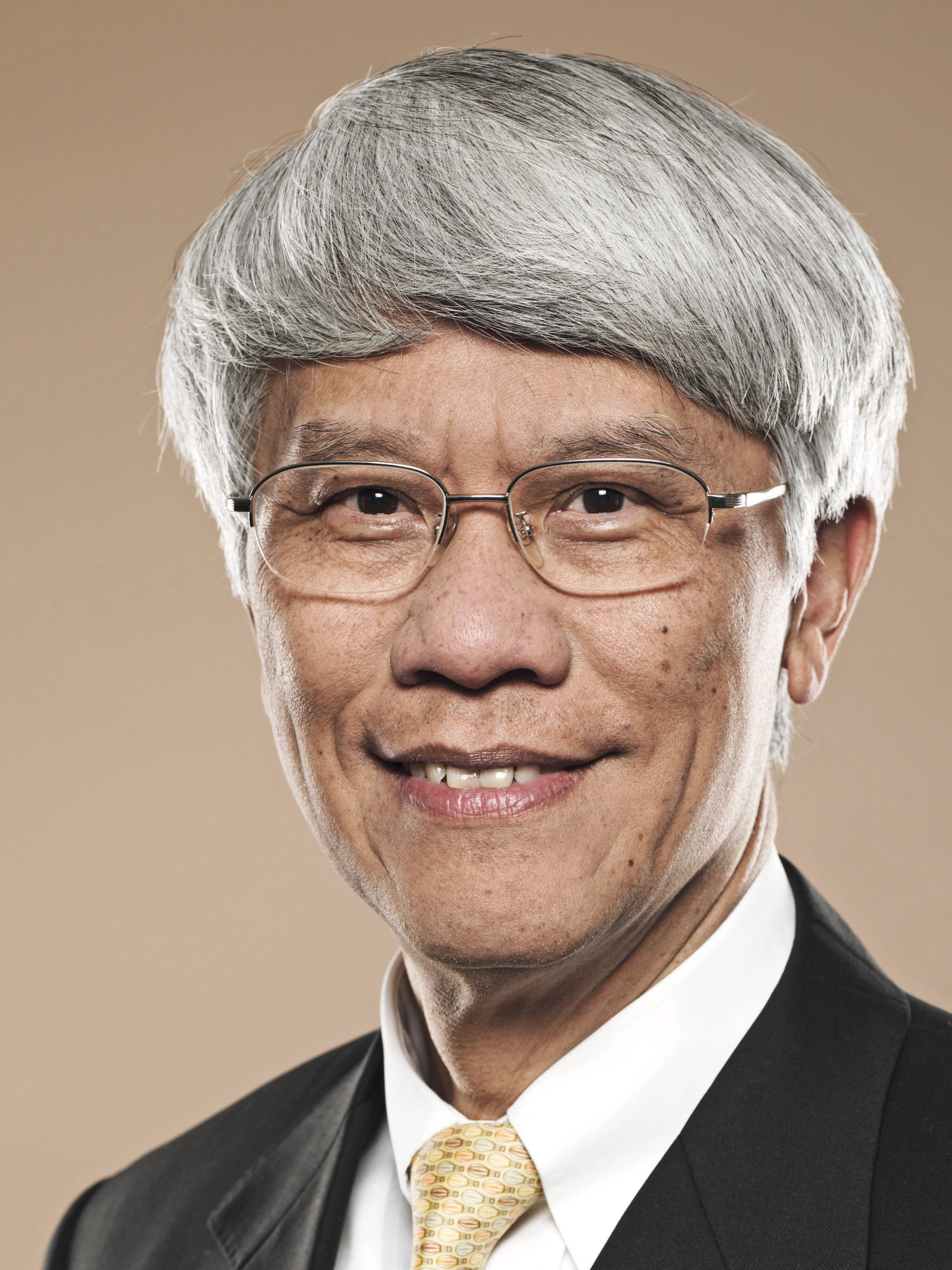

1st Chief Executive of the Hong Kong Monetary Authority
- In office 1 April 1993 – 30 September 2009
- Governor: Chris Patten
- Succeeded by: Norman Chan

1st Director of the Office of the Exchange Fund
- In office 1991–1993

Non-official Member of the Executive Council
- Incumbent
- Assumed office 1 July 2017
- Appointed by: Carrie Lam

Personal details
- Born: Joseph YAM Chi-kwong; 9 September 1948 (age 78)
- Party: none
- Education: St. Paul's College; University of Hong Kong
- Occupation: Retired
- Profession: Economist; Statistician

Joseph Yam
- Traditional Chinese: 任志剛
- Simplified Chinese: 任志刚
Transcriptions
Standard Mandarin
- Hanyu Pinyin: Rén Zhìgāng
Yue: Cantonese
- Jyutping: jam6 zi3 gong1

Joseph Yam Chi-kwong, GBM, GBS, CBE, JP (任志剛; born 1948, Hong Kong) is a Hong Kong statistician, economist and civil servant. He was the first Chief Executive of the Hong Kong Monetary Authority, Hong Kong's de facto central bank, holding the position for 16 years. In 2011 Yam was elected to a member of the board of directors of the Swiss Bank UBS AG. In 2014, following UBS AG's restructuring, he was appointed to the board of directors of the UBS Group AG and remained in the position till May 2017. He has been a member of the Corporate Culture and Responsibility Committee and the Risk Committee of the UBS Group AG since 2011 and a non-official member of the Executive Council of Hong Kong since 2017.

== Education ==
Joseph Yam graduated from the University of Hong Kong in economics, social sciences and statistics with first class honors in 1970.

== Career ==
Yam joined the Government of Hong Kong as a statistician in 1971 and became an economist in 1976. Subsequently, in 1982, Yam was appointed Principal Assistant Secretary for Monetary Affairs.

In 1983, Yam contributed to formulating the peg between the Hong Kong dollar and US dollar. In 1985, he was appointed Deputy Secretary for Monetary Affairs and in 1991, as a Director of the Office of the Exchange Fund. When the Office of the Exchange Fund merged with the Office of the Commissioner of Banking in 1993 to become the Hong Kong Monetary Authority (HKMA), Yam took the position of Chief Executive of the new body.

=== Tenure as Chief Executive of HKMA ===
Yam was Chief Executive of the Hong Kong Monetary Authority for 16 years, from its inauguration on 1 April 1993 until 30 September 2009.

In 1995, the Hong Kong Institute of Bankers voted Yam Banker of the Year.

Despite a study conducted by S. K. Tsang, a Professor of Economics in Hong Kong Baptist University, entitled "A Study of the Linked Exchange Rate System and Policy Options for Hong Kong" and indicating there were weaknesses of the HKD-USD exchange rate peg system during the 1997 Asian financial crisis, Yam did not amend the narrow-based peg, but defended the Hong Kong dollar by pushing up interest rates. In particular, Yam pushed the overnight Interbank rates up to 280% on 23 October 1997.

In an audacious move, the HKMA also bought US$15 billion in stocks amidst the market panic in 1998. The measure restored calm, and consequently succeeded to defend the Hong Kong fixed exchange rate parity against the US dollar. The move was initially criticised by, amongst others, Alan Greenspan, who voiced concern in September 1998 that the strategy would fail and erode the credibility of the HKMA. "It turned out that his timing was exquisite," Greenspan later said. "It was a risky action [which]... I wouldn't recommend as a general rule for central banks." Yam responded with an open letter, stating his disappointment and defending the decision of the HKMA.

In 2007, Yam was the highest paid central banker in the world, with an annual salary of US$1.32 million, about seven times that of the Chairman of the Federal Reserve ($191,300), and approximately three times that of the President of the European Central Bank (EUR 351,816 in 2008), the Governor of the Bank of England (GBP 290,000 in 2008) and the Governor of the Bank of Japan ($370,000 in 2007).

In 2008, Yam was summoned by a subcommittee of Legislative Council of Hong Kong in a hearing regarding issues arising from Lehman Brothers-related Minibonds and structured financial products.

==== Convergence plan ====
Noticing the pricing differential between shares listed on both the local market (H-shares) and the Shanghai Stock Exchange (A-shares), Yam pushed for mechanisms to promote greater convergence and arbitrage. Ignoring major obstacles pointed out by local brokers, he is credited with persuading the Government to take a 5.9% stake in the Hong Kong Stock Exchange as leverage, and then pushing the program which allowed mainland individuals to buy Hong Kong securities directly by opening foreign-currency accounts at the Bank of China branch in northern Tianjin. The scheme was announced by the State Administration of Foreign Exchange on 20 August 2007, but stalled at the starting gate, when Beijing refused to grant permission.

=== Retirement from public service ===
On 19 May 2009, Yam confirmed his plan to retire, having been in post for 16 years. When it was originally announced in October 2007 that he would retire on 1 October 2009, financial columnist Jake van der Kamp linked Yam's departure with his handling of the A-share and H-share plans which destabilised Hong Kong's economy.

Chief Executive Sir Donald Tsang of Hong Kong described Yam as a "comrade in arm [sic] who acted in concert with the government in 1998 to overcome the Asian financial turmoil and under the present financial tsunami, Hong Kong's banking system has remained stable."

=== UBS Group AG ===
In April 2011, Yam was elected to the board of directors of UBS AG and since 2011 he has been a member of both the Corporate Culture and Responsibility Committee and the Risk Committee. From November 2014 till May 2017, he was a member of the board of directors of UBS Group AG.

=== Views and opinions ===
In July 2022, Yam said that the Hong Kong dollar peg to the US Dollar should remain, and that if the US waged a "financial war" against China, it would be unlikely to affect Hong Kong.

== Other positions held ==
After retiring from his role as the chief executive of the Hong Kong Monetary Authority in September 2009, Joseph Yam took up a number of appointments. Upon his retirement, he was appointed the Executive Vice-President of the China Society for Finance and Banking, a society managed by the People's Bank of China. He thus also became de facto an advisor to the People's Bank of China.

In 2010, Yam was also appointed an independent non-executive director to the board of Johnson Electric Holdings Limited and to the board of China Construction Bank. He was initially appointed for a two-year term till 2012 to the board of Johnson Electric Holdings Limited. This mandate was later extended and Yam is still on the board. He left his post as an independent non-executive director of the China Construction Bank on 23 October 2013.

For the Hong Kong Mortgage Corporation Limited, he was a deputy chairman and director and a member of the advisory council at Central Bank of United Arab Emirates.

Yam is also a member of the International Council of China Investment Corporation, and a member of the boards of UnionPay International Co., Ltd. and of the Community Chest of Hong Kong.

He is also a Distinguished Research Fellow at the Institute of Global Economics and Finance at the Chinese University of Hong Kong.

== Honours ==
In 2001, Yam was awarded the honorary degree of Doctor of Business Administration by the Open University of Hong Kong (OUHK). In November 2009, Yam was awarded Doctor of Business Administration honoris causa by the Hong Kong University of Science & Technology. He was also appointed to the Hong Kong Institute of Education (now the Education University of Hong Kong) as an Honorary Professor affiliated with the Department of Asian and Policy Studies for a period of three years, starting from February 2015.

As well as honorary doctorate degrees and honorary professorships from local and overseas universities, Yam was also recognised for his public service career and contribution to Hong Kong. In 1995, he was appointed Commander of the Most Excellent Order of the British Empire (CBE). In 2009, the Hong Kong Special Administrative Region Government awarded him the Grand Bauhinia Medal (GBM), the highest national award, and in 2001 the Gold Bauhinia Star (GBS). Moreover, in 1997, Euromoney named him Central Banker of the Year.

== Personal life ==
A 2023 declaration of interests showed that Yam was a member of the Hong Kong Golf Club.

Government offices
Preceded by Tony Latter	Deputy Secretary for Monetary Affairs; 1985–1991	Succeeded by: TBD
Preceded by: new office	Director of the Office of the Exchange Fund; 1991–1993	Succeeded by: office abolished
New office	Chief Executive of the Hong Kong Monetary Authority; 1993–2009	Succeeded by Norman Chan
Order of precedence
Preceded by Martin Liao; Member of the Executive Council	Hong Kong order of precedence Member of the Executive Council	Succeeded by James Lau; Member of the Executive Council
