= Hong Kong one hundred and fifty-dollar note =

One hundred and fifty Dollars
- Country: Hong Kong
- Value: 150 Hong Kong dollars
- Width: 153 mm
- Height: 76 mm
- Material used: Paper
- Years of printing: 2009, 2015

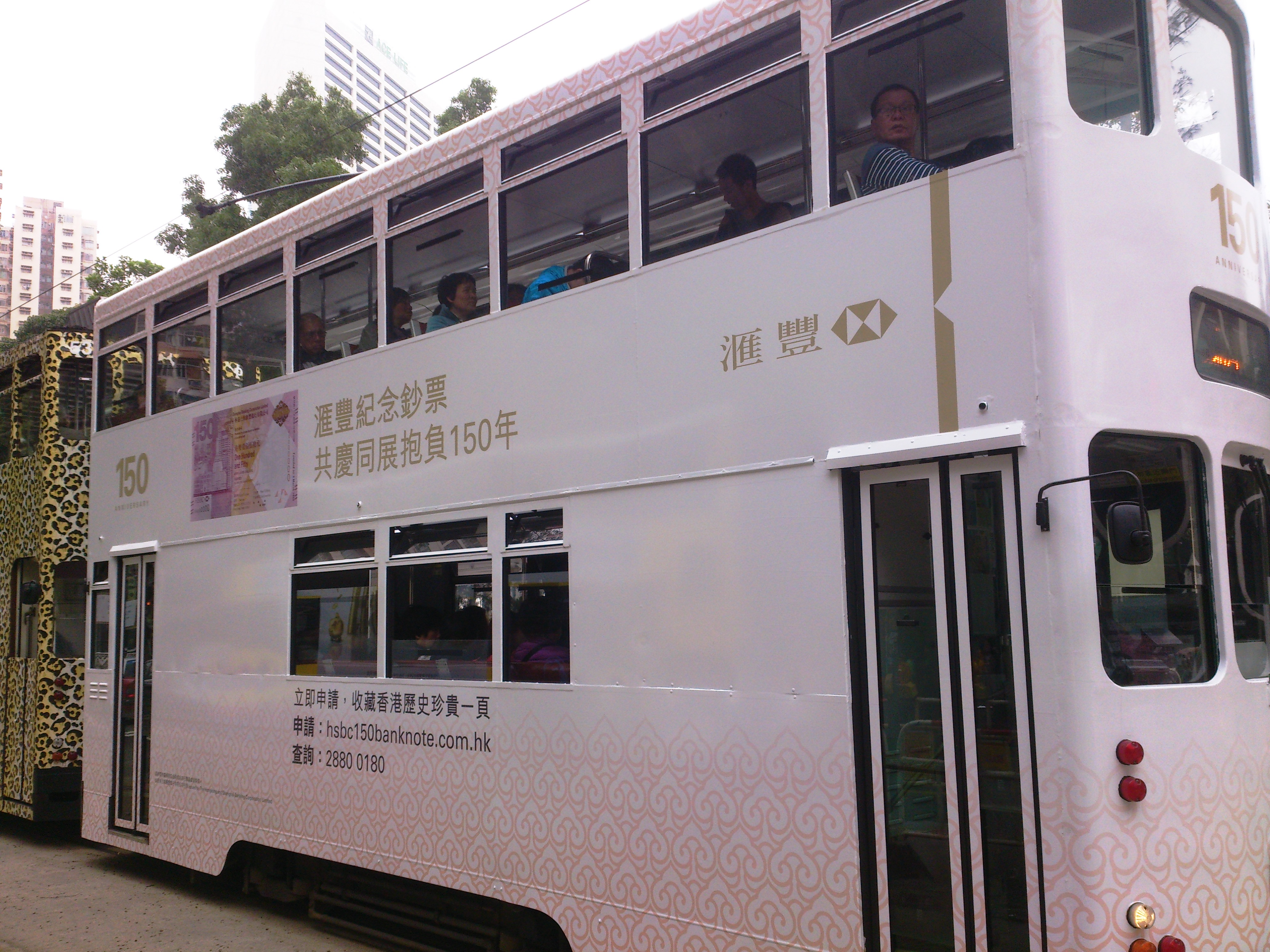
Hong Kong Tram with HSBC 150th Anniversary Banknote promotion

The Hong Kong one hundred and fifty dollar note is a commemorative banknote issued by the Standard Chartered Bank (Hong Kong) on 1 October 2009 and HSBC on 2015 to commemorate on the 150th Anniversary of the Standard Chartered Hong Kong branch and HSBC respectively. It is the world's first 150 base unit denomination banknote. Approximately 1 million notes were issued by Standard Charter and 2 million by HSBC. Owing to its rarity and expected higher re-sale value, the notes are unlikely to enter circulation, though they are still considered legal tender.

== See also ==
- Banknotes of the Hong Kong dollar
