= Hong Kong Note Printing =

Coordinates: 22°27′19″N 114°10′54″E

Hong Kong Note Printing Limited
- Type: Limited
- Industry: Note printing
- Founded: As part of De La Rue plc on 1984; 42 years ago; As Hong Kong Note Printing in April 1996; 30 years ago
- Headquarters: Hong Kong
- Area served: Hong Kong
- Products: Hong Kong banknotes
- Owners: Hong Kong Government (55%); China Banknote Printing and Minting Corporation (15%); HSBC Hong Kong (10%); Standard Chartered Hong Kong (10%); Bank of China (Hong Kong) Limited (10%)
- Website: English website; Traditional Chinese website; Simplified Chinese website

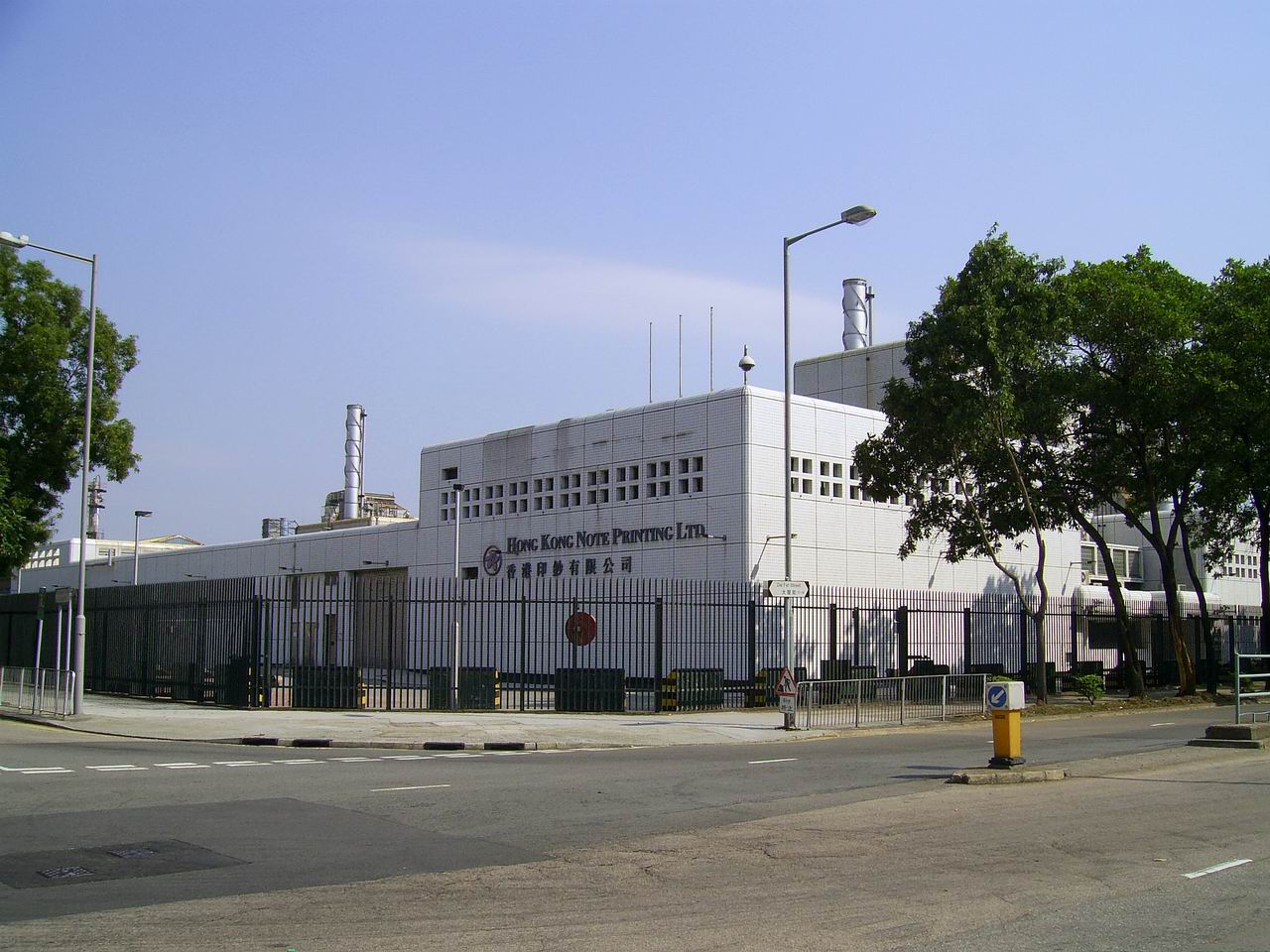
The banknote printing plant of HKNPL in Tai Po Industrial Estate

Hong Kong Note Printing Limited (Chinese: 香港印鈔有限公司) is a company which prints the bank notes of all the three note-issuing banks in Hong Kong and bank notes of Macau. The banknote printing plant was founded in 1984 by Thomas De La Rue in Tai Po Industrial Estate. In April 1996, the Hong Kong Government purchased the plant through the Exchange Fund, and operated it under the current name.

== Shareholders ==
In March 1997, the government sold 15% of the company's issued share capital to the China Banknote Printing and Minting Corporation (CBPMC). In October of the same year, the government sold 10% of the company's issued share capital to each of the three note-issuing banks in Hong Kong (total 30%), namely The Hongkong and Shanghai Banking Corporation Limited, the Standard Chartered Bank (now Standard Chartered Bank (Hong Kong)), and the Hong Kong Branch of the Bank of China (now Bank of China (Hong Kong) Limited).

== See also ==
- Banknotes of the Hong Kong dollar
- Hong Kong dollar
