= Linked exchange rate system in Hong Kong =

Currency Peg System in Hong Kong

A linked exchange rate system is a type of exchange rate regime that pegs the exchange rate of one currency to another. It is the exchange rate system implemented in Hong Kong to stabilise the exchange rate between the Hong Kong dollar (HKD) and the United States dollar (USD). The Macao pataca (MOP) is similarly linked to the Hong Kong dollar.

Unlike a fixed exchange rate system, the government or central bank does not actively interfere in the foreign exchange market by controlling supply and demand of the currency in order to influence the exchange rate. The exchange rate is instead stabilized by an exchange mechanism, whereby the Hong Kong Monetary Authority (HKMA) authorises note-issuing banks to issue new banknotes provided that they deposit an equivalent value of US dollars with the HKMA. The Government, through the HKMA, authorises three commercial banks to issue banknotes:

- The Hongkong and Shanghai Banking Corporation Limited;
- the Standard Chartered Bank (Hong Kong) Limited; and
- the Bank of China (Hong Kong) Limited.

Notes (HK$10 only) are also issued by the HKMA itself because of the continuing demand for small value notes among the public.

== History ==
HKD/USD exchange rate since 1990

As a response to the Black Saturday crisis in 1983, the linked exchange rate system was adopted in Hong Kong on October 17, 1983 through the currency board system. The redemption of certificates of indebtedness (for backing the banknotes) were sent out by note-issuing banks to peg the domestic currency against the US dollar at an internal fixed rate of HK$7.80 = US$1.

The Hong Kong Monetary Authority (HKMA), Hong Kong's de facto central bank, authorised note-issuing banks to issue banknotes. These banks are required to have the same amount of US dollars to issue banknotes. The HKMA guarantees to exchange US dollars into Hong Kong dollars, or vice versa, at the rate of 7.80. When the market rate is substantially below 7.80, the banks will convert US dollars for Hong Kong dollars from the HKMA; Hong Kong dollar supply will increase, and the market rate will climb back to 7.80. The same mechanism also works when the market rate is substantially above 7.80, and the banks will convert Hong Kong dollars for US dollars.

The Hong Kong dollar is backed by one of the world's largest foreign exchange reserves, which is over 7 times the amount of money supplied in circulation or about 48% of Hong Kong dollars M3 at the end of April 2016.

=== Strengthening of Currency Board Arrangements ===
Since 5 September 1998, the HKMA has provided an explicit convertibility undertaking to all licensed banks in Hong Kong to convert Hong Kong dollars in their clearing accounts into US dollars at the fixed exchange rate of HK$7.75 to US$1. Starting from 1 April 1999, the convertibility rate in respect of the Aggregate Balance moved from 7.75 by 1 pip (i.e. $0.0001) per calendar day. It converged with the convertibility rate applicable to the issuance and redemption of Certificates of Indebtedness at 7.80 on 12 August 2000.

The HKMA announced three refinements on 18 May 2005 to remove uncertainty about the extent to which the exchange rate may strengthen under the Linked Exchange Rate System:

1. the introduction of a strong-side Convertibility Undertaking by the HKMA to buy US dollars from licensed banks at 7.75;
2. the shifting of the existing weak-side Convertibility Undertaking by the HKMA to sell US dollars to licensed banks from 7.80 to 7.85, so as to achieve symmetry around the Linked Rate of 7.80. This shift was achieved in a gradual manner over five weeks by moving the exchange rate of the weak-side Convertibility Undertaking by 100 pips on every Monday starting with 7.81 on 23 May 2005 until it reached 7.85 on 20 June 2005;
3. within the zone defined by the levels of the Convertibility Undertakings (the "Convertibility Zone"), the HKMA may choose to conduct market operations consistent with Currency Board principles. These market operations shall be aimed at promoting the smooth functioning of the Linked Exchange Rate System, for example, by removing any market anomalies that may arise from time to time.

== See also ==
- Hong Kong dollar
- Banknotes of the Hong Kong dollar
- Hong Kong Monetary Authority
- Currency board
