= Exchange Fund (Hong Kong) =

Sovereign wealth fund of Hong Kong

- Native name: 香港外匯基金
- Industry: Sovereign wealth fund
- Founded: 1935; 91 years ago
- Headquarters: Hong Kong
- AUM: US$569 billion (2026)
- Parent: Hong Kong Monetary Authority

The Exchange Fund of Hong Kong is the primary investment arm and de facto sovereign wealth fund of the Hong Kong Monetary Authority. First established in 1935 in order to provide backing to the issuance of Hong Kong dollar banknotes, over the years the role of the Fund has continually expanded to now include management of fiscal reserves, foreign currency reserves, real estate investments, and private equity.

== Portfolio of Funds ==
The Exchange Fund, which oversees over HKD 4 trillion of assets as of 31 December 2019, consists of a number of different portfolios. The Exchange Fund runs three main portfolios with the Government's fiscal reserves, investing in a number of different assets (for varying risk and return levels), while separate funds set up (with funding coming from other sources) may also choose to invest in these core portfolios. In other words, portfolios indicate assets being held by the Exchange Fund, while funds indicate other funding sources.

=== Core Portfolios ===
- Backing Portfolio – Established in 1998, invests in short-term, highly liquid US dollar securities used to defend the Hong Kong dollar and maintain the currency peg.
- Investment Portfolio – Established in 1998, invests in bonds and equities of developed countries in order to preserve Hong Kong's long-term purchasing power.
- Long-Term Growth Portfolio – Established in 2009, invests in private equity and overseas real estate; focuses on seeking a higher rate of return on investments than the traditional safe assets that the Backing Portfolio and Investment Portfolio invests in.

=== Future Fund ===
The Land Fund was established in 1986 to specifically manage the Government's revenue obtained from land sales during the period commencing from the entry into force of the Joint Declaration (27 May 1985) until the Handover of Hong Kong (1 July 1997). It was managed as a part of the Investment Portfolio since 1 July 1997 until 1 January 2016, when the Future Fund was established. The funds were then transferred to the Future Fund, and the Land Fund ceased to exist.

- Future Fund – Established in 2016 with a 10-year investment period (ending 31 December 2025, with an option to extend), half of the Fund is invested in the HKMA's own Long-Term Growth Portfolio, while the rest is put into the Investment Portfolio and other external investments as well. Its primary purpose is to prepare for expected increases in government spending due to an aging demographic.
  - Hong Kong Growth Portfolio – Established in 2020 as a private equity fund, with 10% of the Future Fund put in, it will focus on investing in "companies, projects and funds with a Hong Kong nexus", and would look for opportunities in innovation and technology companies and projects with high growth potential and return while avoiding real estate projects.

=== Others ===
- Strategic Fund – Established in 2007, holds equities listed on the Hong Kong Exchange for strategic purposes; its returns are not included in the Exchange Fund's overall return.
