= Eddie Yue =

Hong Kong central banker (born 1964)

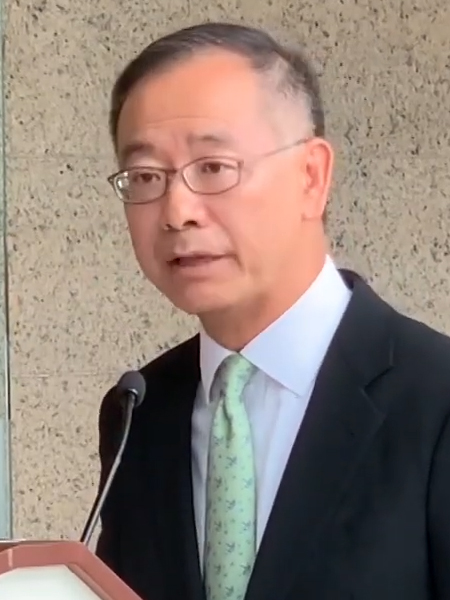

3rd Chief Executive of the Hong Kong Monetary Authority
- Incumbent
- Assumed office 1 October 2019
- Chief Executive: Carrie Lam; John Lee
- Preceded by: Norman LP Chan

Personal details
- Born: September 21, 1964 (age 61)
- Party: none
- Education: Diocesan Boys' School
- Alma mater: Chinese University of Hong Kong (BBA); University of London (LLB, MS); Harvard Business School (MBA)
- Occupation: Treasury official, Civil servant
- Profession: Bank director, civil servant

Eddie Yue Wai-man (Chinese: 余偉文; born 21 September 1964) is the 3rd and current Chief Executive of the Hong Kong Monetary Authority, having held the position since 1 October 2019.

== Education ==
Yue received a bachelor's degree from the Chinese University of Hong Kong, a law degree and a master's degree from the University of London, and an MBA from Harvard Business School.

== Controversies ==
In September 2022, Yue said that when inviting executives to Hong Kong for the Global Financial Leaders' Investment Summit in November 2022, "Nobody asked about quarantine restrictions [then], or any arrangements needed to come to Hong Kong." In contrast, earlier reports said that executives told the Hong Kong government they would be reluctant to travel if hotel quarantine was required, or if any other restrictions remained in place. Yue said that their attendance to the Summit was a vote of confidence for the city. On 27 October 2022, Yue said that he hoped the public would understand letting the guests to the Summit be exempt from normal COVID-19 restrictions, where other arrivals to Hong Kong cannot eat at restaurants in the first 3 days after landing in the city. Despite the COVID-19 exemptions for the guests, Yue said "Hong Kong is back."

Political offices
Preceded by Norman Chan	Chief Executive of the Hong Kong Monetary Authority; 2019 – present	Incumbent
