= Norman Chan =

Hong Kong banker, treasury official, and civil servant

Norman Chan GBS, JP
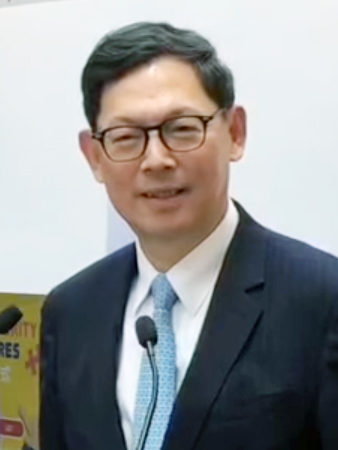

2nd Chief Executive of the Hong Kong Monetary Authority
- In office 1 October 2009 – 30 September 2019
- Chief Executive: Sir Donald Tsang; Leung Chun-ying; Carrie Lam
- Preceded by: Joseph Yam
- Succeeded by: Eddie Yue

3rd Director of the Chief Executive's Office
- In office 1 July 2007 – 31 July 2009
- Preceded by: Donald Tsang
- Succeeded by: Raymond Tam

Personal details
- Born: Norman Chan Tak-Lam; 1954 (age 71–72) Hong Kong
- Party: none
- Children: 2
- Education: Queen's College; Chung Chi College, CUHK (BSS)
- Occupation: Treasury official, Civil servant
- Profession: Sociologist, bank director, civil servant

Norman Chan
- Traditional Chinese: 陳德霖
- Simplified Chinese: 陈德霖
Transcriptions
Standard Mandarin
- Hanyu Pinyin: Chén Délín
Yue: Cantonese
- Yale Romanization: Chàhn Dāk làhm
- Jyutping: Can^{4} Dak^{1} lam^{4}

Norman Chan Tak-lam, GBS, JP (born 1954), is a Hong Kong banker, treasury official, and civil servant. Chan was Chief Executive of the Hong Kong Monetary Authority from 2009 to 2019. He previously was Director of the Office of the Chief Executive of the HKSAR and Regional Vice-Chairman of Standard Chartered Bank. He was awarded the Silver Bauhinia Star (SBS) in 1999 and te Gold Bauhinia Star (GBS) in 2012 in recognition of his contributions to society.

== Career ==
Norman Chan graduated from Queen's College, Hong Kong, and then earned a degree in sociology at the Chinese University of Hong Kong. In 1976 Chan entered the Hong Kong Civil Service as an Administrative Officer. By 1991 he was appointed a Deputy Director of Monetary Management at the Exchange Fund of Hong Kong. At the creation of the Hong Kong Monetary Authority (HKMA) in 1993, Chan was named an Executive Director, and later took the role of vice president. In December 2005, he became the Vice-Chairman of the Asian region of Standard Chartered Bank. In July 2007, he was appointed as Director of the Office of the Hong Kong Chief Executive.

In July 2009, Financial Secretary John Tsang named Chan to the role of HKMA Chief Executive, from 1 October that year, on the retirement of Joseph Yam. Chan was compensated with an annual base salary of HK$6 million. With his reappointment in 2014, Chan was Chief Executive for exactly ten years, stepping down from the role in a pre-announced move on 1 October 2019.

Within weeks, he was reportedly in consideration for the role of Chief Executive of Hong Kong, as news leaked of Carrie Lam's imminent removal from the post.

== Political comment ==
In 2014, he and his HKMA predecessor Joseph Yam said that Occupy (the 2014 Hong Kong protests, aka the Umbrella Movement) could threaten city's economic growth.

== Office ==
In June 2020, Chan and his wife, through their company Citirich (Hong Kong) Limited bought a 1,040 square foot office on the 10th floor of the Kam Chung Commercial Building on Hennessy Road in Wan Chai. The office was purchased for HK$10.8 million without a mortgage.

Political offices
Preceded by John Tsang	Director of the Chief Executive's Office; 2007–2009	Succeeded by Raymond Tam
Government offices
Preceded by Joseph Yam	Chief Executive of the Hong Kong Monetary Authority; 2009 – 2019	Succeeded by Eddie Yue
