= Global Financial Leaders' Investment Summit =

Financial summit in Hong Kong

- Frequency: Annual
- Location: Hong Kong
- Inaugurated: 2022
- Previous event: 2023
- Next event: 2024
- Organiser: Hong Kong Monetary Authority
- Website: hkma.gov.hk

The Global Financial Leaders' Investment Summit is an annual financial summit based in Hong Kong, organised by the Hong Kong Monetary Authority. The inaugural event took place in November 2022.

The organisers goal was to discuss challenges and opportunities facing the global financial community and also for the Hong Kong government to show the re-opening of the city. There has been significant controversy from United States lawmakers around US finance leaders attending the summit.

== 2023 summit ==
In November 2023, The Wall Street Journal described American executives going to the event as "various and sundry Wall Street grandees are coming to Hong Kong to kiss [John Lee's] ring." The editorial specifically named James Gorman of Morgan Stanley, David Solomon of Goldman Sachs, Johnathan Gray of Blackstone, Jane Fraser of Citigroup, and Jennifer Johnson of Franklin Resources. The editorial stated that Lee had made efforts to "crack down on speech" in Hong Kong.

After the event, the Hong Kong Journalists Association complained about the event, saying that reporters blocked by the HKMA from interviewing attendees, and that freedom of the press was important due to the event having "a significant impact on Hong Kong’s financial markets and economic development."

== 2022 summit ==
=== Background ===
The initiative was announced by Financial Secretary Paul Chan in March 2022, and the theme is "Navigating Beyond Uncertainty" with the goal of discussing challenges and opportunities facing the global financial community. Another hope for the Summit was for the government to show the re-opening and reconnecting of the city.

According to Eddie Yue of the HKMA, the Summit is expecting around 200 guests (including over 30 CEOs and chairmen) from over 100 major financial institutions.

For guests who stay after the Summit concludes, the 2022 Hong Kong Sevens is scheduled to take place afterwards. Guests to the Summit will also be given free coupons as gifts to the Wine and Dine Festival, from the Hong Kong Tourism Board, where they can be redeemed at 210 restaurants and bars for free cocktails or other drinks. The tickets are reserved and separate from the 50,000 allocated to the public.

=== COVID-19 exemptions ===
==== Guests ====
Some firms had earlier warned that their top bosses would not attend if any COVID-19 restrictions remained in place. Other executives did not want special exemptions from the restrictions, due to bad optics if other people still faced restrictions. Yue gave a conflicting statement in September 2022 and said that "Nobody asked about quarantine restrictions [then], or any arrangements needed to come to Hong Kong" when the HKMA invited guests in March 2022. Earlier, Jamie Dimon and Nicole Kidman triggered local outrage by having given special exemptions from quarantine. Hong Kong Economic Times reported in August 2022 that the government was considering special exemptions for Summit guests.

Yue said on 29 September 2022 that "I am most grateful to our friends who are travelling to attend the Summit at a time when some anti-epidemic controls remain in place." However, on 20 October 2022, SCMP(South China Morning Post) reported that guests to the Summit will be exempted from certain COVID-19 restrictions that other regular arrivals to Hong Kong face. With the "0+3" measure, normal arrivals to Hong Kong are issued an "amber code" on their LeaveHomeSafe app during their first 3 days in the city, barring them from eating at restaurants, and visiting bars, gyms, and other venues. However, guests to the Summit will not be subject to the amber code restriction, allowing them to visit such venues.

In addition, while testing positive for COVID-19, people are not allowed to leave Hong Kong on commercial airliners and must be quarantined in hotels until testing negative, but guests to the Summit will be allowed to leave by private jet and yachts. A CEO of a private jet company said interest from banking professionals had increased due to the Summit, with prices ranging from US$230,000 to US$350,000 to fly from Hong Kong to London and New York.

The Health Bureau discussed the plans with the HKMA to finalize the details of the exemptions. Speaking on the exemptions, an HKMA spokesperson said "The government has approved a set of infection-control arrangements that are applicable to the coming summit. The arrangements will provide the necessary facilitation for participants to take part in the summit and business activities." One of the sources for SCMP stated that "The arrangements are aimed at showing the top bankers that Hong Kong is back to normal and ready to reconnect with the international business community" but did not state how special COVID-19 exemptions made the city "back to normal."

On 24 October 2022, Yue also mentioned "back to normal," stating "This is exactly the kind of vibrant activity that characterises Hong Kong as a regional hub, and that we want to emphasise as we get back to normal after the restrictions necessitated by the pandemic." Yue also said that the special exemptions were part of "reasonable facilitation" for guests, and that they would be allowed to "visit certain venues that require active checking." On 27 October 2022, Yue said that he hopes to show the world that "Hong Kong is back." On 31 October 2022, the deputy CEO of the HKMA, Darryl Chan, said that the Summit would show the world that Hong Kong is reconnecting and reopening.

On 26 October 2022, Kwok Cheuk-kin said he would launch a legal challenge against the vaccine pass policies, stating "I will challenge whether [vaccine pass policies] are necessary. Hongkongers can only access designated premises by using this app but people coming for the financial summit are not required to. This is against the Basic Law as residents are equal before the law," referring to Article 25 of the Basic Law.

On 1 November 2022, Chief Executive John Lee rejected criticism that there were "double standards" with the exemptions for the Summit guests.

On 7 November 2022, though Yue earlier said that Hong Kong was "back to normal," he said that guests to the Summit wanted to see a further reduction in Hong Kong's pandemic restrictions, and an open border with mainland China.

==== Paul Chan ====
On 27 October 2022, Chan tested positive for COVID-19 while in Saudi Arabia. Chan was scheduled to give speeches on November 2 and 3 at the Summit. Rules from the Saudi Arabian government state that a person infected with COVID-19 with symptoms must isolate until the person shows 3 days of no symptoms.

According to Hong Kong government rules, "Inbound persons arriving from overseas places or Taiwan are required to conduct a Rapid Antigen Test (RAT) with a negative result within 24 hours prior to the scheduled time of departure of the flight to Hong Kong." Also, anybody testing positive upon landing in Hong Kong are required to be sent to quarantine or isolation facilities. In addition, government rules state that confirmed cases will be given a "red code" on their LeaveHomeSafe app, that they "are not allowed to leave the isolation location to avoid infecting others," and that "completion of isolation refers to having negative rapid antigen test (RAT) results on both Day 6 and Day 7 (or two consecutive days thereafter)." On 28 October 2022, Chan promised to do his "best" to attend the Summit in person. On 31 October 2022, the government said that Chan had tested negative with a rapid test and would be back in Hong Kong on 1 November 2022.

On 1 November 2022, Chief Executive John Lee said that Chan would have to take a PCR test upon arrival in Hong Kong, and will have to isolate if he tests positive. Lee stressed that Chan would not be allowed any exemptions.

When Chan landed in Hong Kong at around 7pm on 1 November 2022, he said he tested positive on 26 October 2022, and tested negative on his rapid test on 31 October 2022. Later that night after he landed, authorities said that they had assessed his case and PCR test, and determined that Chan had recovered. The Department of Health, in a press release issued at 11:57pm, said Chan was a "recovered case and was not contagious, and isolation was not required," but did not specify if Chan tested negative on his PCR test. The press release also stated that Chan will attend the Summit but "will not take part in meals," and did not specify the reason behind that if he had "recovered." Chan's office also did not disclose the result of his PCR test. Hong Kong Free Press contacted both the Department of Health and Financial Secretary's Office for further comment. Benjamin Cowling, an epidemiologist at the University of Hong Kong said of Chan's PCR test that "It's very unlikely to have a negative PCR test within a day of being RAT positive. Sometimes the PCR can stay positive for weeks."

On 2 November 2022, SCMP reported that Chan's PCR test was positive. There was no information in the report about Chief Executive Lee's earlier pledge that Chan would have to isolate if he tested positive.

SCMP reported that Chan was ordered to keep his mask on and refrain from attending banquets, but on 2 November 2022, Chan spoke at the Summit without wearing a mask. Every speaker, including John Lee, did not wear a mask. Later that day, the government denied that Chan was given any special treatment. In a press release, the government said that Chan "conducted a PCR test upon arrival at the HKIA yesterday and the result was positive with Ct value within the range of the above-mentioned recovered cases," but did not provide the numerical range of acceptable Ct values which would exempt one from isolation. SCMP contacted the government, asking for the exact Ct value of his PCR test. Earlier, government policy considered a person "recovered" if they were infected between 14 and 90 days prior to boarding their plane to Hong Kong; Chan flew to Hong Kong about a week after his initial positive result. Hong Kong Free Press contacted Chan's office, and asked whether he had flown on a private jet or commercial flight.

On 3 November 2022, Chan said that he did not benefit from any "double standards" and "So the treatment I have been given was the same as anyone. There is no particular privilege at all." In contrast, Hong Kong's leading microbiologist from the University of Hong Kong, Ho Pak-leung, criticized the government's inconsistency and said there was a "failing to comply with a unified standard" with regard to Chan's case.

On 3 November 2022, Edwin Tsui Lok-kin of the Centre for Health Protection refused to reveal Chan's Ct value or the range of permissible values which would exempt one from isolation.

On 5 November 2022, the editorial board of SCMP said that the government should have been more transparent with Chan's case, and said "It is therefore essential that relevant policies and restrictions apply equally."

On 6 November 2022, Chan said that the Summit has shown "the world Hong Kong's openness and its return to normality," and said that guests' "experiences in Hong Kong were different from what they have seen in foreign media outlets." Chan also said the Summit showed the guests a "different image" of the city.

==== Criticism of restrictions and exemptions ====
Both the on-going restrictions and exemptions granted to certain people were criticized. On 4 November 2022, Sally Wong of the Hong Kong Investment Funds Association said of Hong Kong's COVID-19 restrictions, "While we are claiming ourselves to be a super connector, connecting to China and to the rest of the world, we cannot live up to this reputation." The same day, The New York Times released an articled, titled "In Bid to Show It Is Open, Hong Kong Bends Covid Rules ... for Some." One person interviewed said "If the rules are to be fair, it should be done across all levels of society."

Chinese University economist Simon Lee Siu-po said "The government can't say Hong Kong is back while keeping the border closed for another half a year. Foreign companies won't wait any longer."

On 7 November 2022, Alice Wu of SCMP released an opinion article titled "If bankers can get the special '0+0' travel treatment amid Covid pandemic, let the rest of Hong Kong too," where she said "The privilege awarded to our special guests is truly remarkable: no health code, no masks, no Covid-19, and no typhoon. It's as if we live in a parallel universe."

In a November 2022 interview, Bill Winters, CEO of Standard Chartered, who was a speaker at the Summit, said of the current restrictions "I think you should scrap the whole thing. No tests on arrival, no tests on departure, and then just ask people to be responsible." He also said that testing is an issue because business travelers risk getting stuck in Hong Kong for around a week if they test positive.

=== Criticism ===
On 5 October 2022, Politico published an article, mentioning US lawmakers who condemned the US banking executives who planned to go to the event, saying that the executives had made a mockery of the US government sanctions against Chief Executive John Lee, as Lee is sanctioned by the US government under Executive Order 13936. Lee was sanctioned due to him "being involved in coercing, arresting, detaining, or imprisoning individuals under the authority of the National Security Law." Representative Chris Smith said that companies "that trumpet their so-called 'Environmental, Social and Governance Principles' at home are quick to discard these 'values' for a chance to make a profit from China." Representative Blaine Luetkemeyer said of Lee that "American executives attending an event with the CCP's so-called enforcer makes a person question whether human rights are a real concern." Representative Lance Gooden said "The hypocrisy is staggering and every financial institution enabling China's atrocities should be ashamed."

Tara Joseph, former president of the American Chamber of Commerce in Hong Kong, asked "Why do [they] need to go and showboat in Hong Kong now?", and Hanscom Smith, former U.S. Consul General in Hong Kong said "It's not business as usual in Hong Kong, and those companies who do business are going to have to grapple with that uncertainty for the foreseeable future."

On 17 October 2022, a group of 20 Hong Kong advocacy groups sent a letter to President Joe Biden and other senior government officials, calling on them to forbid US-based executives from attending the Summit. The letter pointed out Lee is scheduled to meet with guests during a breakfast event, and that Lee had earlier said "We will just laugh off the so-called sanctions" from the US government.

Additionally, the letter remarked that Citigroup CEO Jane Fraser is scheduled to speak at the event, but had earlier said that her bank would "follow [US] government guidance" on China. CEO Jamie Dimon also earlier said that JPMorgan Chase, which is sending COO Daniel Pinto to the event, will "absolutely salute and follow whatever the American government said, which is you all, what you want us to do."

On 22 October 2022, The Wall Street Journal released an article by its editorial board in its printed edition, titled "Wall Street and Hong Kong's Strongman," saying that even if meeting with Lee at the Summit does not violate US sanctions, "The lesson is that no business or executive is safe in Hong Kong. These executives may feel they have assets to protect in the city, but by kowtowing to Mr. Lee they are doing their reputations, and that of their companies, no good." The article pointed out the forced closure by the Hong Kong government of pro-democracy newspapers such as Apple Daily and Stand News, and the arrest of Jimmy Lai.

On 25 October 2022, the Hong Kong Democracy Council (HKDC) released a report titled "Business Not As Usual," which criticized executives going to the Global Financial Leaders' Investment Summit (GFLIS), stating "By attending the GFLIS, these global finance leaders are lending credibility not only to the government's whitewashing campaign, but also to Beijing's handpicked Chief Executive of Hong Kong, John Lee, who is scheduled to open the GFLIS with 'welcoming remarks.'" Hours after the report was published, the Hong Kong government blocked people from accessing the site on some of Hong Kong's major mobile networks and internet service providers. An HKDC spokesperson said "HKDC condemns the Hong Kong government's concerted efforts to erode internet freedom, among the many freedoms Hongkongers have been stripped of over the past years."

On 25 October 2022, Bloomberg released an article titled "Old Boys Club at Hong Kong Banking Summit Puts Women on Sidelines," where it pointed out that a disproportional amount of speakers at the Summit will be men. A professor asked "How is it that in this day and age, 87% of the speakers at the conference are men?" The HKMA responded to Bloomberg, stating "We are pleased to see a strong line-up of speakers at group chairman or CEO level to share their global perspectives."

On 26 October 2022, the Chinese Human Rights Defenders, headquartered in Washington DC, said that it "calls on these financial leaders to bring up the deteriorating human rights situation in Hong Kong as a matter of the utmost urgency."

On 26 October 2022, the New York Post released an article from Mark L. Clifford, former director of the publisher of Apple Daily (a newspaper closed by the Hong Kong government), titled "Big bankers are betting wrong in heading to Hong Kong." In the article, Clifford says that "Hong Kong Chief Executive John Lee isn't allowed to open an account with any of these American banks - yet their leaders are happy to hobnob with Lee and polish the city's tarnished image." Additionally, Clifford mentions the arrest of Cardinal Joseph Zen by the Hong Kong government.

On 27 October 2022, two more US lawmakers urged the US financial executives to cancel their attendance to the Summit, with Senator Jeff Merkley and Representative Jim McGovern of the Congressional-Executive Commission on China saying "Their presence only serves to legitimize the swift dismantling of Hong Kong's autonomy, free press, and the rule of law by Hong Kong authorities acting along with the Chinese Communist Party."

On 27 October 2022, The Committee for Freedom in Hong Kong Foundation projected images onto a building in New York to protest the Summit, with one image saying "Wall Street CEOs: don't support human rights abuses in HK."

On 29 October 2022, Nikkei Asia reported that Hanscom Smith, who earlier made comments about the Summit with Politico, said "Hong Kong's attractiveness as a destination for investment and as a place to do business has suffered because of the uncertainty that comes with a national security law."

On 3 November 2022, The Wall Street Journal released a second article from its editorial board, titled "Wall Street's Hong Kong Kowtow," where it said "The Americans were used as props in the effort by Hong Kong officials to revive the city's reputation as a commercial center amid their continuing purge of all dissent, and the destruction of a free press and independent judiciary." It also referenced earlier warnings by US Congress members, saying "Maybe someone in the next Congress should ask the execs to appear and explain why they kowtowed to Mr. Lee."

On 5 November 2022, CNN released an article titled "Hong Kong says it's back open for business. Will the world buy it?," where it mentioned the Summit amidst the city's pandemic restrictions and political crackdown on the pro-democracy movement.

==== US panel speakers ====
Some of the US-based or US-citizen panel speakers include: James Gorman (Morgan Stanley), Jonathan Gray (Blackstone), David Solomon (Goldman Sachs), Joseph Bae (KKR), Jane Fraser (Citigroup), Rob Kapito (BlackRock), Daniel Pinto (JPMorgan Chase), Bill Winters (Standard Chartered), William Conway Jr. (Carlyle Group), Jim Zetler (Apollo Global Management), Hanneke Smits (BNY Mellon Investment Management), and Cyrus Taraporevala (State Street Global Advisors).

=== Cancellations ===
Justine Nolan, a professor at the University of New South Wales, told Al Jazeera that "For example, an executive might attend but make a public statement about concerns or choose not to attend and associate their absence with concern about human rights and the rule of law in Hong Kong," though the banks had not indicated any public intent to get involved in the politics. Some financial executives also told Nikkei Asia that they decided to not attend the event, while others said they saw little chance of improving the appeal of a city that still imposed travel restrictions.

==== Speakers ====
On 27 October 2022, Reuters reported that Jane Fraser tested positive for COVID-19 and will not attend the event. The absence of Fraser would further reduce the ratio of female speakers at the event, which was 13% before Fraser pulled out. Instead, Citigroup will send Anand Selvakesari to the event. At the Summit, Selvakesari said that Hong Kong's status was "business as usual" and was similar "as being in New York."

On 30 October 2022, Bloomberg reported that Blackstone president Jonathan Gray would no longer attend due to being COVID positive, and would instead send CFO Michael Chae to the Summit.

CEO Valérie Baudson (Amundi), who was scheduled to speak on sustainable finance, cancelled her trip due to family reasons.

CEO Timothy Armour (Capital Group), who was also scheduled to speak at the Summit, cancelled his trip for health reasons.

==== Non-speaking guests ====
C.S. Venkatakrishnan of Barclays was scheduled to be attend the Summit as a non-speaking guest, and later canceled his plans to attend the Summit, reported to be due to changes in his schedule.

=== China ===
Fang Xinghai, vice chairperson of the China Securities Regulatory Commission, made remarks by prerecorded video to the Summit. In it, he warned investors to not read too much foreign news (international media) about China, and said that some international investors read "too much" of it. Fang also warned the bankers to not "bet against China and Hong Kong."

UBS chair Colm Kelleher said, regarding global bankers, that "we're all very pro-China," and in reference to Fang's comments, said "We're not reading the American press, we actually buy the [China] story."

In contrast, Mark Carney at the Summit said that he would like to "commend the international media" and also said that "And I believe what I read in the international media." Carney was part of a fireside chat about environmental, social and corporate governance (ESG).

The mainland Chinese panel speakers who joined the Summit by video instead of by person highlighted the tight travel restrictions imposed by China's zero-Covid approach.

On the final day of the Summit, Weijan Shan of PAG moderated a panel, and asked the panel speakers where they would invest their money in, with the choices being China, the European Union, Japan, and the US. None of the panel speakers chose China.
