= Hong Kong Monetary Authority =

Central bank of Hong Kong

Hong Kong Monetary Authority 香港金融管理局

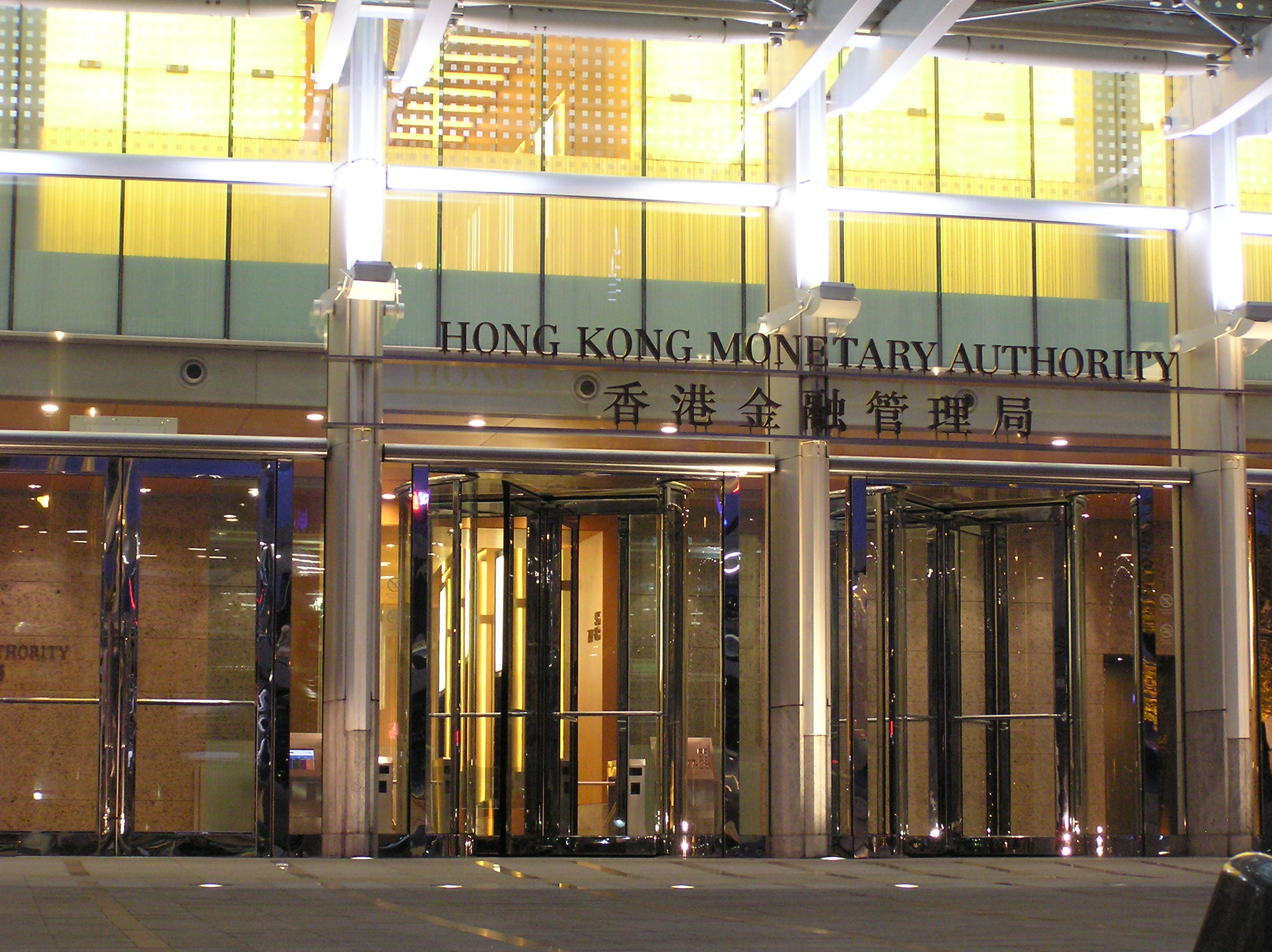
- HKMA building entrance
- Central bank of: Hong Kong
- Headquarters: International Finance Centre, Central, Hong Kong
- Established: 1 April 1993; 33 years ago
- Chief Executive: Eddie Yue
- Currency: Hong Kong dollar HKD (ISO 4217)
- Bank rate: 2.75% (as of 28 July 2022)
- Interest on reserves: None
- Website: www.hkma.gov.hk

Hong Kong Monetary Authority
- Chinese: 香港金融管理局
- Jyutping: hoeng1 gong2 gam1 jung4 gun2 lei5 guk6-2
Transcriptions
Standard Mandarin
- Hanyu Pinyin: Xiānggǎng jīnróng guǎnlǐjú
- Bopomofo: ㄒㄧㄤ ㄍㄤˇ ㄐㄧㄣ ㄖㄨㄥˊ ㄍㄨㄢˇ ㄌㄧˇ ㄐㄩˊ
- Wade–Giles: Hsiang1-kang3 chin1-jung2 kuan3-li3-chü2
- IPA: [ɕjáŋ kàŋ tɕín ɻʊ̌ŋ kwàn lì tɕǔ]
Yue: Cantonese
- Yale Romanization: Hēunggóng gāmyùng gúnléihgúk
- Jyutping: hoeng1 gong2 gam1 jung4 gun2 lei5 guk6-2
- Sidney Lau: Heung^{1°}gong^{2} gam^{1°}yung^{2} gun^{2}lei^{5}guk^{6*}
- Canton Romanization: hêng1gong2 gem1yung4 gun2léi5gug2
- IPA: [hœ́ːŋ kɔ̌ːŋ kɐ́m jȍŋ kǔːn le̬i kǒk̚]

Alternative Chinese name
- Chinese: 金管局
Transcriptions
Standard Mandarin
- Hanyu Pinyin: Jīnguǎnjú
- Bopomofo: ㄐㄧㄣ ㄍㄨㄢˇ ㄐㄩˊ
- Wade–Giles: Chin1-kuan3-chü2
- IPA: [tɕín kwàn tɕǔ]
Yue: Cantonese
- Yale Romanization: Gām gún gúk
- Sidney Lau: Gam^{1°} gun^{2} guk^{6*}
- Canton Romanization: Gem1 gun2 gug2
- IPA: [kɐ́m kǔːn kǒk̚]

The Hong Kong Monetary Authority (HKMA) is the central banking institution of Hong Kong. It is a government authority founded on 1 April 1993 when the Office of the Exchange Fund and the Office of the Commissioner of Banking merged. The organisation reports directly to the Financial Secretary.

== Responsibilities ==
The exchange fund was established and managed originally by the Currency Ordinance in 1935, now named the Exchange Fund Ordinance. Under the Ordinance, the HKMA's primary objective is to ensure the stability of the Hong Kong currency and the banking system. It is also responsible for promoting the efficiency, integrity and development of the financial system.

The HKMA issues banknotes only in the denomination of ten Hong Kong dollars. The role of issuing other banknotes is delegated to the note-issuing banks in the territory, namely The Hongkong and Shanghai Banking Corporation, Standard Chartered Bank and Bank of China.

== Policies ==
The official reserves of Hong Kong and the banking system are important underpinnings of the linked exchange rate system.

=== Tools ===
Since 1995, the HKMA has entered into a stability pact with central banks in Malaysia, Thailand, Indonesia and Australia to engage in repurchase agreements, which provide liquidity on a two-way basis.

== Infrastructure ==
The Central Moneymarkets Unit (CMU), established in the 1990, provides computerised clearing and settlement facilities for Exchange Fund Bills and Notes. It extended the service to other Hong Kong dollar debt securities in late 1993. A seamless interface allow the co-existence of the CMU and the newly launched real-time gross settlement (RTGS) inter-bank payment system. This enables end-of-day delivery versus payment (DVP) services as opposed to Non-DVP.

In 2018, HKMA developed the infrastructure for the Faster Payment System and launched it in September of that year.

=== Banking licenses ===
Banking stability mainly depends on the banking system and supervision. A three-tier banking system (銀行三級發牌制度) was implemented in the 1980s. Institutions are also managed differently depending on whether they are categorised as licensed banks, restricted license banks or deposit-taking institutions. Overseas banks may also establish local representative offices in Hong Kong.

In 2019, the HKMA began issuing the first batch of virtual bank licenses in Hong Kong; these banks were not required to have physical branches in the city.

== Monetary stability ==
=== Currency board system ===
It is included the Linked Exchange Rate System and noticeable features such as the Aggregate Balance, Certificates of Indebtedness and coins issued and the Outstanding Exchange Fund Bills and Notes.

The Interest Rate Adjustment Mechanism is an automatic system that maintains the stability of the Hong Kong dollar exchange rate. Lately the HKMA has been disclosing the forecast change in the Aggregate Balance attributes to increase the transparency of the Currency Board operation.

In 1995, Nobel Prize–winning economist Milton Friedman mistakenly predicted the Hong Kong dollar's demise within two years of the 1997 handover. He also predicted the absorption of the territory's financial reserves of US$43 billion (HK$335.4 billion) by Beijing, which would not be able to bear the subrogation of Hong Kong's monetary policy to the United States.

As with any monetary system not based on a fiat money (which includes currency boards, currency unions and the traditional gold standard) it is impossible to use monetary policy to stabilise the business cycle: this means that any macroeconomic adjustment has to be achieved by changes in the prices of assets and labour. In Hong Kong, this is made easier by two factors: the first is the openness of the economy, with an aggregate demand heavily dependent on international trading partners; this reduces the risk of classic liquidity traps. The second factor is the scarce political clout of the trade unions, which makes it easier to trim the nominal salaries during recessionary times. Moreover, the high saving rates and the moral stigma attached to bankruptcy have kept relatively low the level of defaults on mortgages even during the deep recessions after the 1997 Asian financial crisis and the SARS epidemic in 2002/2003.

=== Exchange fund ===
Under colonial rule, the HKMA did not place funds with local banks not rated by Moody's Investors Service or Standard & Poor's. Only the three note-issuing banks could receive deposits because they had been rated by "objective international standards".

During the 1997 Asian financial crisis, currency speculators sold the Hong Kong dollar heavily and shorted local stocks and Hang Seng Index futures. The government controversially used the exchange fund to acquire HK$120 billion (US$15 billion) worth of blue-chip shares in a two-week market intervention, beginning 12 August 1998 with the aim of punishing and deterring currency speculators. The intervention was widely criticised as being detrimental to Hong Kong's reputation as one of the world's financial centres. Democratic Party leader Martin Lee Chu-ming criticised the government for becoming "a player, a very key player" instead of being a regulator. Conversely, one speculator said in hindsight that the government's intervention "raised public confidence in the market when it was near total collapse" and "prevented a bigger crisis and saved the market". Most stocks acquired during that operation were successively disposed with the creation of a tracker fund, the TraHK. This reduced the portfolio of Hong Kong equities to 5.3% of the reserves in 2003. However, the percentage crept back and had risen above 10% by 2006.

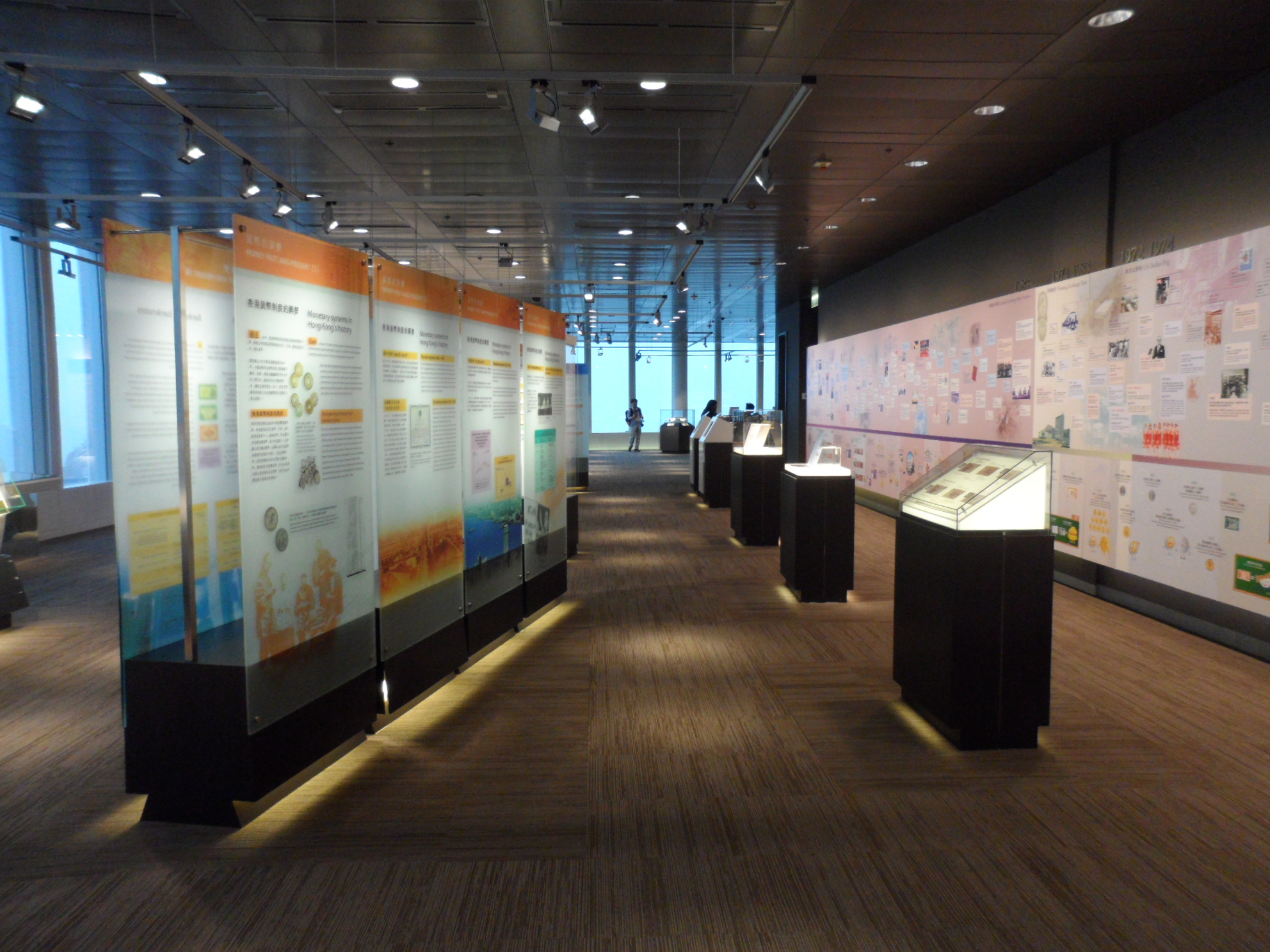
HKMA Information Centre

In August 1998, as part of its wider remit to protect the currency, the HKMA lent the Thai government US$1 billion from the fund as part of a $17 billion bailout organised by the International Monetary Fund (IMF).

== Headquarters ==
The HKMA is headquartered in Tower 2 of the International Finance Centre. It purchased fourteen floors in Tower 2. The 55th, 56th, and the 77th to 88th floors were bought for US$480 million in 2001. An exhibition area currently containing an exhibit of Hong Kong's monetary history, along with a library of the Hong Kong Monetary Authority Information Centre, occupy the 55th floor. The 88th floor of the tower contains the office of the chief executive of the HKMA, and is served by an individual lift.

== Chief executive ==
The Chief Executive is appointed for a five-year term by the Financial Secretary, and is continuously renewable with no term limit.

=== List of chief executives ===
No.	Name (birth–death)	Term of office			Alma mater	Previous role	Financial Secretaries Served
No.	Name (birth–death)	Start of term	End of term	Duration	Alma mater	Previous role	Financial Secretaries Served
1	Joseph Yam Chi-kwong, GBM, GBS, JP 任志剛 (1948–)	1 April 1993	30 September 2009	16 years and 183 days	University of Hong Kong (BSocSc)	Director of the Office of the Exchange Fund	Sir Hamish Macleod; Sir Donald Tsang; Antony Leung; Henry Tang; John Tsang
2	Norman Chan Tak-lam, GBS, JP 陳德霖 (1954–)	1 October 2009	30 September 2019	10 years and 0 days	Chinese University of Hong Kong (B.S.)	Director of the Office of the Hong Kong Chief Executive	John Tsang; Paul Chan
3	Eddie Yue Wai-man, JP 余偉文 (1965–)	1 October 2019	Incumbent	7 years and 35 days	Chinese University of Hong Kong (B.B.A.); University of London (LL.B, M.S.); Harvard University (M.B.A.)	Deputy Chief Executive of the Hong Kong Monetary Authority	Paul Chan

=== Deputy chief executives ===
The chief executive is supported by a number of deputy chief executives, shown below in order of appointment.

1. David Carse (1993–2003)
2. Andrew Sheng (1993–1998)
3. Norman Chan (1996–2005)
4. Anthony Latter (1999–2003)
5. William Ryback (2003–2007)
6. Peter Pang (2004–2016)
7. Choi Yiu-kwan (2005–2009)
8. Eddie Yue (2007–2019)
9. Arthur Yuen (since January 2010)
10. Howard Lee (since February 2016)
11. Edmond Lau (2021–2022)
12. Darryl Chan (since November 2022)

== Events ==
The HKMA hosted the meeting of the World Bank and IMF in 1997, at an estimated cost of HK$485 million. Yam hoped that hosting the event would cement Hong Kong's status as an international financial centre. He added, "The presence of the world's leading finance ministers, central bank governors and top commercial bankers in Hong Kong so soon after the change of sovereignty will help boost international and local confidence in Hong Kong".

The HKMA is also host to the 2022 Global Financial Leaders' Investment Summit.

== See also ==
- Economy of Hong Kong
- Banknotes of the Hong Kong dollar
- Hong Kong Note Printing Limited
- List of central banks
- List of financial supervisory authorities by country
- Asia-Pacific Central Securities Depository Group
- Monetary Authority of Macao
