= Banknotes of the Hong Kong dollar =

Hong Kong dollar
港元 (Chinese)
- Hong Kong

ISO 4217
- Code: HKD (numeric: 344)
- Subunit: 0.01

Units of account
- Symbol: $ or HK$

Denominations
- Banknotes: $10, $20, $50, $100, $150 (commemorative), $500, $1,000

Demographics
- Official user(s): Hong Kong
- Unofficial user: Macau

Issuance
- Monetary authority: Hong Kong Monetary Authority
- Website: www.info.gov.hk/hkma
- Printer: Issuing banks and authority: Government of Hong Kong ($10) The Hong Kong Shanghai Banking Corporation (Hong Kong) Standard Chartered Hong Kong Bank of China (Hong Kong) Note printer: Hong Kong Note Printing Limited:
- Website: www.hknpl.com.hk

The issue of banknotes of the Hong Kong dollar is governed in the Special Administrative Region of Hong Kong by the Hong Kong Monetary Authority (HKMA), the governmental currency board and central bank of Hong Kong. Under licence from the HKMA, three commercial banks issue their own banknotes for general circulation in the region. Notes are also issued by the HKMA itself.

In most countries of the world, the issue of banknotes is handled exclusively by a single central bank or government. The arrangements in Hong Kong are unusual but not unique, as a comparable system is used in the United Kingdom where six commercial banks other than the Bank of England (the central bank of the UK) issue banknotes (three in Scotland and three in Northern Ireland) and Macau where two banks issue banknotes.

Hong Kong dollar banknotes in everyday circulation are issued in denominations of $10, $20, $50, $100, $500 and $1,000. It is common practice for most Hong Kong businesses to reject $1,000 notes due to the risk of counterfeit money.

The total value of banknotes in circulation in Hong Kong can be found in the HKMA Monthly Statistical Bulletin and the HKMA Annual Report.

== History ==
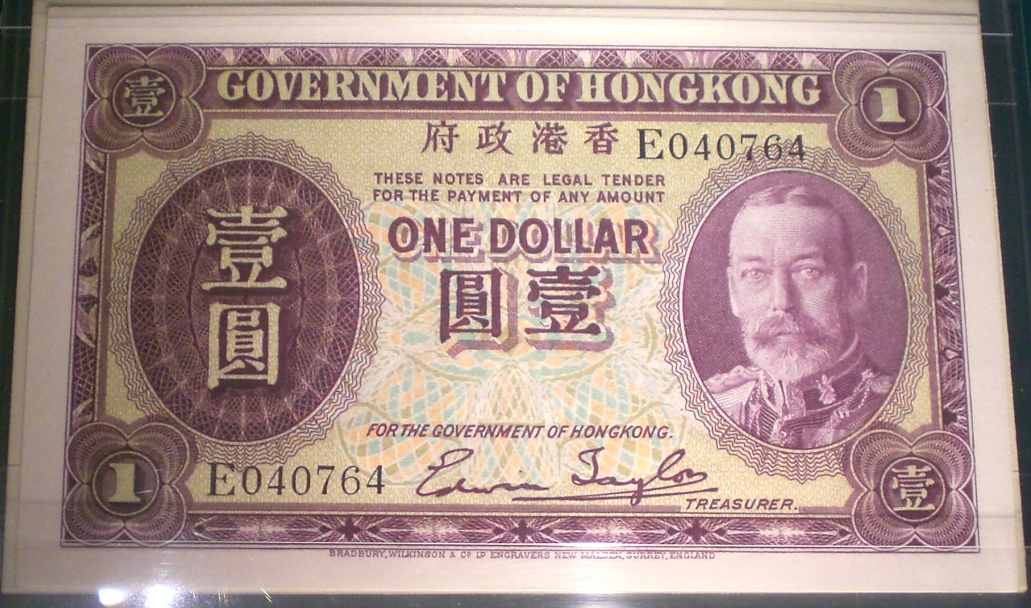
A Hong Kong Government $1 note from 1935

=== Origins till 1900 ===
In the 1860s the Oriental Bank Corporation (now defunct), the Chartered Bank of India, Australia and China (now Standard Chartered Hong Kong) and the Hong Kong and Shanghai Banking Corporation (HSBC) began issuing notes. Denominations issued in the 1860s and 1870s included 1, 5, 10, 25, 50, 100 and 500 dollars. These notes were not accepted by the Treasury for payment of government dues and taxes, although they were accepted for use by merchants. 25-dollar notes did not survive beyond the end of the 19th century, whilst the 1-dollar notes (issued only by the HSBC) were issued until 1935.

=== 20th century ===
Under the Currency Ordinance of 1935, banknotes in denominations of 5 dollars and above issued by the three authorised local banks (the Mercantile Bank of India, London and China, Chartered Bank of India, Australia and China and the Hongkong and Shanghai Banking Corporation) were all declared legal tender. The government took over production of 1-dollar notes. In 1941, the government introduced notes for 1, 5 and 10 cents due to the difficulty of transporting coins to Hong Kong caused by the Second World War (a shipment of 1941 1-cent coins was sunk, making this unissued coin very rare). Just before the Japanese occupation, an emergency issue of 1-dollar notes was made consisting of overprinted Bank of China 5-yuan notes.

In 1945, paper money production resumed essentially unaltered from before the war, with the government issuing notes of 1, 5 and 10 cents and 1 dollar, and the three banks issuing notes of 5, 10, 50, 100 and 500 dollars. 1-dollar notes were replaced by coins in 1960, with only the 1-cent note issued by the government after 1965.

In 1975, the 5-dollar notes were replaced by a coin, whilst 1,000-dollar notes were introduced in 1977. The Mercantile Bank was absorbed by HSBC in 1978 and ceased issuing notes. In 1985, 20-dollar notes were introduced, whilst, in 1993, a 10-dollar coin was introduced and the banks stopped issuing 10-dollar notes. In 1994, the Hong Kong Monetary Authority (HKMA), gave authority to the Bank of China to issue notes.

The 1-cent note issued by the Government was demonetised and ceased to be legal tender on 1 October 1995.

=== 21st century ===
Between 1994 and 2002 an attempt was made to replace privately issued HK$10 notes with coins issued by the government. In response to public demand for the continuation of this note, the HKMA issued its own HK$10 notes. HK$10 banknotes are currently the only denomination issued by the HKMA, having acquired the note printing plant at Tai Po from the De La Rue Group of the UK on behalf of the Government. These notes were printed in paper in 2002 and have been printed in polymer plastic since 2007.

The older (green) 10-dollar banknotes previously issued by two commercial banks are still circulating and remain legal tender, although they are being phased out since September 2005. These are popular for lai see and are noticeably scarce in the run up to Chinese New Year.

Leading to the incorporation of Standard Chartered Hong Kong on 1 July 2004, the Legislative Council of Hong Kong amended the Legal Tender Notes Issue Ordinance. The amendment replaced Standard Chartered Bank with its newly incorporated subsidiary - Standard Chartered Bank (Hong Kong) Ltd - as one of the note-issuing banks in Hong Kong.

== Note-issuing banks ==

Banknotes circulated by four different note issuers
Banknotes circulated by the three different note issuers, 2020
1. The Hongkong and Shanghai Banking Corporation (56.0%)
2. Bank of China (Hong Kong) (33.9%)
3. Standard Chartered Hong Kong (10.1%)

Proportion by value of banknotes issued in 2003

The Government, through the Hong Kong Monetary Authority, authorises three commercial banks to issue currency notes in Hong Kong:

- The Hongkong and Shanghai Banking Corporation Limited;
- the Standard Chartered Bank (Hong Kong) Limited; and
- the Bank of China (Hong Kong) Limited.

Authorisation is accompanied by a set of terms and conditions agreed on between the Government and the three note-issuing banks. In return for their right to issue notes and to provide backing for these notes, the three banks are legally required to hold non-interest bearing Certificates of Indebtedness (CI) issued by the Exchange Fund.

Banknotes are issued by the three banks, or redeemed, against payment to, or from, the Government Exchange Fund in US dollars, at a specified rate of US$1 to HK$7.80 under the Linked Exchange Rate system.

Banknotes issued by the three commercial banks are printed in Hong Kong by Hong Kong Note Printing Limited.

== Note printing ==
In April 1996, the HKMA acquired the note printing plant at Tai Po from the De La Rue Group of the United Kingdom on behalf of the Government. The plant has been operating under the name of Hong Kong Note Printing Limited (HKNPL) since then. The acquisition of the plant enables the Government, through the HKMA, to be directly involved in the production of Hong Kong currency notes, which is in line with the responsibilities conferred upon the Government under the Legal Tender Notes Issue Ordinance and the Basic Law. In March 1997, the Government sold 15 per cent of its shareholding in HKNPL to the China Banknote Printing and Minting Corporation, a People's Republic of China state-owned enterprise. In October 1997, the Government sold 10 per cent of HKNPL issued shares to each of the three note-issuing banks. The Government continues to exercise management control and maintains a majority stake in HKNPL, with the Chief Executive of the HKMA as the chairman of the company.

In 2007, the bank has acquired polymer banknote technology to print the HK$10 banknote.

== Banknotes currently in circulation ==
The HKMA issues the 10-dollar note and the other three banks issue denominations of 20 (blue), 50 (green), 100 (red), 500 (brown) and 1,000 (gold) dollars.

=== 2003 series ===
| Image | Value | Landmark for design | Identifying device |
The Hongkong and Shanghai Banking Corporation series
| | $20 | Victoria Peak; Peak Tram | HSBC lion |
| | $50 | Po Lin Monastery | HSBC lion |
| | $100 | Lantau Link:Tsing Ma Bridge | HSBC lion |
| | $500 | Hong Kong International Airport | HSBC lion |
| | $1,000 | Hong Kong Convention and Exhibition Centre (New wing); Victoria Harbour | HSBC lion |
Bank of China (Hong Kong) series
| | $20 | Peak Tower | Bank of China Tower |
| | $50 | Tsim Sha Tsui Waterfront: Hong Kong Cultural Centre and Space Museum | Bank of China Tower |
| | $100 | Lantau Link:Tsing Ma Bridge | Bank of China Tower |
| | $500 | Hong Kong International Airport | Bank of China Tower |
| | $1,000 | Wan Chai Waterfront: Hong Kong Convention and Exhibition Centre and Central Plaza | Bank of China Tower |
Standard Chartered Hong Kong series
| | $20 | Hong Kong 1850s picture | Chiwen |
| | $50 | Hong Kong 1890s picture | Bixi |
| | $100 | Hong Kong 1930s picture | Qilin |
| | $500 | Hong Kong 1970s picture | Fenghuang |
| | $1,000 | Hong Kong 2000s picture | Chinese dragon |
Government of the Hong Kong Special Administrative Region series
| | $10 (paper) | Geometric design | Horse |
| | $10 (polymer) | Geometric design | Horse |

=== 2010 series ===
| Image | Value | Theme | Mascot for design |
The Hongkong and Shanghai Banking Corporation series
| | $20 | Mid-Autumn Festival | HSBC lion and the HSBC Building |
| | $50 | Spring Lantern Festival | HSBC lion and the HSBC Building |
| | $100 | HKSAR Establishment Day | HSBC lion and the HSBC Building |
| | $500 | Lunar New Year | HSBC lion and the HSBC Building |
| | $1,000 | Dragon Boat Festival | HSBC lion and the HSBC Building |
Bank of China (Hong Kong) series
| | $20 | Repulse Bay | Bank of China Tower |
| | $50 | Tung Ping Chau | Bank of China Tower |
| | $100 | Lion Rock | Bank of China Tower |
| | $500 | High Island Reservoir | Bank of China Tower |
| | $1,000 | Victoria Harbour | Bank of China Tower |
Standard Chartered Hong Kong series
| | $20 | Heritage and technology: Abacus and binary code | Chiwen |
| | $50 | Heritage and technology: Chinese combination lock and vault | Bixi |
| | $100 | Heritage and technology: Sung script seal and printed circuit | Qilin |
| | $500 | Heritage and technology: Traditional face chart and biometrics | Fenghuang |
| | $1,000 | Heritage and technology: Tang dynasty coin and smart chip | Chinese dragon |

=== 2018 series ===
| Image | Value | Theme | Identifying device |
The Hongkong and Shanghai Banking Corporation series—Designed by De La Rue
| | $20 | Tea Culture | HSBC lion and the HSBC Building |
| | $50 | Butterfly and Flowers | HSBC lion and the HSBC Building |
| | $100 | Cantonese Opera | HSBC lion and the HSBC Building |
| | $500 | Hexagonal Rock Columns (Hong Kong UNESCO Global Geopark) | HSBC lion and the HSBC Building |
| | $1,000 | Aerial view of Hong Kong (Financial Metropolis) | HSBC lion and the HSBC Building |
Standard Chartered Hong Kong series—Designed by Giesecke+Devrient
| | $20 | Tea Culture | Standard Chartered Bank Building |
| | $50 | Butterfly and Flowers | Standard Chartered Bank Building |
| | $100 | Cantonese Opera | Standard Chartered Bank Building |
| | $500 | Hexagonal Rock Columns (Hong Kong UNESCO Global Geopark) | Standard Chartered Bank Building |
| | $1,000 | Skyline of Hong Kong, composed by 0s and 1s | Standard Chartered Bank Building |
Bank of China (Hong Kong) series
| | $20 | Tea Culture | Bank of China Tower |
| | $50 | Butterfly and Flowers | Bank of China Tower |
| | $100 | Cantonese Opera | Bank of China Tower |
| | $500 | Hexagonal Rock Columns (Hong Kong UNESCO Global Geopark) | Bank of China Tower |
| | $1,000 | Head in profile, digitalized brain, globe | Bank of China Tower |

== Commemorative banknotes of the Hong Kong dollar ==
In September 2009, Standard Chartered Bank issued the world's first 150-dollar denomination banknote, at its 150th anniversary. Approximately 750,000 notes were sold at above face value, in various combinations and presentations, as a commemorative charity issue. Although legal tender, the notes are unlikely to enter circulation, due to their rarity and expected higher re-sale value.

In 2012, Hong Kong's Bank of China issued a new 100-dollar note to commemorate the bank's 100th anniversary. Although legal tender, the notes aren't intended for circulation. 1,100,000 notes were sold as numismatic products packaged in a folder for HK$150. An additional 100,000 were sold as sets of three uncut notes in a folder for HK$600. Finally, 20,000 uncut sheets of 30 notes each were sold for HK$6,000 each. Profits from the sale of the notes were donated to charitable organizations in Hong Kong.

In 2015, Hongkong and Shanghai Banking Corporation issued their own 150-dollar banknote to commemorative their 150th anniversary. It came in a single note presented in a folder, a 3-in-1 uncut sheet presented in a folder, and a 35-in-1 uncut sheet.

Commemorative banknotes of the Hong Kong dollar
| Year | Value | Image | Front design | Back design |
|---|---|---|---|---|
| 2008 | $20 | | Logo of the Beijing 2008 Summer Olympics; Bank of China Tower (Hong Kong) | National Stadium, Beijing |
| 2009 | $150 | | Standard Chartered Hong Kong 150th anniversary | A group of people representing Hong Kong's history |
| 2012 | $100 | | Bank of China 100th anniversary; headquarters in Beijing; Great Wall of China | Bank of China Tower (Hong Kong) |
| 2015 | $150 | | Hongkong and Shanghai Banking Corporation 150th anniversary; old and current HSBC headquarters; "Phases of growth" and "Faces of growth". | HSBC lions; Hong Kong skyline; "Reflections of growth" and "Security in growth". |
| 2017 | $100 | | Bank of China (Hong Kong)'s 100th anniversary in Hong Kong; Great Wall of China | View of Victoria Harbour from Victoria Peak |
| 2022 | $20 | | Logo of the Beijing 2022 Winter Olympics; Bank of China Tower (Hong Kong) | The 2022 Winter Olympics |

== Historical denominations and issuers ==
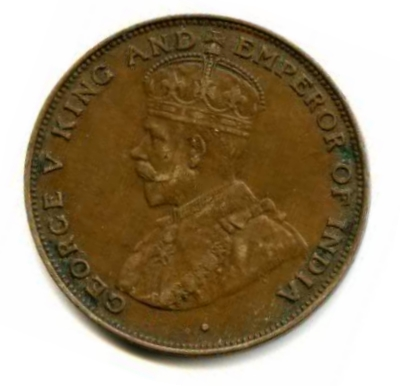
HKD 1 cent denomination (reverse)

Previous issuers of banknotes were Mercantile Bank of India, London and China (1853–1974), Chartered Bank of India, Australia and China (1911–1956), The National Bank of China (1891–1911), Chartered Bank (1956–1982) Oriental Bank Corporation (1845–1884), Agra and Masterman's Bank (1862–1866), The Asiatic Banking Corporation (1862–1866), and The Bank of Hindustan, China & Japan (1862–1866). All issued some or all of the denominations above.

Those no longer issued include the 1, 5, and 10-cent notes along with the 1, 5, and 25-dollar notes.

== Security features ==
The following security features are incorporated into genuine Hong Kong banknotes:

- Paper: The banknote paper is made of 100% cotton fibre, which does not fluoresce under ultraviolet light.
- Polymer: The ten-dollar banknotes are made of polymer, and have a transparent panel.
- Watermarks: The watermarks are incorporated during the paper manufacturing process. They can be viewed equally well from either side of the note. The images are multi-toned and sharp, and do not show up when placed under ultraviolet light.
- Security thread: A straight metal thread is embedded in the note. It can be viewed equally clearly from either side of the note.
- See-through features: When the note is held up to the light, the specially designed colour patterns printed on the front and back will be seen to be exactly aligned with each other.
- Intaglio printing: The main images of the notes are printed by an intaglio process that deposits a large quantity of ink on the paper, conferring a distinctively embossed feel. The fine lines of these images are clear and sharp.

In pursuance to section 103 of the Crimes Ordinance (Cap 200 of Laws of Hong Kong), anyone who wants to reproduce the whole or any part of any Hong Kong currency note for any purpose in any form must apply in writing to the Monetary Authority for approval. No reproduced images should be submitted with the application because such an action would already amount to a breach of section 103 of the Crimes Ordinance. It is a criminal offence under the Crimes Ordinance to manufacture or knowingly pass, tender or possess a counterfeit banknote. Offenders are liable to imprisonment of up to 14 years.

Adopted from the official website of Hong Kong Monetary Authority. Permission granted.
