= Black Saturday (1983) =

Currency crisis in Hong Kong

Black Saturday, 24 September 1983, is the name given to the crisis when the Hong Kong dollar exchange rate versus the United States dollar was at an all-time low. On that day, US$1 exchanged for HK$9.6. For a period, Hong Kong stores began quoting products in US dollar prices, because of the uncertain fluctuation in domestic currency.

== History ==
From November 1974 to October 1983, Hong Kong was under a floating rate regime. The political talks of Hong Kong's handover of sovereignty to China involving UK's Prime Minister Margaret Thatcher's visit to Beijing began to send consumer confidence down in 1982. The stalling of the Sino-British Joint Declaration also contributed to a pessimistic attitude. The collection of events eventually resulted in "Black Saturday”, which came in the form of a currency, banking and fiscal crisis.

== Response ==
The government responded with a linked exchange rate on 17 October 1983.

== See also ==
- Economic bubble
