= Standard Chartered Hong Kong =

Hong Kong financial and banking company

Standard Chartered Bank (Hong Kong) Limited
- Type: Subsidiary
- Industry: Banking
- Founded: First branch on 19 July 1859; 167 years ago; Local incorporation on 12 December 2003; 22 years ago
- Headquarters: 32/F, Standard Chartered Bank Building, Central Hong Kong
- Key people: Benjamin Hung, Greater China CEO; Mary Huen, Hong Kong CEO
- Products: Financial services
- Operating income: ▲HKD27.6 billion (2018)
- Net income: ▲HKD9.7 billion (2018)
- Total assets: ▲HKD1,176 billion (2018)
- Parent: Standard Chartered
- Website: www.sc.com/hk

Standard Chartered Hong Kong (officially Standard Chartered Bank (Hong Kong) Limited, Chinese: 渣打銀行(香港)有限公司) is a licensed bank incorporated in Hong Kong and a subsidiary of Standard Chartered. It is also one of the three commercial banks licensed by the Hong Kong Monetary Authority to issue banknotes for the Hong Kong dollar.

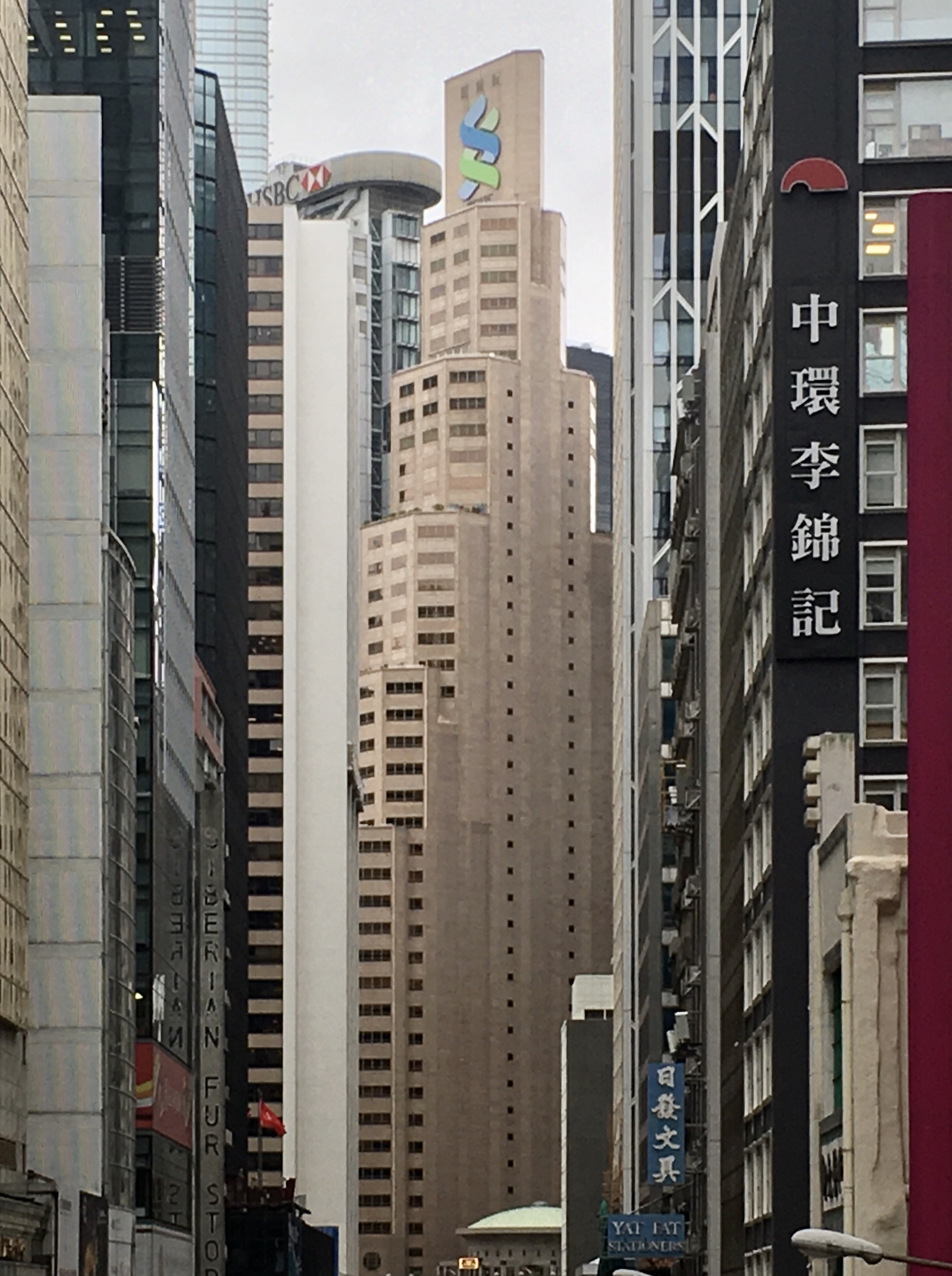
Standard Chartered Bank Building (Hong Kong)

== History ==
The history of Standard Chartered in Hong Kong dates back to 1859, when The Chartered Bank of India, Australia and China opened a branch in Hong Kong. The Bank started issuing banknotes of the Hong Kong dollar in 1862, and still does so today.

In 2000, Standard Chartered acquired Hong Kong–based retail banking business of the Chase Manhattan Bank, including Chase Manhattan Card Company Limited. In 2010, Standard Chartered acquired the Hong Kong consumer operations of GE Capital.

An office tower, the Standard Chartered Bank Building, in Des Voeux Road, Central, Hong Kong is named after the bank. The building is now owned by Hang Lung Group, although the latter's SC main operation office is now located in Millennium City 1, Kwun Tong.

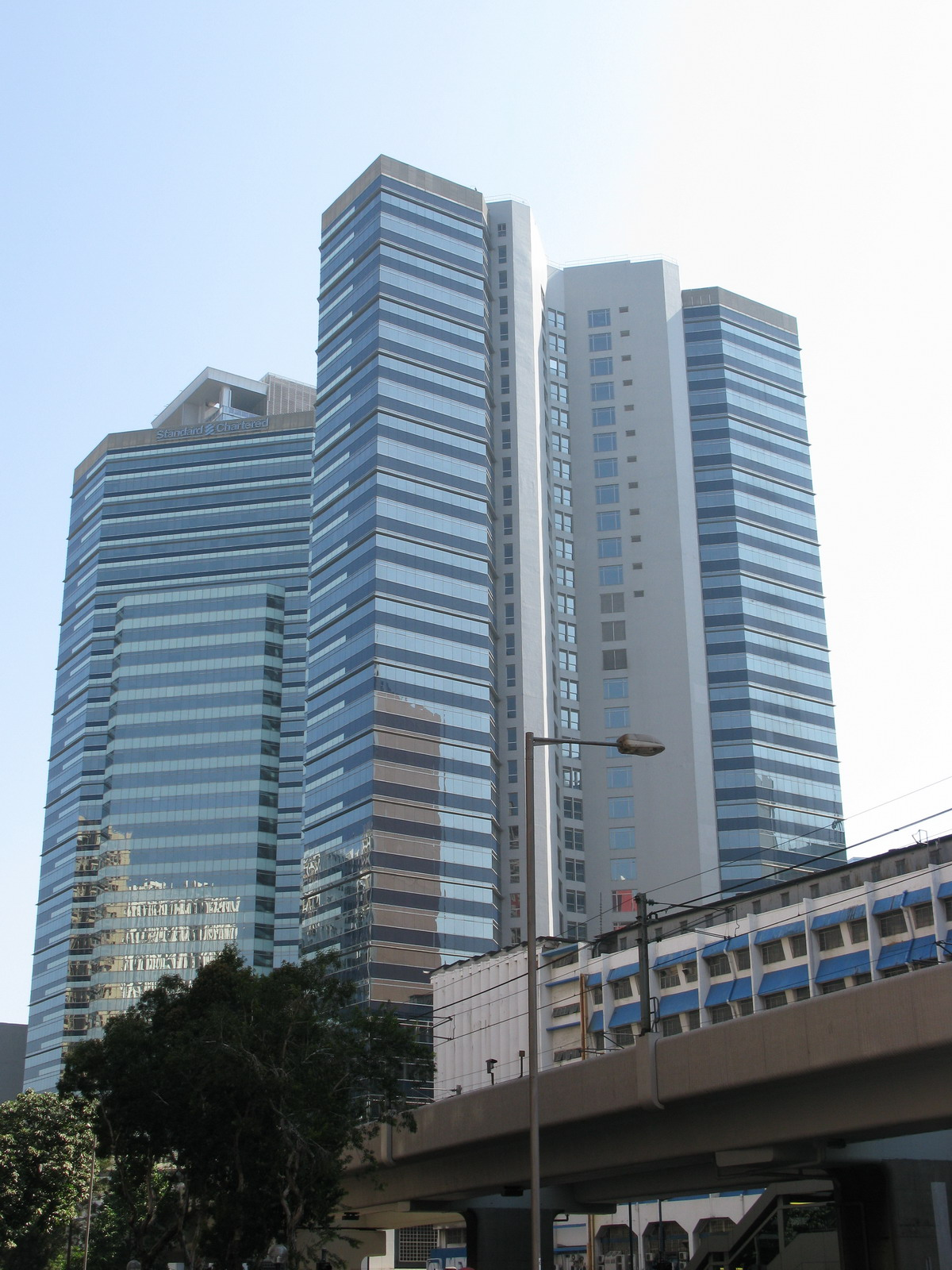
Millennium City 1, also named as Standard Chartered Tower

The Chairperson of the Board is Katherine Tsang, younger sister of former Chief Executive of Hong Kong, Donald Tsang, and formerly chairwoman for Greater China operations. She took up the top job on 1 January 2011, succeeding Chow Chung-Kong, who held the post from 2004.

In January 2022, Standard Chartered announced an agreement to acquire 100% ownership of RBC Investor Services Trust Hong Kong Limited from RBC Investor & Treasury Services, expanding its custodian business to MPF and ORSO schemes trusteeship business in Hong Kong.

In April 2026, Anchorpoint Financial (a joint venture with Standard Chartered Bank (HK), Animoca Brands, and HKT) has been awarded Hong Kong’s one of the first two stablecoin issuer licences by Hong Kong Monetary Authority, the other one being The Hongkong and Shanghai Banking Corporation.

== Local incorporation ==
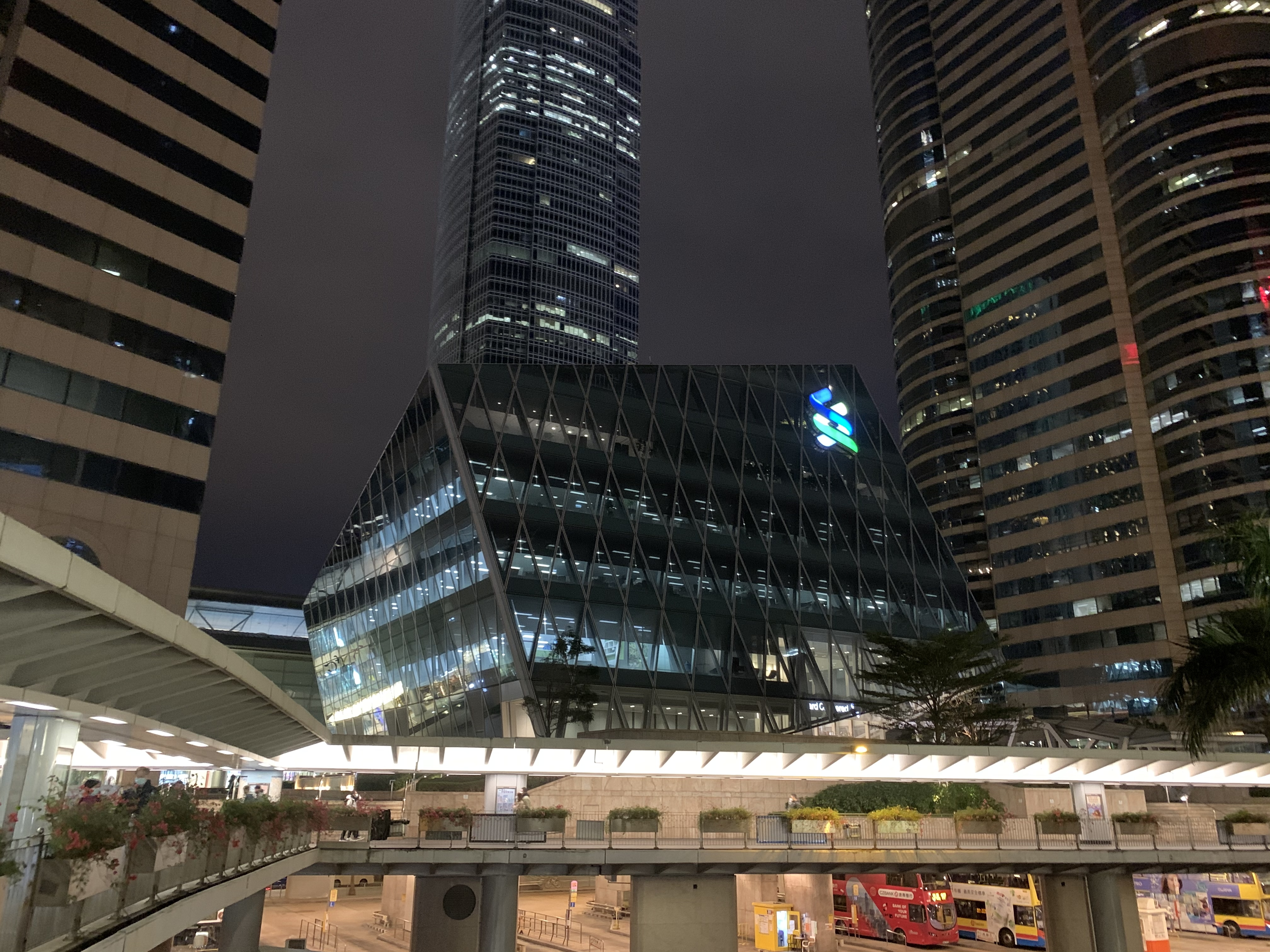
Exchange Square Branch in Central

Standard Chartered (Hong Kong) Ltd was registered in Hong Kong on December 12, 2003 and was renamed Standard Chartered Bank (Hong Kong) Ltd on February 4, 2004. On 1 July 2004, Standard Chartered completed the local incorporation of its Hong Kong businesses, namely the Hong Kong branch of Standard Chartered Bank, Manhattan Card Company Ltd, Standard Chartered Finance Ltd, Standard Chartered International Trade Products Ltd and Chartered Capital Corporation Ltd. The bank operates as a licensed bank in Hong Kong under the name of Standard Chartered Bank (Hong Kong) Ltd.

== Banknotes ==
Standard Chartered Bank (Hong Kong) Limited is one of the three commercial banks licensed by the Hong Kong Monetary Authority to issue banknotes in Hong Kong, the other two being the Bank of China (Hong Kong) and The Hongkong and Shanghai Banking Corporation. The Bank has been issuing banknotes since the 1860s (as The Chartered Bank of India, Australia and China).

Leading to the incorporation of the bank on 1 July 2004, the Legislative Council of Hong Kong amended Legal Tender Notes Issue Ordinance. The amendment replaced Standard Chartered Bank with its newly incorporated subsidiary – Standard Chartered Bank (Hong Kong) Ltd - as one of the note-issuing banks in Hong Kong.

== Leadership ==
- Regional Chief Executive: Benjamin Hung (since October 2015)
- Hong Kong Chief Executive: Mary Huen (since March 2017)

=== List of Former Regional Chief Executives ===
Since the local incorporation of Standard Chartered Bank (Hong Kong) Limited on 1 July 2004.

1. Kaikhushru Shiavax Nargolwala (2004–2007)
2. Jaspal Singh Bindra (2007–2015)

=== List of Former Hong Kong Chief Executives ===
Since the local incorporation of Standard Chartered Bank (Hong Kong) Limited on 1 July 2004.

1. Peter David Sullivan (2004–2007)
2. Benjamin Hung Pi-cheng (2008–2014)
3. May Tan Siew-boi (2014–2017)

== See also ==
- List of banks in Hong Kong
- Standard Chartered
- Hong Kong Marathon
