= Dollar (disambiguation) =

Dollar or dolar is a name for multiple currencies around the world. In a country using a currency named dollar, the word "dollar" (rather than, for example, the correct "Australian dollar") refers to it.

Dollar or Dolar may also refer to:

== Currency ==
- English name of the early modern thaler coins
- Dollar coin, coins of various countries
- Dollar sign, or $
- United States dollar, often referred to as simply "dollar" worldwide

== Places ==
- Dollar, Clackmannanshire, a town in Scotland
  - Dollar Academy, a school in Dollar
- Dollar, Alabama, an unincorporated community
- Dollar, Ontario, Canada, a former community
- Dollar Lake (disambiguation), various lakes in the United States
- Dollar Lakes, three glacial tarns in Nevada
- Dollar Glen, Scotland
- Dollar Law, a hill in Scotland
- Dollar Settlement, Michigan, an unincorporated community
- Dólar, municipality in Spain

== Entertainment ==
- Dollar (film), a 1938 film by Gustaf Molander
- Dollars (film), a 1971 motion picture also known as $
  - Dollars (soundtrack)
- The Dollars Trilogy, three films by Sergio Leone
- The Dollar, the original title for Philip Barry's play Holiday
- Dollars, an internet-based anonymous gang in the Durarara!! light novels and anime
- Dollar Comics, a line of DC Comics
- Dollar, the dog owned by Richie Rich
- Dollar (TV series), a Lebanese Arabic-language web television series

== Music ==
- Dollar (group), a pop vocal duo from the UK who had a series of hit records in the late 1970s and 1980s
- The Dollar (album), a 2006 album by country music artist Jamey Johnson
  - "The Dollar" (song), a 2005 single from this album
- "Dollar" (song), a 2019 song by Becky G and Myke Towers

== Businesses ==
- Dollar Rent A Car, an American car rental firm
- Dollar Bank, a regional bank serving Pennsylvania and Ohio
- Dollar Savings Bank, a defunct bank founded in New York City in 1890
- Dollar Financial Group, a US-based financial services group
- Dollar Steamship Company, established by Robert Dollar

== Other uses ==
- Dollar (surname)
- Dollar (motorcycle), a French-made motorcycle
- Sand dollar, a close cousin of the sea urchin
- Battle of Dollar, fought in 875 at Dollar, Scotland
- Dollar (reactivity), a term used in nuclear chain reaction kinetics
- Dollar was a Thoroughbred racehorse and sire. He best known as the principal conduit to extend the Byerley Turk sire line to the present day.

== See also ==
- $ (disambiguation)
- Dollar store
