= Mariya Ocher =

Israeli singer, poet and artist (born 1986)

Mary (Mariya) Ocher
- self portrait, January 2011

Background information
- Born: November 10, 1986 (age 39); Moscow, Russia
- Genres: Avant pop; experimental; post-punk; art rock; garage punk; folk
- Instruments: Vocals; electric guitar; acoustic guitar; synthesizer; piano; keyboard
- Years active: 2006 – present
- Labels: Haute Areal; Buback Tonträger; Related Records; Hairy Spider Legs; Klangbad; Sing A Song Fighter; Underground Institute
- Website: maryocher.com

Mary Ocher ("Oh-chur") is a recording artist, performer, poet, director and visual artist.

== Personal life ==
Ocher was born Mariya Ocheretianskaya on November 10, 1986 (Russian: Мария Очеретянская, Hebrew: מאריה אוצ'רטיאנסקי) in Moscow. She legally changed her last name to Ocher at age 18.

An only child to a voice- and puppet theater actor (of the Obraztsov theater) father and an unemployed engineer mother, both of Jewish/Ukrainian descent. Her family immigrated to Israel in 1991 at the height of the Gulf War, first to a kibbutz in Negev and several months later to Tel Aviv where she grew up and lived until the age of 20.

She was forced to change her name to Miriam for several years while attending a religious Jewish school, from which she nearly got expelled. In false hope for scholarly artistic recognition, she continued on to a secular art high school to study film, which she then left, disillusioned with the education system at the beginning of the 12th grade to pursue music.

Ocher's maternal grandmother, Julia's, late husband is the Russian-Jewish historian/author Natan Eidelman. Alix, Mary's father, was named after an SS officer who saved his father's life during WWII. Her mother, Elena took part in the mapping of the moon in the 1970s in Moscow.

Acutely aware of the prevalent nationalistic narrative in her surrounding, along with early childhood experiences growing up a migrant in an acutely xenophobic environment, Mary's work was tinged with a political undertone from the very beginning.

== Music ==
Mary started writing songs as a child. Her first studio recording was at the age of 14 with Idan Raichel.

By 19 she formed Mary and The Baby Cheeses in Tel Aviv; A raw folk-punk combo featuring, among other instruments, a theremin and a metal heater for percussion. The band soon gained a small cult following within the local music press and among other musical projects from the circuit. Within two years the band relocated to Berlin, where Mary remained. In its Berlin reincarnation, the band produced several DIY releases. Their tour merchandise included silk screen-printed socks and b-stock dildos salvaged from a sex toy factory dumpster.

Mary's first solo release originally came out on CDR and was sold on the streets, where she used to perform age 20-23. War Songs was eventually re-recorded at a recording studio and released on "Haute Areal". The album was shortly followed by a limited edition untitled white 7", which sold out quickly.

Her second solo album, EDEN, recorded with King Khan of King Khan and the Shrines and The King Khan and BBQ Show came out on Buback in 2013.

EDEN ranked No. 12 in Intro Magazine's list of Albums of The Year of 2013.

Her third full length release, the debut album with her two drummers "Mary Ocher + Your Government" was released on the legendary krautrock/experimental label Klangbad (led by Faust (band)'s Hans Joachim Irmler).

Its follow-up "The West Against The People" was recorded at the Faust Studio with Irmler and released shortly after. The album features an essay analysing the sociopolitical climate at the time, it also features collaborations with Die Toedliche Doris and Felix Kubin. A special edition of the album grants access to further tracks that were revealed gradually throughout 2017.

The album was initially announced in Fact, with the tag line: "Prediction: one of the best albums of 2017". Bandcamp listed the album #51 on their "100 Best Albums of 2017". The second edition of the record was pressed within three months of its release and Ocher went on to perform in some 30 countries within 2 years of its release.

The video for "Arms", one of the album's singles, caused a minor controversy with its imagery of Israeli soldiers wandering casually in public spaces and posing with their guns, it was nominated for a MuVi award at Oberhausen film festival (2017), and selected for the Cologne Women's Film Festival (2018).

"The Faust Studio Sessions and Other Recordings" followed shortly, featuring collaborations with Hans Unstern, and Julia Kent on a Robbie Basho cover.

The first new Mary Ocher release since the pandemic was "Approaching Singularity: Music for The End of Time", recorded at Palazzo Stabile in the north of Italy and mixed with Mike Lindsay of Tunng in Margate. The recordings feature collaborations with Barry Burns of Mogwai, composer Roberto Cacciapaglia, Red Axes, and a homage to Delia Derbyshire. The album is accompanied by a 9 page essay on the future of humanity, determinism and identity politics. Followed shortly after by "Your Guide to Revolution", its sister release, recorded at the same sessions and released along with the text "A Guide to Radical Living - A no nonsense guide to living comfortably with just enough: Why wealth needs poverty and how not to play along". "Your Guide" featured variations on Dorothy Ashby's "The Rubaiyat", based on the poetry of Omar Khayyam, the record was chosen by The Quietus as "Album of The Week", by Bandcamp as one of the best records of the year, and received the German Record Critics' Award as The Best Album in the Electronic/Experimental category. The two albums were soon followed by a collection of b-sides and remixes titled "Palazzo Stabile Sessions: Remixes and B-sides" released July 5, 2024.

== Releases ==
- Weimar (2026, 10"/digital, Underground Institute)
- Palazzo Stabile Sessions: Remixes and B-sides (2024, a collection of rarities, digital)
- Your Guide to Revolution (2024, LP/digital, Underground Institute)
- Approaching Singularity: Music for The End of Time (2023, LP/CD/digital, Underground Institute)
- Power and Exclusion From Power (2023, digital EP (Underground Institute))
- MOOP! (an autobiographical comic book, drawn by 23 international artists - 2020, Underground Institute)
- Faust Studio Sessions and Other Recordings (2017, 10"/digital: Klangbad/Sing A Song Fighter, Tape: Related Records)
- The West Against The People (2017, LP/CD/digital, Klangbad)
- Arms / remixed (2017, remixes compilation, digital)
- Mary Ocher + Your Government – Self-titled (2016, LP/CD/digital, Klangbad)
- 7" – Man VS. Air/Thunderbird (2015, double A-side, limited edition vinyl W/ Your Government)
- The Fictional Biography of Mary Ocher– The home recordings (2006–2015 - double anthology) (2015, digital)
- I, Human (remixes EP) (2014, digital, Buabck)
- EDEN (2013/2014, second edition: 2015) (EU: Buback(CD, digital), Haute Areal(LP) US: Hairy Spider Legs(CD), Related Records(TAPE))
- 7" (2012) (aka "Man of 1000 faces") (limited edition vinyl, Haute Areal)
- War Songs (2011, CD/digital, Haute Areal)

== Special shows and appearances ==
Interview Magazine (German edition) chose Ocher as their Superstar of October 2013 (offline).

ARTE's Into The Night with Ocher and Sasha Grey (2013)

A couple Mary's tracks are featured in the horror film Ava's Possessions, the soundtrack of which was curated by Sean Lennon.

The series Between Two Drummers, a friendly nod to Between Two Ferns was created as part of Mary Ocher + Your Government album promo. Among the guests were Nina Hynes, Ned Collette and Molly Nilsson.

SWR's production Art's Birthday televised a full length performance of Mary Ocher + Your Government premiering new tracks live (2019).

A sold-out show with Your Government at the Deutsche Oper Berlin, followed by sold out shows at SO36 and Berghain Kantine.

Along many solo and band tours (incl. a 9 week / 50 date North American tour), Mary toured Australia with Ned Collette + Wirewalker and Germany with 1000 Robota, The Great Hans Unstern Swindle, Die Goldenen Zitronen and German bestseller author Sibylle Berg, alongside actors Katja Riemann and Matthias Brandt to promote Berg's book Vielen dank für das Leben ("Many Thanks for Life"). Other shows were alongside Silver Apples, Kirin J. Callinan, Lucrecia Dalt and many others.

"Your Guide to Revolution" was featured as "Album of The Week" by The Quietus and listed as an Essential Release and "Best Albums of Spring 2024" by Bandcamp.

Selected festivals: SXSW, Reeperbahn, CTM, Fusion, Pop Montreal, Le Guess Who (curated by Animal Collective), Steirischer Herbst.

== Other work: Writing, art, film and other ==
2008-2014: The Sounds of Softness music documentary about a fictional late-1970s avant-garde movement, co-directed with French filmmaker Julien Binet. A project with a variety of collaborators and guest appearances, amongst which members of Malaria!, Einstürzende Neubauten and Cluster (band) as well as Hanin Elias, formerly of Atari Teenage Riot and authors Ken Shakin and François Jonquet.

2009: A multitude of Mary Ocher poems published in various poetry anthologies (2009-2011), later to be collected into a limited edition booklet sold at shows. The Origins of Evil, a photography project, published in several online and printed magazines. Ocher curated The Queens and The Rebels (of Unpopular Culture) - Festival for theatrical music/performance art and multimedia at the legendary Tacheles complex in Berlin. Its second edition was held the following year. She also curated The 15 Minutes Festival performance action in Tel Aviv.

2011: Lomography, "LomoAmigo" solo photography exhibition in Berlin. Group exhibition Zum Schein at the Neurotital gallery/Berlin, and another at Quai de la Batterie in Arras, France. Site-specific installation Restaurant in Bethanien, Berlin.

2014: A video retrospective of Ocher's work shown at Berlin's Galeire Nord, as part of "A Room of One's Own" exhibition. One-off video exhibition with own art collective Autodiktat.

2015: Ocher's Dogme 95 inspired short Pawnshop Santa wins award at Berlin's underground film festival, Boddinale.

2017: Mary is commissioned to write a soundtrack for chosen films as part of the International Film Festival of Ghent, the films: Ballet Mechanique and the Triadisches Ballett, performed with two synthesizers, vocal effects, a self made flute and a piano – using the bare strings and pedals as percussion. Commissioned to perform John Cage's 4"33 at Berlin's Haus der Kulturen der Welt.

2018: Performance of a one-off collaboration on pieces by fusion jazz harpist Dorothy Ashby with the drummers (Your Government) and legendary Mbira player Stella Chiweshe. Mary narrates a surrealist 16mm art film inspired by waterbears by the title "The Hot & The Cold" by artist duo Anja Dornieden and Juan David Gonzalez Monroy, to be screened in 3D, with special light, smoke and sound effects.

2021: Ocher is commissioned to write a sound piece for the contemporary music festival Podium. The result: "Unbetrothed Virgins, Incest, Rape : A study of the old testament in 7 movements" can be heard on location in Esslingen via GPS, as well as online. Misc: Over the years Mary directed a multitude of music videos for other artists, as well as her various projects, in addition to the documentaries All of my problems are imaginary (but my friends are real) and Love Starvation Economy (aka 13 Conversations About Love) featuring interviews and conversations. Many of Ocher's various video-art pieces with original music and texts, photography, typography and drawings are available online on various platforms. 2020–2022

During the pandemic no new Mary Ocher music is released, but the autobiographical comic book MOOP!

In 2020 Mary performed at the first larger scale (300 capacity) socially-distanced music event in Berlin at Haus der Kulturen der Welt, opposite the German parliament. Shortly after, she hosted a mental health support session for musicians, as part of an online event.

In 2021 she starred in Bela Brillowska's experimental short "A Woman in Bed With Radio", debuting some of her then unreleased new recordings. She also contributed music to the animated short "Tako Tsubo" which premiered at Berlinale and continued to do the festival rounds.

She is the founder of the artist platform Underground Institute, and remains its creative director. The UI features artists Limpe Fuchs, Martin Rev of Suicide (band), M Lamar, Ya Tosiba among others. Its radio series "Underground Institute Picks" runs in collaboration with Dublab (LA), Jolt Radio (Miami), Soho Radio and Resonance FM (London), Reboot.fm (Berlin) and more. UI Picks episodes have been curated by cult and underground artists including Paddy Steer, Lydia Lunch, members of Chicks on Speed, and Vanishing Twin, owner of the legendary Voodoo Rhythm Records, Reverend Beat-Man and many others.

2022: Ocher co-curated The Underground Institute Festival with Manu Louis. Featuring live performances, DJ sets, sound pieces, talks and workshops (with artists Limpe Fuchs, Lolina, Alexandra Cardenas, KMRU, Xiu Xiu, Martin Rev and others).

== Charity ==
Ocher took part in Voices – a series of German fundraiser events for Physicians for Human Rights in Gaza, GENESIS show for The Art of Elysium charity for a children's hospital in LA, to which she was invited by Karen O and Rain Phoenix, alongside SoKo, Moses Sumney, Ariel Pink, Moby and Cat Power.

Releases: "For Belarus" compilation, "Arms" Remixes EP (charity release for asylum seekers), "Power and Exclusion from Power" EP (charity release for humanitarian aid in Ukraine) and curation of UI compilation "Hope for Her Future" for Afghan Women's access to education (in collaboration with Afghan Women's Association, Hamburg).
