= King Khan (musician) =

Canadian musician/producer/artist/writer

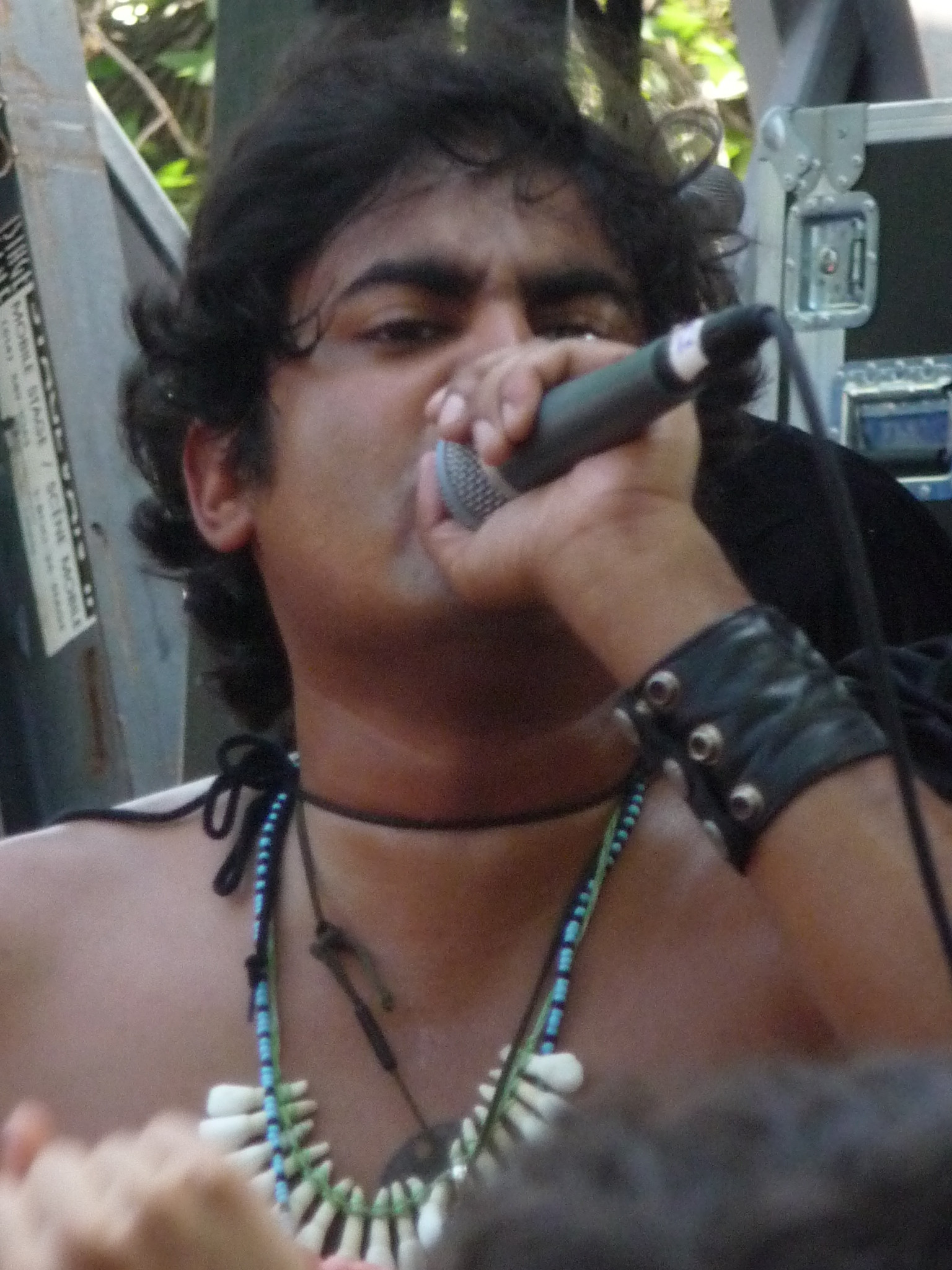
- King Khan performing in 2008

Background information
- Also known as: Blacksnake
- Born: Arish Ahmad Khan; January 24, 1977 (age 49); Montreal, Quebec, Canada
- Origin: Montreal, Quebec
- Genres: Garage rock; garage punk; rhythm and blues; psychedelic rock
- Occupation: Musician
- Instruments: Vocals; guitar
- Years active: 1995–present
- Website: kingkhanmusic.com

Arish Ahmad Khan (born January 24, 1977), better known by his stage name King Khan, is a Canadian musician, producer, artist and writer from Montreal, Quebec. He is best known as the frontman of King Khan and the Shrines and for being one half of The King Khan & BBQ Show.

== Career ==
Khan was born in Montreal to an Indo-Canadian family.

=== The Spaceshits (1995–1999) ===
The Spaceshits were established in mid-1995, featuring lead vocalist Mark Sultan, who was previously the drummer in a band called Powersquat in the Montreal suburb of Chateauguay. From late 1994, Khan had been in a Black Flag and Pavement-influenced band known as the Maury Povitch 3, a band that existed until its demise some time in 1996. In August 1995, following several lineup changes, he also became the Spaceshits' bassist and for several months would play shows for both bands. The Spaceshits inherited Powersquat's reputation for violent stage shows. At first, sets lasted no longer than 10 to 15 minutes, during which the band or members of the audience would create disturbances, at times including fireworks or food fights. Eventually the band's raucous live shows would lead them to be effectively blacklisted from many venues in Montreal, particularly after an April 8, 1996 set in support of the New Bomb Turks. Another notable incident occurred on April 30, 1999, just before the beginning of a European tour, while the band was promoting a new Sultan Records release. As the first act, the Scat Rag Boosters, was performing, the venue's owners got into an altercation with Khan, injuring his hand and leading to the destruction of a television. This incident caused the two remaining bands, Lyle Sheraton and the Daylight Lovers, as well as the Spaceshits, to refuse to play, and they encouraged the audience to seek refunds. This event marked the end of the band's booking in Montreal.

The Spaceshits went on to complete a European tour; one which would prove to be the last for the band. After the European tour had ended, Khan opted to stay behind. Rather than continue on without him, the band members broke up, believing both that the band had run its course, and that Khan had been like a brother to them and so replacing him would have been impossible.

During his Spaceshits years, Khan became closely involved with a host of bands in the Montreal scene. These included The Irritations, The Infernos, Lyle Sheraton and the Daylight Lovers, the latter two that included Paul Spence, as well as The Scat Rag Boosters. He starred in short movies such as Enchiladas de Amore and the unfinished Count Crackula and the Cocaine Kid, in which he featured alongside Spence. He also wrote for the weekly Montreal Mirror mainly as a music critic, interviewing musicians and performing such stunts as travelling around Montreal nightspots disguised as a chicken. He also wrote articles for Vice magazine.

=== King Khan and the Shrines (1999–present) ===
King Khan and the Shrines was established in the latter part of 1999 as Sultan started another Montreal-based band, Les Sexareenos. The original lineup of the (Sensational) Shrines consisted of King Khan on vocals and guitars, Mr. Speedfinger on guitar, Boom Boom Jennes on bass, John Boy Adonis on "big beat," Sam Cook on trumpet, Ron Streeter (who formerly played for Curtis Mayfield, Stevie Wonder, and Al Jarreau) on percussion, Ben Ra on saxophone, and Mr. Tom Bone on trombone. Eccentric French organist Fredovitch joined the lineup a week before the group recorded their first album at Toe Rag Studios in London.

The band have released eight studio albums since their inception, including The Supreme Genius of King Khan and the Shrines in June 2008 and Idle No More in September 2013.

=== The King Khan & BBQ Show (2002–present) ===
Following the Spaceshits' demise, Sultan started another Montreal-based band, Les Sexareenos, before venturing off on his own in 2002 as the one-man band BBQ. Visiting Khan at his home in Kassel, Germany, they quickly developed a new act featuring Khan and Sultan as his one-man band BBQ playing together, then becoming The King Khan and BBQ Show.

The band's debut album, The King Khan & BBQ Show LP was released in September 2004, followed by What's for Dinner? in October 2006, then Invisible Girl in November 2009.

The King Khan and BBQ Show broke up in June 2010, but quickly reunited in 2011 and began touring and releasing music again. Their fourth and most recent album is Bad News Boys, released in March 2015.

=== Almighty Defenders (2009–2010) ===
On Black Lips' 2009 tour of India, following an incident at a rowdy show in which Cole Alexander kissed fellow bandmember Ian St. Pé and exposed his private parts on-stage, the band fled the country while rumors of their arrests circulated the internet. The tour was canceled and the group members fled to Khan's home in Berlin, Germany. Over the course of eight days, they recorded eleven tracks with Khan and his King Khan & BBQ Show bandmate Mark Sultan.

On June 17, 2009, the full group made its live debut, performing a set in choir robes at the North by Northeast festival. Vice Records released The Almighty Defenders' self-titled debut album on September 22, 2009.

=== Other projects ===
Khan has, in his Moon Studios and elsewhere, collaborated and recorded with friends and people he respects; as he told an interviewer, he records only people he loves.

In 2001, Khan and Jasper Hood of the Moorat Fingers became The Black Jaspers, under which they recorded an album released in 2009 on In The Red Records.

In 2009, Khan collaborated with Bloodshot Bill, releasing a record under the name the Tandoori Knights. The following year in October 2010, a Tandoori Knights LP "Curry Up" was released followed by an EP called "Amon Ra Bless America" from a new project called Vomit Squad reuniting him with Spaceshits' drummer "Skid" Marks and others from the Montreal scene from which he came. In November 2011, during the first Tandoori Knights' North American tour, he announced that new releases were soon to come from both Tandoori Knights and the Black Jaspers.

In March 2010, Sub Pop released "The Fiery Tears of St. Laurent" by both Khan and Pat Meteor. Meteor is best known for his work with The Demon's Claws, a Montreal-based band with which Khan has worked, and part of Khan's "death cult".

In June 2011, Khan announced a new country music-inspired project with Jeff Clarke of The Demon's Claws called Khanwood Clarke.

In June 2013, the album he produced for outsider torch singer Mary Ocher was released on Hamburg's Buback records.

==== Film soundtracks ====
In 2005, Khan made his first film soundtrack for Schwarze Schafe, directed by Oliver Rihs. It wouldn't be until eleven years later, in 2016, that he would score another film, Back To Nothing, directed by Miron Zownir. Two years later in 2018, Khan was asked by Rapid Eye Movies to replace two soul songs in the film Blue Film Woman, directed by Kan Mukai, a soft core Japanese "Pink Film" made in 1969, restored and to be re-released in 2019. In 2019, he scored and was music supervisor for a documentary film about civil rights, The Invaders, directed by Prichard T. Smith.

==== Live Performances with GZA (2009) ====
In 2009, Khan collaborated with New York City-based rapper GZA of the Wu-Tang Clan. The two musicians performed together in 2009 at both the North by Northeast festival in Toronto, Canada and the Fun Fun Fun Fest in Austin, Texas. GZA gave Khan his Wu-name, "Lord Khan".

==== Black Power tarot ====
In 2014, King Khan had the vision to celebrate Black Power using the mystic language of tarot. He chose 26 African American people who he felt followed a true path of illumination despite being born in a country that was so corrupt with racism and vehemently against them. Khan had studied the tarot over a decade and was given a deck of the Tarot de Marseilles by Alejandro Jodorowsky while he visited him at his home. Jodorowsky's personal teachings paved the way for Khan to understand the tarot much deeper than ever before. The mission behind the "Black Power Tarot" was to add a heavy dose of surrealistic mythos to American history by replacing the archetypes of the Major Arcana with the chosen people thus giving the world a new deck. Khan shared this vision with Belfast artist Michael Eaton who then came up with the drawings. Khan provided him with many specific design instructions to stay true to the sacred geometry of the Marseilles deck, so that this deck could be used in the same way. Khan then presented the drawings to Jodorowsky, who was asked to approve of each one. Jodorowsky approved 17 of the 22 cards in the first round. Khan & Eaton made the proper changes to the 5 remaining cards until they finally received Jodo's blessings and the supreme honour of being two of his spiritual warriors.

==== Khannibalism ====
In August 2015, Khan announced the creation of his own record label Khannibalism, a joint venture between himself and Ernest Jenning Record Co. The label has released a series of four singles from the soundtrack to the film The Invaders, as well as full-length albums from William S. Burroughs, Khan, Black Lips (with the Khan Family) and Saba Lou, Khan's daughter.

==== Louder Than Death ====
In 2018, King Khan started a new punk rock collective called Louder Than Death. The first release on In The Red Records featured long time collaborators Sean and Erin Spits (from The Spits), Drew Owen (Sick Thoughts) and Saba Lou. King Khan then recruited Magnetix and Fredovitch from Bordeaux, France to back him up and they recorded the "Stop Und Fick Dich", released in 2019 by In The Red Records.
