= Silver dollar =

Silver dollar is a dollar coin made of silver or any white metal. See:

- Spanish dollar
- Dollar coin (United States)
- Dollar (Hong Kong coin)
- Canadian silver dollar

Silver dollar or dollar may also refer to:

- Silver certificate (United States)
- Silver dollar, a North American–style pancake.
- Silver dollar (fish), a name given to various fish species.

== Geography ==
- Silver Dollar, Ontario, a community in Ontario, Canada.
- Silver Dollar City, a theme park in Missouri, United States.

== People ==
- Sylvestro Carolla, New Orleans gangster known as "Silver Dollar".
- James Marion West, Jr., Texas oilman known as "Silver Dollar Jim" for throwing coins to passersby on the street.

== Entertainment ==
- Silver Dollar (film), a 1932 film starring Edward G. Robinson.
- "Silver Dollar", hit song sung by Teresa Brewer

== See also ==
- Dollar coin
- Silver coin
- Eucalyptus cinerea, the silver dollar tree
- Lunaria, the silver dollar plant
