= Dollard =

Dollard may refer to:

- Dollard (electoral district), in Quebec, Canada
- Dollard (name)
- Dollard, Saskatchewan, a community in Canada
- Dollart or Dollard, a bay on the border of the Netherlands and Germany

== See also ==
- Dollard-des-Ormeaux, colloquially referred to as "Dollard", a city in the West Island
- Dollard-Des Ormeaux–Roxboro, a former borough in the West Island area of Montreal, Quebec, Canada
- Pierrefonds—Dollard, a federal electoral district in Quebec, Canada
- Dollar (disambiguation)
