= Kess Film =

German film and TV production company

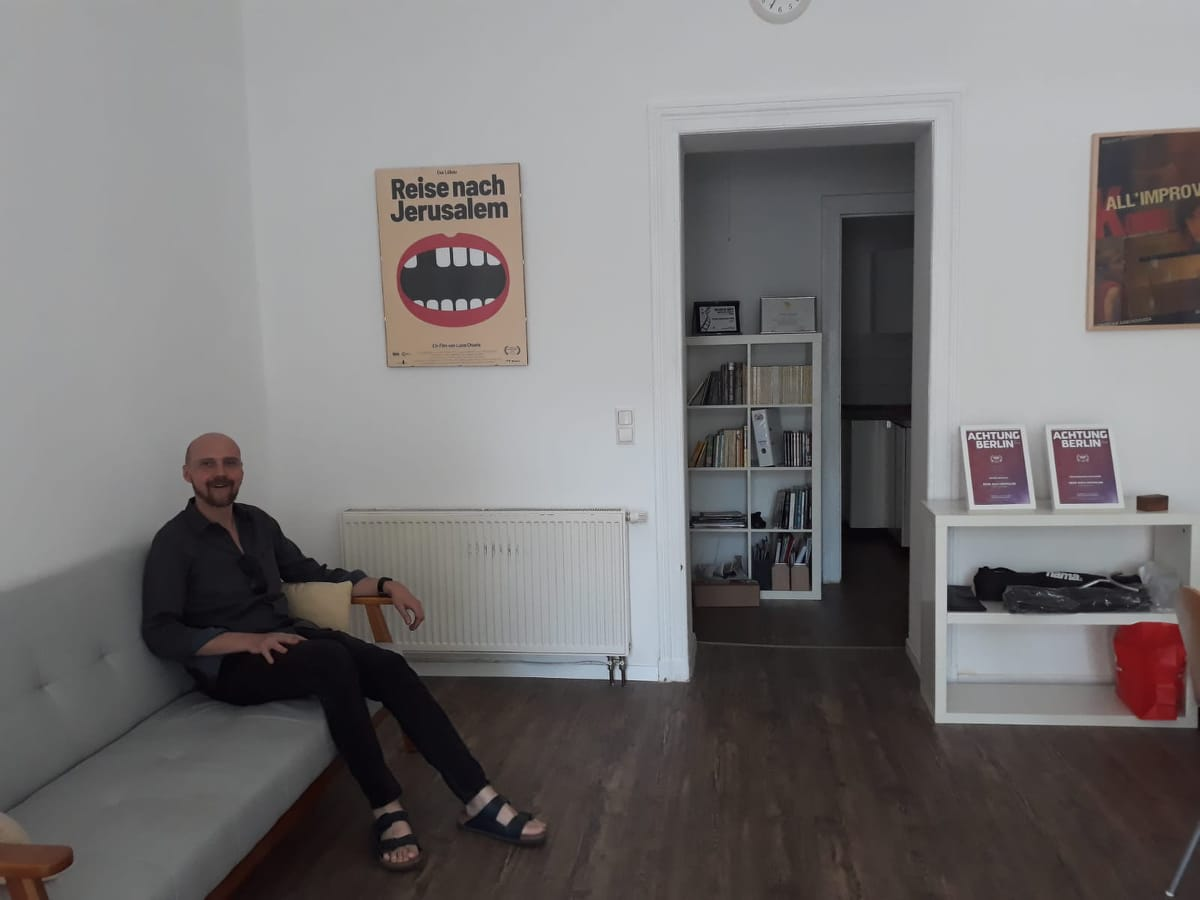
- Type: Film production company
- Industry: Film
- Founded: 2014
- Founder: Giulio Baraldi
- Headquarters: Berlin, Germany
- Services: Television series, Art House Film

Kess Film is a production company founded in 2014 in Berlin, Germany by Italian producer, screenwriter and actor Giulio Baraldi. Its primary aim is to assist young directors and screenwriters in the process of realizing TV series and Art House films from the start of preparation onwards.

== Reise nach Jerusalem ==
Reise nach Jerusalem (The Chairs Game) is a feature film directed by Lucia Chiarla starring German actress Eva Löbau. It was produced by Kess Film and released in German cinemas on November 15, 2018. The film won the awards for Best Film and Best Actress at Achtung Berlin Film Festival and for Best Film at the 7th Boddinale Film Festival.

== Giulio Baraldi ==
Giulio Baraldi ( Born April 2, 1971, in Milan) is primary a stage actor and founder of Kess Film. He also acted in film productions like Tale Padre, Shooting, A casa nostra and Chemical Hunger in 2003. His credits as a screenwriter and producer include Suddenly Komir and the documentary film Dust: The Wanted Life released on November 22, 2015.
