= Jonquet =

Jonquet is a French surname. Notable people with the surname include:

- François Jonquet (born 1961), French writer, novelist, art critic and film critic
- Robert Jonquet (1925–2008), French footballer
- Thierry Jonquet (1954–2009), French writer

== See also ==
- Jonquet (minor planet)
