= Love You So =

Love You So may refer to:

- "Love You So" (Delilah song), 2011
- "Love You So" (Ron Holden song), 1959
- "Love You So", a song by the King Khan & BBQ Show from the 2004 album The King Khan & BBQ Show LP

== See also ==
- Love You So Much, a 2000 studio album by Kelly Chen
