= What's for Dinner? (album) =

Studio album by The King Khan & BBQ Show
- Released: October 10, 2006
- Genre: Garage rock, doo wop
- Label: In the Red

The King Khan & BBQ Show chronology
The King Khan & BBQ Show LP (2004)	What's for Dinner? (2006)	Invisible Girl (2009)

Professional ratings
Review scores
Source	Rating
AllMusic	4/5 stars

What's for Dinner? is the second studio album by garage rock band The King Khan & BBQ Show. The album was recorded in 2005 and released on October 10, 2006.

== Track listing ==
All lyrics are written by King Khan and Mark Sultan

Side one
No.	Title	Lead vocals	Length
1.	"Treat Me Like a Dog"	Sultan	3:55
2.	"I'll Never Belong"	Sultan	3:52
3.	"Zombies"	Khan	2:08
4.	"Dock It #8"	Khan	2:52
5.	"Why Don't You Lie?"	Sultan	4:18
6.	"Captain Captain"	Khan	4:35
7.	"Too Much in Love"	Khan	3:20

Side two
No.	Title	Lead vocals	Length
1.	"Learn My Language"	Khan	0:15
2.	"Blow My Top"	Sultan	3:50
3.	"Into the Snow"	Sultan	3:16
4.	"Operation"	Khan	1:33
5.	"The Ballad Of..."	Sultan	2:45
6.	"What's for Dinner"	Khan	2:27
7.	"Suck It and Smell"	Instrumental	2:31
