= C$ =

C$ may refer to:

- Administrative share, hidden network shares in Microsoft Windows
- Canadian dollar, currency of Canada
- Confederate States dollar, historical currency of the Confederate States of America
- Nicaraguan córdoba, currency of Nicaragua

== See also ==
- $ (disambiguation)
