= $1 =

$1 primarily refers to banknotes, bills or coins, including:

== Currency ==
- Australian one dollar coin, which replaced the one dollar note
- Loonie, which replaced the one dollar bill in Canada
- United States one-dollar bill, a denomination of US currency
- Dollar coin (United States), a metal coin
- New Zealand one-dollar coin, which replaced the one dollar note
- Dollar (Hong Kong coin), coin of the Hong Kong dollar
- The one-dollar banknotes of Zimbabwe

Other currencies with $1 banknotes, bills or coins are:

Dollars

- Bahamian dollar
- Barbadian dollar
- Belize dollar
- Bermudian dollar
- Brunei dollar
- Cayman Islands dollar
- Cook Islands dollar
- East Caribbean dollar
- Fijian dollar
- Guyanese dollar
- Jamaican dollar
- Liberian dollar
- Namibian dollar
- Samoan tālā
- Singapore dollar
- Solomon Islands dollar
- Surinamese dollar
- New Taiwan dollar
- Trinidad and Tobago dollar
- Tuvaluan dollar

Pesos

- Argentine peso
- Chilean peso
- Cuban peso
- Dominican peso
- Mexican peso
- Uruguayan peso

Other currencies

- Brazilian real
- Cape Verdean escudo
- Nicaraguan córdoba
- Tongan paʻanga

== Other uses ==
- $1, a formal parameter in some programming languages
- One Dollar (TV series), American mystery thriller drama series that premiered in 2018

== See also ==
- Dollar sign $, a symbol primarily used to indicate the various peso and dollar units of currency around the world
- Dollar, the name of several currencies
- Peso, the name of the monetary unit of Spain and several former Spanish colonies
