= Hong Kong one-dollar note =

One Dollars
(Hong Kong)
- Value: 1 Hong Kong dollars
- Width: 126 mm
- Height: 79 mm
- Security features: Watermark
- Material used: Cotton
- Years of printing: various years

Obverse
- Design: Queen Elizabeth II
- Design date: 1934?

Reverse
- Design: Stylised
- Design date: 1934?

The one dollar note was first issued by The Hongkong and Shanghai Banking Corporation from 1872 to 1935. No other bank issued this denomination. In 1935 the Government of Hong Kong took over the issuing and became the sole issuer for this denomination. There was a continuous issue till the Second World War when it was replaced by the Japanese Military Yen, and this issue was resumed after the war in 1946, until 1960, when it was replaced with a coin. The initial issue by the HSBC was brown on the obverse and red on the reverse. The note was stylised and was 189 by 123 mm. This was changed in 1889 to a new design and size, now it was 129 by 86 and the colours were blue on the obverse and red on the reverse. This lasted till 1904 when a new issue was released, being 132 by 90 mm and green on the obverse and orange the reverse. The colour and size of this issue was changed in 1923 to 131 by 93 mm and was green on both sides. The last issue by the HSBC was in 1926 when a new design 131 by 95 was issued in blue obverse and purple reverse, both sides with a yellow background.

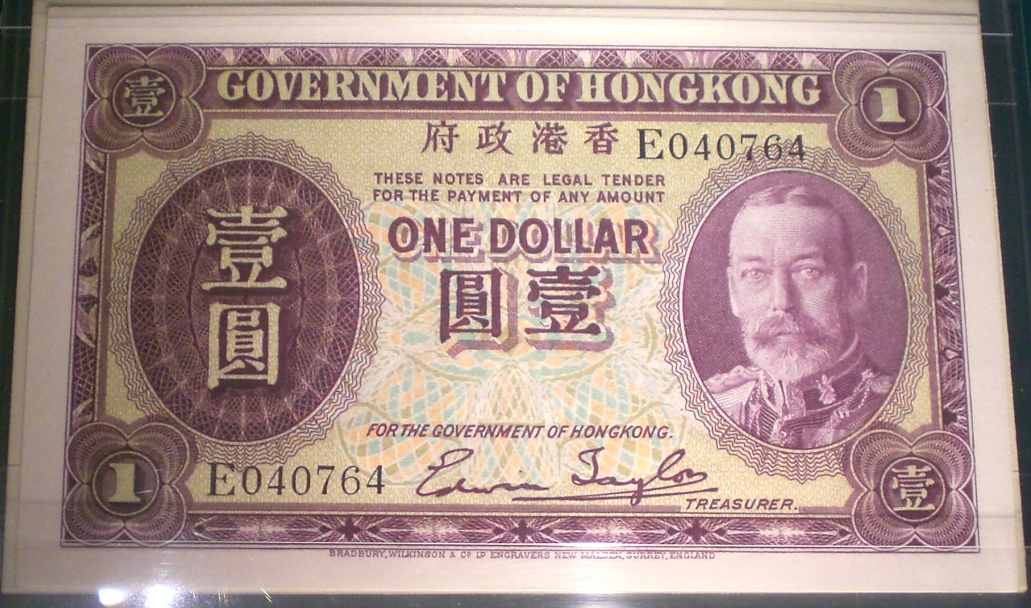
1935 issue.

After the take over of issuance by the government, a portrait of the then British monarch was included on the obverse, these were issued in purple till 1942, then upon reissue in 1945 they became light blue. In 1949 they were changed to green, the issue changed only in portrait and colour, all other features stayed the same.

Preceded by none	Hong Kong one-dollar note 1872-1960	Succeeded by Hong Kong one-dollar coin
