= The King Khan & BBQ Show LP =

Studio album by The King Khan & BBQ Show
- Released: September 29, 2004
- Genres: Garage rock, doo wop
- Label: Goner Records

The King Khan & BBQ Show chronology
The King Khan & BBQ Show LP (2004)	What's for Dinner? (2006)

Professional ratings
Review scores
Source	Rating
KLYAM	A

The King Khan & BBQ Show LP is the first studio album by Canadian garage rock band The King Khan & BBQ Show. The album was recorded from 2002 to 2004 and released on September 29, 2004.

The album was re-issued twice, the first time in 2005 by Hazelwood Records and the second in 2007 by In the Red Records.

The track "Love You So" became a viral success on the social media app TikTok, with videos containing the song amassing a total of 38 billion views in the first half of 2022.

== Track listing ==
All lyrics are written by King Khan and Mark Sultan.

Side one
No.	Title	Lead vocals	Length
1.	"Waddlin' Around"	Sultan	3:23
2.	"Fish Fight"	Sultan	2:50
3.	"Get Down"	Khan	2:02
4.	"Hold Me Tight"	Khan	2:36
5.	"Love You So"	Sultan	3:45
6.	"Got It Made"	Sultan	3:03

Side two
No.	Title	Lead vocals	Length
1.	"Pig Pig"	Khan	2:23
2.	"Shake Real Low"	Sultan	4:27
3.	"Bimbo's Theme"	Sultan	4:13
4.	"Lil' Girl in the Woods"	Sultan	2:13
5.	"Outta My Mind"	Sultan	3:17
6.	"Mind Body, & Soul"	Khan	5:42
