= $ (disambiguation) =

$ is the symbol used in most currencies named dollar or peso.

$ may refer to:

== Currencies ==
=== Currencies named dollar using the $ sign ===
- Australian dollar
- Bahamian dollar
- Barbadian dollar
- Belize dollar
- Bermudian dollar
- Brunei dollar
- Canadian dollar
- Cayman Islands dollar
- Eastern Caribbean dollar
- Fijian dollar
- Guyanese dollar
- Hong Kong dollar
- Jamaican dollar
- Kiribati dollar
- Liberian dollar
- Namibian dollar
- New Zealand dollar
- Singapore dollar
- Solomon Islands dollar
- Surinamese dollar
- New Taiwan dollar
- Trinidad and Tobago dollar
- Tuvaluan dollar
- United States dollar

=== Currencies named peso using the $ sign ===
- Argentine peso
- Chilean peso
- Colombian peso
- Cuban peso
- Dominican peso
- Mexican peso
- Uruguayan peso

=== Other currencies using the $ sign ===
- Brazilian real
- Nicaraguan córdoba
- Samoan tālā
- South Vietnamese đồng (ceased to circulate in 1978)
- Tongan paʻanga

=== Currencies that use the cifrão which closely resembles $ ===
- Cifrão, a similar symbol, $\mathrm{S}\!\!\!\Vert$
- Cape Verdean escudo
- Portuguese escudo, prior to the introduction of the Euro

== Computing ==
- $, a sigil in computer programming
- $, the standard alias for invoking JQuery (a JavaScript library)

== Music ==
- $ (Mark Sultan album), 2010
- "$" (Prince song), on 2009 album Lotusflow3r
- "$" (Ty Dolla Sign song), on 2016 mixtape Campaign
- Dollars (soundtrack), to the 1971 movie
- "$$$", a song from the 2018 album ?, by XXXTentacion
- "$$$", a song from the 2018 EP I Am, by (G)I-dle
- "$$$", a song from the 2024 album One of Wun, by Gunna
- Ty Dolla Sign, an American singer also known as Ty$

== Film and television ==
- $ (film), 1971 film also known as Dollars

== See also ==
- Dollar (disambiguation)
- Ֆ, a letter in the Armenian alphabet that resembles the $ symbol
