= Invisible Girl (album) =

Studio album by the King Khan & BBQ Show
- Released: November 3, 2009
- Genres: Garage rock, doo wop, comedy
- Label: In the Red

The King Khan & BBQ Show chronology
What's for Dinner (2007)	Invisible Girl (2009)	Bad News Boys (2015)

Professional ratings
Review scores
Source	Rating
KLYAM	9.7/10
Paste	7.5/10
Pitchfork Media	7.1
The Skinny	3/5 stars
Spin	4/5 stars
The Harvard Crimson	4/5 stars

Invisible Girl is the third studio album by garage rock band the King Khan & BBQ Show. The album was recorded in 2008 and was released on November 3, 2009.

== Track listing ==
All lyrics are written by King Khan and Mark Sultan.

Side one
No.	Title	Lead vocals	Length
1.	"Anala"	Sultan	2:55
2.	"Invisible Girl"	Khan, Sultan	4:00
3.	"Tastebuds"	Sultan, Khan	3:21
4.	"Animal Party"	Khan, Sultan	3:37
5.	"Spin the Bottle"	Khan, Sultan	3:17
6.	"Third Avenue"	Sultan	4:43

Side two
No.	Title	Lead vocals	Length
1.	"I'll Be Loving You"	Sultan	3:10
2.	"Truth Or Dare"	Khan	2:38
3.	"Crystal Ball"	Sultan, Khan	4:07
4.	"Lonely Boy"	Khan	2:29
5.	"Tryin'"	Sultan, Khan	3:49
6.	"Do The Chop"	Khan, Sultan	4:15
