= Magnus Reed =

British fashion and art photographer (born 1965)

Magnus Reed (born 1965) is a British fashion and art photographer. He lives and works in Berlin, Germany, with his daughter Alba.

== Life and work ==
Born in Sweden from a Swedish mother and a British father, Reed started his career working three years as an assistant to photographer Mikael Jansson. In the early 1990s he opened his own studio where his clients included H&M, Swedish Social Democratic Party, Benetton Group, Hackett London, and Henry Cotton's. He developed campaigns featuring Anna Nicole Smith, marking her first appearance as a fashion model, and Pamela Anderson, also at the early stage of her career. Bingo Rimér began his career working at the studio for two years.

In 1992 Reed also brought back to the fashion world the model Ingmari Lamy, marking her return from an 11 years hiatus and the start of her second career in fashion.

He later moved to Berlin, where he established a new creative hub and photo studio called The Apartment.

By the end of the 1990s Reed established a second residency in Cuba, where he made a photographic documentation of Havana. During the course of a year and a half, Reed explored the streets of Havana and their inhabitants with an 8x10 camera. The photographs are in black and white and show the ordinary life of the city, as well as more private moments. The project was presented for the first time in Havana with the name Fin de Siglo and later as an exhibition at the Kulturhuset in Stockholm.

In 2012 with the publication Berliner, The Asphalt Portraits, Reed presented a gallery of characters from the creative Berlin scene with a series of black and white portraits.

Since 2015 Reed is a member of the Jury Board at the Independent Film Festival Boddinale.

== Publications ==
=== Publications by Reed ===
- Berliner, The Asphalt Portraits.

=== Publications with contributions by Reed ===
- Contemporary Fashion. St. James, 1995. ISBN 978-1-55862-173-2.
- Designers' Houses. Harry N. Abrams, 2001. ISBN 978-0-86565-247-7.
- Excursion for Miracles: Paul Sanasardo, Donya Feuer, and Studio for Dance (1955–1964). Wesleyan University Press, 2005. ISBN 978-0-8195-6744-4.
- Schweppes Photographic Portrait Prize. London: National Portrait Gallery, 2005.
- American Hipster: A Life of Herbert Huncke: the Times Square Hustler who Inspired the Beat Movement. Magnus, 2013. ISBN 978-1-936833-21-4. Included Reed's photographic reportage on the life of Herbert Huncke.
