= Dollar (surname) =

Dollar is a surname. Notable people with the surname include:

- Aubrey Dollar (born 1980), American actress
- Bill Dollar (1950–1996), American radio host
- Cameron Dollar (born 1975), American basketball player and coach
- Caroline Dollar (born 1983), American actress
- Charles M. Dollar, expert on the management of electronic records
- Creflo Dollar (born 1962), American televangelist
- Jonny Dollar (1922–1986), American country and rockabilly singer, songwriter and guitarist
- Jonny Dollar (1964–2009), English record producer and songwriter
- Matt Dollar (born 1977), American politician
- Mladen Dolar (born 1951), Slovene philosopher
- Nelson Dollar (born 1961), American politician
- Robert Dollar (1844–1932), Scottish-born lumber baron, shipping magnate and philanthropist
- Sarway Dollar (born 1988), Sierra Leonean footballer
- William Dollar (1907–1986), American ballet dancer
- Beau Dollar, stage name of soul vocalist and drummer William Hargis Bowman Jr. (1941–2011)
