= Idle No More (album) =

Studio album by King Khan and the Shrines
- Released: September 3, 2013
- Genre: Rock
- Length: 40:12
- Label: Merge

King Khan and the Shrines chronology
The Supreme Genius of King Khan and the Shrines (2008)	Idle No More (2013)

Professional ratings
Aggregate scores
Source	Rating
Metacritic	75/100
Review scores
Source	Rating
Allmusic	4/5 stars
The A.V. Club	B+
Consequence of Sound	3.5/5 stars

Idle No More is the eighth studio album by Canadian band King Khan and the Shrines. It was released in September 2013 under Merge Records.

== Track listing ==
No.	Title	Length
1.	"Born to Die"	3:13
2.	"Bite My Tongue"	3:04
3.	"Thorn In Her Pride"	3:02
4.	"Luckiest Man"	3:46
5.	"Darkness"	4:06
6.	"Better Luck Next Time"	3:05
7.	"Pray for Lil"	3:46
8.	"Bad Boy"	3:15
9.	"So Wild"	3:52
10.	"Yes I Can't"	2:25
11.	"I Got Made"	2:58
12.	"Of Madness I Dream"	3:40
