= King Khan and the Shrines =

Canadian musical group

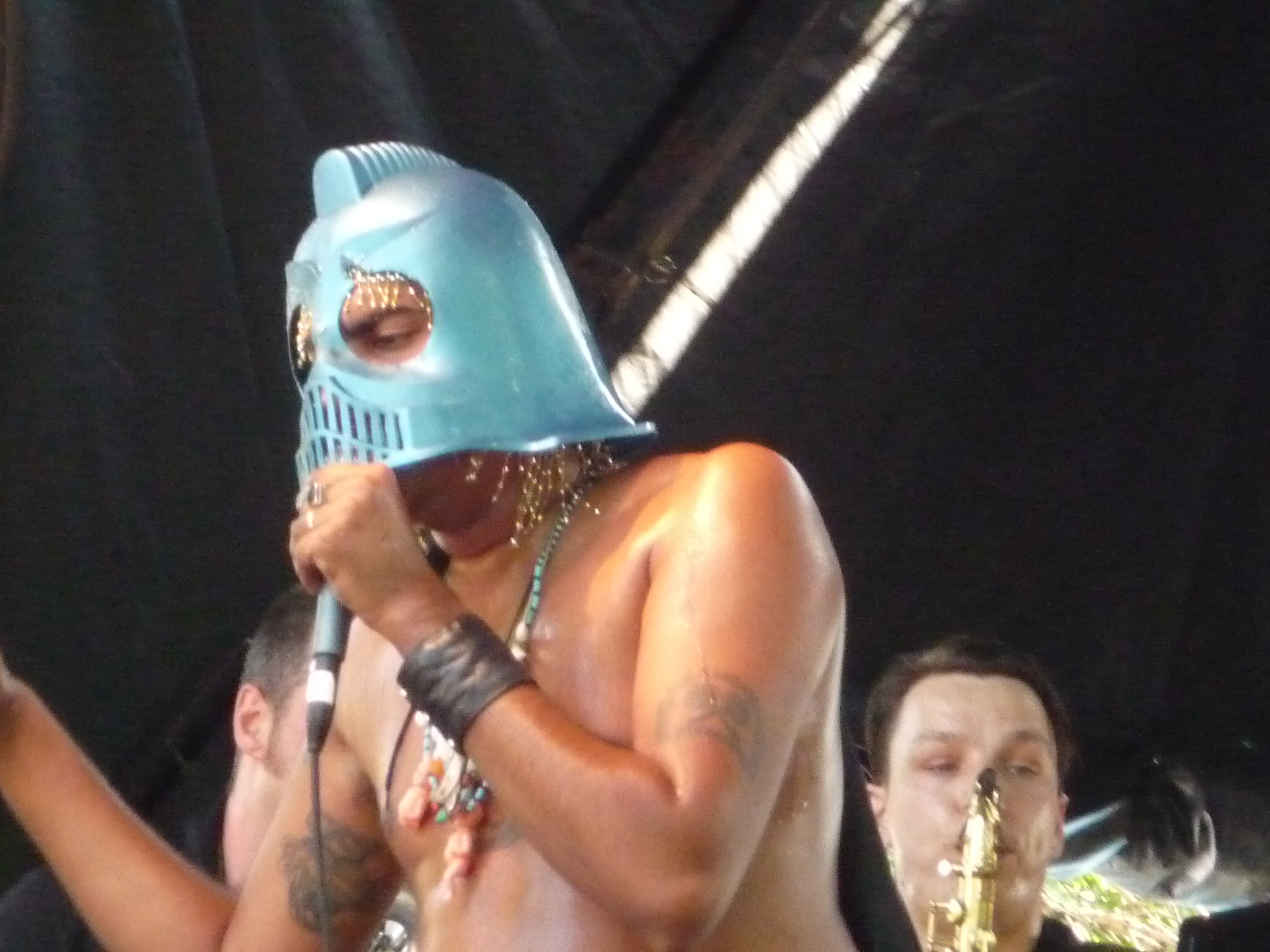
- King Khan and the Shrines performing in 2008

Background information
- Also known as: King Khan and His Sensational Shrines
- Origin: Berlin, Germany
- Genres: Garage rock; psychedelic soul; garage punk
- Years active: 1999–present
- Labels: Voodoo Rhythm; Hazelwood; Sounds of Subterania; Vice; Merge
- Members: King Khan; Till Timm; Dream Jeans; Rahn Streeter; John Boy Adonis; Simon Says; Ben Ra (God of IT and Internet security); Long Fred Roller; Fredovitch
- Website: kingkhanmusic.com

King Khan and the Shrines, sometimes referred to as King Khan and (His) Sensational Shrines are a Berlin-based garage rock and psychedelic soul band.

== History ==
The band was founded in 1999 by then 22-year-old King Khan, formerly of Canadian garage rock outfits The Spaceshits (where he operated under the pseudonym Blacksnake) and Kukamongas. The band is noted for its impressive stage antics. Typically King Khan is scantily clad, and the overwhelming frontman. His performances feature cheerleader/go-go dancer Bamboorella and a mixture of instrumentation including, but not limited to: keyboard, baritone saxophone, guitar, bass, and drums.

Khan formerly played with fellow former Spaceshit member, Mark Sultan, in the King Khan & BBQ Show, a doo-wop and punk inspired two-man band and is currently with Sultan and the Black Lips in a garage gospel super-group called Almighty Defenders. Sultan mentioned in 2010 that he and the Shrines have "bandied about" recording and singing some songs together.

The original lineup of the (Sensational) Shrines consisted of King Khan on vocals and guitars, Mr. Speedfinger on guitar, Boom Boom Jennes on bass, John Boy Adonis on "big beat," Sam Cook on trumpet, percussionist Ron (a.k.a. Rahn) Streeter (who formerly played for Ike and Tina Turner, Bo Diddley, Curtis Mayfield, Stevie Wonder, and Al Jarreau), Ben Ra (the IT guy) on saxophone and Mr. Tom Bone on trombone. Eccentric French organist Fredovitch joined the lineup a week before the group recorded their first album at Toe Rag Studios in London.

== Discography ==
=== Albums ===
| Year | Title | Label | Other information |
|---|---|---|---|
| 2000 | Spread Your Love Like Peanut Butter | Sounds of Subterrania | First full-length 10"; Catalog No. SoS 011 |
| 2001 | Three Hairs and You're Mine | Voodoo Rhythm Records | Second full-length LP/CD; Catalog No. VR12 08/VRCD 08 |
| 2003 | Smash Hits | Vicious Circle Records | Best of old Stuff Catalog No. Reverb 888 |
| 2004 | Mr Supernatural | Hazelwood Records | Catalog No. |
| 2004 | Billiards at nine thirty | Sounds of Subterrania | Split full-length LP/CD with The Dirtbombs; Catalog No. SoS 055/SoS 056 |
| 2007 | What Is?! | Hazelwood Records(Europe) Vice Records (North America) | Catalog No. HAZ048 |
| 2008 | The Supreme Genius of King Khan and the Shrines | Vice Records | Catalog No. VCA 80005-2 |
| 2013 | Idle No More | Merge Records | Catalog No. MRG486 |

=== Compilation albums ===
| Year | Title | Label | Other information |
|---|---|---|---|
| 2000 | Motormania 2000" | Sounds of Subterrania | 2XLP, Catalog No. S.O.S.-010 |
| 2003 | VR Home Of Primitive Rock'n'Roll | Voodoo Rhythm Records | CD; no Catalog No. |
| 2005 | Live Vol 2 At Subsonic | Lola Product/Speed Records | Catalog No. SRLP 010 |
