= Dollar (motorcycle) =

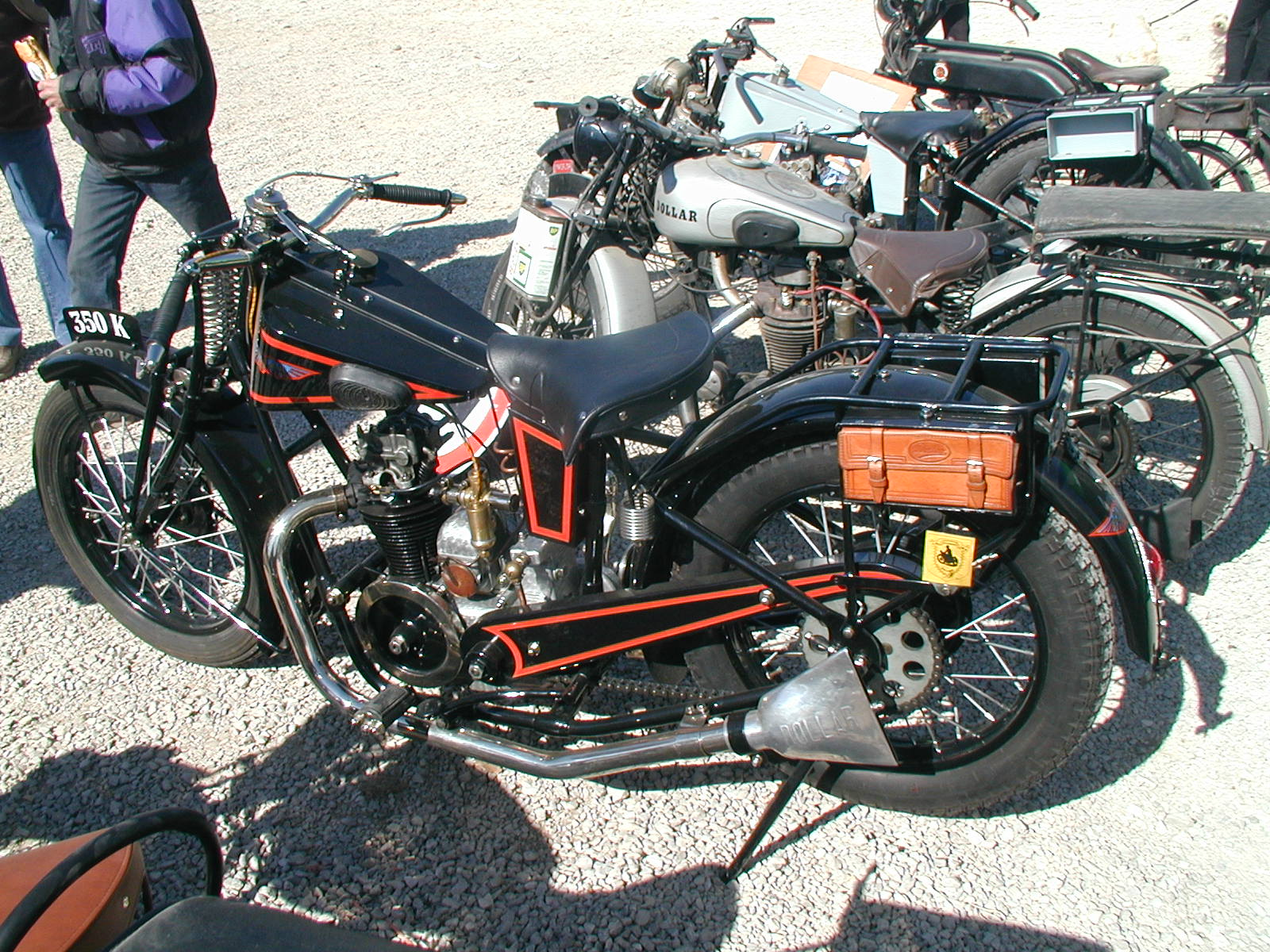
Dollar

Dollar was a French motorcycle made by Ets. Delachanel in Joinville-le-Pont from 1925 to 1939.

The motorcycles were made in several models ranging from 98 cc two stroke to 750 cc overhead valve four cylinder engines. There were also one and two cylinder models, with a sheet metal frame and Cardan shaft final drive. Dollar made its own engines, but also used Chaise overhead valve engines.
