= Dollar Lake =

There are at least 76 features in the US named Dollar Lake, according to GNIS:

name	type	elevation	coordinate	USGS Map	GNIS ID
Dollar Lake (San Bernardino County, California)	Lake	9,288 feet (2,831 m)	34°07′19″N 116°51′11″W	San Gorgonio Mountain	241537
Big Bird Lake (Tulare County, California)	Lake	9,770 feet (2,980 m)	36°37′15″N 118°35′36″W	Triple Divide Peak	254615
Dollar Lake (Fresno County, California)	Lake	10,223 feet (3,116 m)	36°49′59″N 118°24′26″W	Mount Clarence King	1667329
Dollar Lake (Gunnison County, Colorado)	Lake	10,036 feet (3,059 m)	38°51′27″N 107°12′07″W	Anthracite Range	186660
Dollar Lake (La Plata County, Colorado)	Lake	11,876 feet (3,620 m)	37°33′20″N 107°40′23″W	Mountain View Crest	187975
Dollar Lake (Hinsdale County, Colorado)	Lake	11,581 feet (3,530 m)	37°33′08″N 107°27′43″W	Emerald Lake	188040
Dollar Lake (Alamosa County, Colorado)	Lake	7,539 feet (2,298 m)	37°43′23″N 105°43′30″W	Medano Ranch	192616
Dollar Lake (Polk County, Florida)	Lake	135 feet (41 m)	27°58′05″N 081°40′24″W	Eloise	281664
Dollar Lake (Lumpkin County, Georgia)	Reservoir	1,657 feet (505 m)	34°40′36″N 083°54′30″W	Neels Gap	339640
Dollar Lake (Blaine County, Idaho)	Lake	5,955 feet (1,815 m)	43°41′18″N 114°25′06″W	Griffin Butte	380702
Dollar Lake (Grant County, Indiana)	Lake	909 feet (277 m)	40°27′30″N 085°27′45″W	Hartford City West	433616
Dollar Lake (LaGrange County, Indiana)	Lake	909 feet (277 m)	41°32′11″N 085°24′08″W	Oliver Lake	433617
Dollar Lake (LaPorte County, Indiana)	Lake	689 feet (210 m)	41°34′03″N 086°27′39″W	North Liberty	433618
Dollar Lake (Whitley County, Indiana)	Reservoir	889 feet (271 m)	41°17′04″N 085°32′53″W	Ormas	433619
Dollar Lake (Noble County, Indiana)	Lake	892 feet (272 m)	41°21′50″N 085°29′05″W	Merriam	450530
Dollar Lake (Jackson County, Michigan)	Lake	938 feet (286 m)	42°11′45″N 084°16′57″W	Michigan Center	624751
Dollar Lake (Livingston County, Michigan)	Lake	866 feet (264 m)	42°27′26″N 083°42′47″W	South Lyon	624752
Dollar Lake (Pontiac South, Oakland County, Michigan)	Lake	928 feet (283 m)	42°36′24″N 083°20′45″W	Pontiac South	624753
Dollar Lake (Clarkston, Oakland County, Michigan)	Lake	968 feet (295 m)	42°43′26″N 083°25′21″W	Clarkston	624754
Dollar Lake (Macomb County, Michigan)	Lake	837 feet (255 m)	42°47′08″N 083°04′27″W	Romeo	624755
Dollar Lake (Genesee County, Michigan)	Lake	869 feet (265 m)	42°50′53″N 083°42′25″W	Fenton	624756
Dollar Lake (Lapeer County, Michigan)	Lake	771 feet (235 m)	43°16′34″N 083°17′28″W	Mayville	624757
Dollar Lake (Woods, Clare County, Michigan)	Lake	1,112 feet (339 m)	43°51′23″N 084°57′02″W	Woods	624758
Dollar Lake (Lake George, Clare County, Michigan)	Lake	1,093 feet (333 m)	43°54′18″N 084°57′44″W	Lake George	624759
Dollar Lake (Osceola County, Michigan)	Lake	1,276 feet (389 m)	44°00′57″N 085°18′06″W	Dighton	624760
Dollar Lake (Gladwin County, Michigan)	Lake	827 feet (252 m)	44°08′34″N 084°21′10″W	Edwards	624761
Dollar Lake (Grand Traverse County, Michigan)	Lake	876 feet (267 m)	44°41′26″N 085°25′04″W	Jacks Landing	624762
Dollar Lake (Hillman, Montmorency County, Michigan)	Lake	827 feet (252 m)	45°06′52″N 083°57′39″W	Hillman	624763
Dollar Lake (Silver Lake, Montmorency County, Michigan)	Lake	823 feet (251 m)	45°11′34″N 084°19′03″W	Silver Lake	624764
Dollar Lake (Luce County, Michigan)	Lake	810 feet (250 m)	46°12′49″N 085°26′28″W	Gilchrist	624765
Dollar Lake (Little Lake, Marquette County, Michigan)	Lake	1,115 feet (340 m)	46°16′20″N 087°21′13″W	Little Lake	624766
Dollar Lake (Witch Lake, Marquette County, Michigan)	Lake	1,539 feet (469 m)	46°18′14″N 088°06′05″W	Witch Lake	624767
Dollar Lake (Buckroe, Marquette County, Michigan)	Lake	883 feet (269 m)	46°37′58″N 087°32′32″W	Buckroe	1618236
Dollar Lake (Newaygo County, Michigan)	Lake	837 feet (255 m)	43°43′24″N 085°55′05″W	Walkup Lake	1619730
Dollar Lake (Mason County, Michigan)	Lake	696 feet (212 m)	43°56′42″N 086°05′23″W	Tallman	1619731
Dollar Lake (Ogemaw County, Michigan)	Lake	886 feet (270 m)	44°26′15″N 083°53′43″W	South Branch	1619732
Dollar Lake (McKinley, Oscoda County, Michigan)	Lake	1,004 feet (306 m)	44°44′17″N 083°59′57″W	McKinley	1619733
Dollar Lake (McCollum Lake, Oscoda County, Michigan)	Lake	994 feet (303 m)	44°48′34″N 083°59′54″W	McCollum Lake	1619734
Jewett Lake (Ogemaw County, Michigan)	Lake	873 feet (266 m)	44°23′42″N 084°01′47″W	Rose City	1620364
Dollar Lake (Aitkin County, Minnesota)	Lake	1,234 feet (376 m)	46°41′40″N 093°16′24″W	Minnewawa	642876
Dollar Lake (Itasca County, Minnesota)	Lake	1,355 feet (413 m)	47°29′14″N 093°14′47″W	Nashwauk	642877
Dollar Lake (Pine County, Minnesota)	Lake	1,063 feet (324 m)	46°07′25″N 092°31′31″W	Wilbur Lake	642878
Bollar Lake (Cook County, Minnesota)	Lake	1,844 feet (562 m)	47°49′22″N 090°57′22″W	Beth Lake	655472
Dollar Lake (Beltrami County, Minnesota)	Lake	1,362 feet (415 m)	47°37′39″N 094°28′42″W	Decker Lake	656025
Dollar Lake (Cass County, Minnesota)	Lake	1,335 feet (407 m)	47°02′59″N 094°00′21″W	Tobique	659434
Dollar Lake (Makinen, St. Louis County, Minnesota)	Lake	1,365 feet (416 m)	47°16′46″N 092°20′42″W	Makinen	661127
Dollar Lake (Dewey Lake, St. Louis County, Minnesota)	Lake	1,417 feet (432 m)	47°34′00″N 092°57′14″W	Dewey Lake	661128
Dollar Lake (Isanti County, Minnesota)	Lake	945 feet (288 m)	45°35′47″N 093°10′11″W	Cambridge	1814974
Dollar Lake (Leflore County, Mississippi)	Lake	102 feet (31 m)	33°17′52″N 090°23′28″W	Swiftown	669324
Dollar Lake (Holmes County, Mississippi)	Lake	108 feet (33 m)	33°14′20″N 090°12′24″W	Tchula	684293
Dollar Lake (Clarke County, Mississippi)	Reservoir	292 feet (89 m)	32°12′56″N 088°47′12″W	Stonewall	690790
Dollar Lake (Ravalli County, Montana)	Lake	7,237 feet (2,206 m)	45°51′53″N 114°22′38″W	Mount Jerusalem	782452
Dollar Lake (Flathead County, Montana)	Lake	3,448 feet (1,051 m)	48°26′49″N 114°24′51″W	Beaver Lake	782453
Dollar Lake (Beaverhead County, Montana)	Lake	9,183 feet (2,799 m)	45°23′53″N 113°00′00″W	Torrey Mountain	782454
Dollar Lake (Park County, Montana)	Lake	8,980 feet (2,740 m)	45°03′05″N 109°49′13″W	Fossil Lake	805967
Dollar Lake (Stutsman County, North Dakota)	Lake	1,562 feet (476 m)	47°13′55″N 098°59′45″W	Pingree	1028699
Dollar Lake (Summit County, Ohio)	Reservoir	968 feet (295 m)	41°00′40″N 081°32′14″W	Akron West	1039743
Dollar Lake (Wallowa County, Oregon)	Lake	8,474 feet (2,583 m)	45°11′24″N 117°11′16″W	Aneroid Mountain	1141157
Dollar Lake (Hood River County, Oregon)	Lake	5,978 feet (1,822 m)	45°24′40″N 121°42′11″W	Mount Hood North	1141158
Dollar Lake (Harney County, Oregon)	Lake	6,421 feet (1,957 m)	42°54′04″N 118°28′24″W	Comegys Lake	1160945
Dollar Lake (Crawford County, Pennsylvania)	Lake	1,014 feet (309 m)	41°33′26″N 080°22′07″W	Conneaut Lake	1173355
Dollar Lake (Marshall County, South Dakota)	Lake	1,929 feet (588 m)	45°45′35″N 097°23′19″W	Hillhead	1254725
Dollar Lake (Uintah County, Utah)	Lake	10,505 feet (3,202 m)	40°46′25″N 109°57′21″W	Whiterocks Lake	1440514
Dollar Lake (Summit County, Utah)	Lake	10,791 feet (3,289 m)	40°49′38″N 110°22′34″W	Mount Powell	1440515
Devine Lake (Vilas County, Wisconsin)	Lake	1,601 feet (488 m)	45°58′51″N 089°44′22″W	Woodruff	1563950
Dollar Lake (Shawano County, Wisconsin)	Lake	1,322 feet (403 m)	45°01′44″N 089°03′12″W	Mattoon	1564041
Dollar Lake (Starks, Oneida County, Wisconsin)	Lake	1,627 feet (496 m)	45°43′18″N 089°14′41″W	Starks	1564042
Dollar Lake (Iron County, Wisconsin)	Lake	1,575 feet (480 m)	46°10′39″N 090°09′11″W	Lake of the Falls	1564043
Dollar Lake (Ashland County, Wisconsin)	Lake	1,542 feet (470 m)	46°16′37″N 090°36′19″W	Mount Whittlesey	1564044
Dollar Lake (Oconto County, Wisconsin)	Lake	1,312 feet (400 m)	45°15′46″N 088°38′58″W	Reservoir Pond	1579134
Dollar Lake (Eagle River, Vilas County, Wisconsin)	Lake	1,621 feet (494 m)	45°55′04″N 089°12′14″W	Eagle River East	1579135
Dollar Lake (Black Oak Lake, Vilas County, Wisconsin)	Lake	1,716 feet (523 m)	46°10′28″N 089°20′08″W	Black Oak Lake	1579136
Dollar Lake (Hazelhurst, Oneida County, Wisconsin)	Lake	1,575 feet (480 m)	45°48′20″N 089°43′56″W	Hazelhurst	1843840
Dollar Lake (Park County, Wyoming)	Lake	9,429 feet (2,874 m)	44°55′04″N 109°29′29″W	Deep Lake	1587697
Dollar Lake (Klondike Hill, Sublette County, Wyoming)	Lake	7,782 feet (2,372 m)	43°20′33″N 110°00′21″W	Klondike Hill	1599284
Dollar Lake (Union Peak, Sublette County, Wyoming)	Lake	9,905 feet (3,019 m)	43°25′39″N 109°48′25″W	Union Peak	1599285
