= Sarway Dollar =

Sierra Leonean footballer

Personal information
- Full name: Sarway Dollar
- Date of birth: 19 July 1988 (age 38)
- Place of birth: Freetown, Sierra Leone
- Height: 5 ft 9 in (1.75 m)
- Position: Right wing-back

Team information
- Current team: Mighty Blackpool

International career
Years	Team	Apps	(Gls)
- Sierra Leone

Sarway Dollar (born 19 July 1988 in Freetown, Sierra Leone) is a Sierra Leonean international footballer currently playing at right back for Mighty Blackpool in the Sierra Leone National Premier League, and for the Leone Stars squad, as Sierra Leone national football team.

== Profile ==
Sarway Dollar was born and raised in Freetown to Kissi parents. Sarway attended the Methodist Boys High School in Freetown. Dollar played in every game during the African U-17 Championship in Swaziland, where his country finished in second place behind Cameroon. He was again selected to the Sierra Leone under-17 squad that participated at the 2003 FIFA U-17 World Championship in Finland. He played every minute of every match during that tournament. Dollar captained Sierra Leone at the 2005 Meridian Cup in Turkey.

Playing career

- 04–05 Mighty Blackpool (Sierra Leone)
- 05–06 Mighty Blackpool (Sierra Leone)
- 06–07 Mighty Blackpool (Sierra Leone)
- 07–08 Mighty Blackpool (Sierra Leone)
