= Dollard (name) =

Dollard is a masculine given name, a Canadian surname with German and English origins, and an anglicization of the Irish surname Ó Dhollaird. People with the name Dollard include:

== Given name ==
- Dollard Ménard, a Canadian general
- Dollard St. Laurent, a retired Canadian ice hockey defenceman

== Surname ==
- Adam Dollard des Ormeaux, a colonist and soldier of New France
- Edmund Dollard, Syracuse University men's basketball coach
- John Dollard, American psychologist
- Pat Dollard, an American documentary filmmaker
- Robert Dollard, the first attorney general of South Dakota
- William Dollard, a Canadian Roman Catholic priest and Bishop of Saint John
