= Boddinale =

International film festival in Berlin

Logo of Boddinale

Boddinale is an international film festival for Berlin-based directors that takes place every year starting on the second Thursday of February.

The Festival is eleven days long, with the last day dedicated to an awards ceremony and re-screening of the winning films. Defined as a community festival, Boddinale has no admission fees and take place in three art bars with several screens presenting the program simultaneously in Boddinstrasse, a street in Neukolln, Berlin, Germany.

Since its first edition in 2013 Boddinale has been defined by local media as "the unofficial little sister of the Berlinale" or "the other Berlinale", in reference to the Berlin International Film Festival.

The Festival was established by the art director Gianluca Baccanico as part of the program of Loophole ArtSpace, a venue for independent artists where the Festival. Since 2019 Boddinale moved its location at the historic building of the Flutgraben e.V.

== Awards ==
Boddinale presents works from artists that are living in Berlin in five different categories: Feature, Documentary, Short, Animation, Music Video. All the directors are present for a question and answer session after their screening.

A permanent jury board selects a winner for each category that is announced on the last Sunday of the Festival, after the ceremony the awarded movies are screened for a second time to close the Festival. Since the first edition the Winners are hosted for a night in April at Moviemento, the oldest active cinema in Germany.

== Jury ==
The Jury of Boddinale is permanent and is composed of Nele Fritzsche, Michael Lederer, Sven Loose, Carla Molino, Lorenzo Musiu, Magnus Reed, Franziska Rummel

== Winners ==
=== 2013 ===
- Best Feature - Anna Pavlova Lives in Berlin by Theo Solnik
- Best Short - Vermin by Adi Gelbart
- Loophole Award - Poor, Dumb, Young and White by R. K. Fielden
- Special Mention of the Jury - So Glad I did by Helena Giuffrid

=== 2014 ===
- Best Feature - For a lot of euros more by Alberto Nikakis
- Best Short - Das Meer im Fernseher by Dimitri Tsvetkov
- Best Animation - DonPlusUltra, Im Bann des Doktor Fiese by Marcus Grysczok
- Special Mention of the Jury - Santoor by Deborah Philips
- Community Award - Hinterm Ostbahhof by Lenka Ritschny
- Loophole Award - Thanks God Is Friday by Jan Beddegenoodts

=== 2015 ===
- Best Feature - Jerusalem for Cowards by Dalia Castel and Orit Nahmias
- Best Short - Kathedralen by Konrad Kästner
- Community Award - Kaptn Oskar by Tom Lass
- Loophole Award - Pawnshop Santa by Mary Ocher
- Special Mention of the Jury - Tiger der Series by Murat Ünal
- Special Mention of the Loophole - Berlin Spricht Wände by Markus Muthig
- Independent Life Award to Barbara Rosenthal

=== 2016 ===
- Best Feature - Buschow by Rosa Friedrich
- Best Documentary - I spy with my little eye by Vivien Hartmann
- Best Short - Murmel by Niels Kurvin, Anton Hempel
- Best Animation - Lucky Strikes back by André Kirchner
- Loophole Award - Berlin way of love by Salama Marine, Matthieu Do
- Community Award - Jargo by Maria Solrun

=== 2017 ===
- Best Feature - "Zwei soldaten" by Paul Hoffmann
- Best Documentary - "Valentina" by Maximilian Feldmann
- Best Short - "The wind" by Johan Planefeldt
- Best Music/Animation - "Hainbach - Miasmatic" by Nani Gutierrez
- Best Music/Animation - "Gelbart - The big sleep" by Adi Gelbart
- Loophole Award - "Keiner findet sich Orangensaft" by Hannah Schopf
- Community Award - "Yalla Khartoum" by Andreas Lamoth & Frederic Leitzke

=== 2018 ===
- Best Feature - "Nur ein tag in Berlin" by Malte Wirtz
- Best Documentary - "Of huge and small" by Artem Funk
- Best Short - "Hostel" by Daniel Popat
- Best Music Video - "ANDHIM - Mond" by Niklas Coskan
- Best Animation - "Compartments" by Daniella Koffler and Uli Seis
- Urban Spree Award - "Dust" by Deepak Tolange
- Community Award - "Hollywoodturke" by Murat Ünal

=== 2019 ===
- Best Feature Tie - "Deckname Jenny" by Samira Fansa
- Best Feature Tie - "Reise nach Jerusalem" by Lucia Chiarla
- Best Documentary - "Anderswo" by Adrian Figueroa
- Best Short - "Sulla soglia" by Riccardo Festa
- Best Music Video - "Lila von Grau" by Julia Grauberger
- Flutgraben Award - "Le Viol du Router" by Juliette Chenais De Busscher
