= $ (Mark Sultan album) =

Studio album by Mark Sultan
- Released: April 13, 2010
- Genre: Rock and roll, garage rock, doo wop, garage punk, powerpop
- Length: 48:56
- Label: Last Gang

Mark Sultan chronology
Sultanic Verses (2007)	$ (2010)

Professional ratings
Review scores
Source	Rating
Pitchfork Media	(6.8/10)
Now Magazine	4/5 stars
Kids Like You & Me	(9.3/10)

$ is the second solo studio album by the Canadian garage rock/doo-wop musician Mark Sultan. The album was recorded in 2009 and released on April 13, 2010.

== Track listing ==
No.	Title	Length
1.	"Icicles"	6:30
2.	"Don't Look Back"	2:31
3.	"Ten of Hearts"	5:09
4.	"Status"	3:12
5.	"I Get Nothin From My Girl"	2:44
6.	"Go Berserk"	3:14
7.	"I Am The End"	4:29
8.	"Misery's Upon Us"	2:57
9.	"I'll Be Loving You"	3:13
10.	"Waiting For Me"	2:31
11.	"Just To Hold You"	3:07
12.	"Catastrophe"	2:46
13.	"Nobody But You"	6:33
