= The King Khan & BBQ Show =

Canadian garage rock duo

- Origin: Montreal, Quebec, Canada
- Genres: Garage rock; doo-wop; punk rock; soul
- Years active: 2002–2010; 2011–present
- Labels: Solid Sex Lovie Doll; Norton; Goner; Hazelwood; In the Red
- Members: Arish Khan (King Khan); Mark Sultan (BBQ)

The King Khan & BBQ Show is a Canadian garage rock duo from Montreal, that mixes doo-wop, punk and soul. The band is composed of former Spaceshits bandmates Mark Sultan and Blacksnake, alias King Khan. Mark Sultan, under the pseudonym BBQ, contributed vocals, guitar, tambourine, bass drum, and snare drum, while King Khan provides lead guitar and vocals. An entertainer named Leo Chips, formerly known as Age of Danger of the Deadly Snakes, (the SHOW in King Khan & BBQ Show) joined the group as a drummer and organist for some shows during the Invisible Girl U.S tour in 2009.

Although the duo originally broke up in 2010, in 2011 they announced they had started recording together again and discussed the possibility of several new albums. This was followed up with continued touring in 2012 and a return to normality for the band.

== History ==
Mark Sultan and King Khan had both collaborated as members of the Montreal-based band Spaceshits from 1995 until 1999. During a mid-1999 European tour, Blacksnake, Khan's stage name at the time, opted to remain in Germany. Spaceshits, choosing not to continue without Khan, disbanded. Later in 1999, Sultan started another Montreal-based band, Les Sexareenos, before venturing off on his own in 2002 as a one-man band under the pseudonym BBQ. It was as BBQ that Sultan re-established contact with Khan, playing alongside Khan's new band, King Khan and the Shrines. The two began writing songs together at Khan's apartment in Germany, playing them live at sporadic shows around Germany and Spain.

In 2004, the band recorded their first album as The King Khan & BBQ Show, releasing The King Khan & BBQ Show LP on Goner Records in the US in September 2004, and on Hazelwood Records in Europe the following year in 2005. The album was recorded by DM Bob in Hamburg, Germany. In support of the album, the band began a world tour, with stops in Europe, the US, and South America.

In 2006, the band released their second LP, What's for Dinner?, on In the Red Records. In 2008, Impose Magazine crowned King Khan the best performer of 2008.

On July 31, 2009, Pitchfork reported that The King Khan & BBQ Show would be releasing their third album, Invisible Girl, in November of the same year. They embarked on a forty-day US/Canada tour to coincide with the release. On November 12, while on tour in the United States, Khan, Sultan, Leo Chips and tour manager Kristin Klein were arrested in Kentucky on illegal drug possession charges. Klein was also booked for driving with an invalid license. She entered a guilty plea and appeared in court on April 2, 2010. The band missed three shows due to the holdup. The same year, the band brought their typically confrontational and wild show to China for a tour with local promoters Split Works.

In 2010, the duo was hand picked by Lou Reed and Laurie Anderson to play two shows at the Vivid Live festival they were curating. The shows were played at the Sydney Opera House in Sydney, Australia. The festival described the band's art: "This dynamic duo has relentlessly pursued an uncompromising vision of the subversive power of music that pays no heed to commercial imperatives. Standing outside the industry, two fingers raised in salute, they have nevertheless managed to forge an international career completely on their own, idiosyncratic terms". The band split soon after the Sydney show.

On June 2, 2011, Sultan announced that he and Khan had recorded with one another once again. The following year on July 13, 2012, The King Khan & BBQ Show reunited for the first time since the Sydney show, for a sold-out performance at Lee's Palace in Toronto, Canada. They have continued to perform and tour throughout the 2010s and into the 2020s.

The duo's track "Love You So" from their 2004 debut album The King Khan & BBQ Show LP is one of the most used songs on the social media app TikTok, often seen as a placeholder for music even when the song is not playing. In the first half of 2022, "Love You So" was the most heard song on TikTok, with approximately 38 billion views across all videos containing the song. In a September 2022 interview, Khan commented on this sudden resurgence of their music, "Many friends of ours told me that their young children are blasting our music from their rooms, so maybe in 20 years rock n’ roll will be cool again!". Though he also added, "It’s surprising to me that music journalists find merit in this, and consider THIS as success — and that the only way our band can get an interview in our hometown paper after 20 years of actual “indie” milestones is to talk about the same format that destroys music and our forced relationship with it".

In June 2023, the duo released a single, "Going Down" which had been recorded in March 2022 in Sultan's house.

== Discography ==
=== Albums ===
- The King Khan & BBQ Show (Goner Records, 2004)
- What's for Dinner? (In the Red Records, 2006)
- Invisible Girl (In The Red Records, 2009)
- Bad News Boys (In The Red Records, 2015)

=== EPs ===
- Teabag Party (Crypt Records, 2007)
- Daytrotter Session (Daytrotter, 2012)

=== Singles ===
- "Too Much in Love / Chuck-a-Muck" (Solid Sex Lovie Doll Records, 2005)
- "Animal Party / God of Raisins" (Fat Possum Records, 2008)
- "We Are the Ocean / Terrapin" (Sultan Records, 2011)
- "Going Down" (Khannibalism & Mark Sultan, 2023)

=== Splits ===
- Flight 505 / Stupid Girl (with The Flakes) (Norton Records, 2006)
- Merry Christmas from the Black Lips and the King Khan & BBQ Show (with Black Lips) (Norton Records, 2007)

=== Live albums ===
- Live at Izola (Solid Sex Lovie Doll Records, 2005)

=== DVDs ===
- Live!!! in Kansas City - Double Disc DVD (Twitch Productions/The Little Room Record Co., 2008)
