= Dollar coin =

A dollar coin is a coin valued at one dollar in a given currency.

Examples include:

- Australian one dollar coin
- Canadian one dollar coin, or Loonie
- Canadian silver dollar
- Hong Kong one-dollar coin
- New Zealand one dollar coin
- Dollar coin (United States)
- Spanish milled dollar

== See also ==
- Half dollar (United States coin)
