= The Supreme Genius of King Khan and the Shrines =

Studio album by King Khan and the Shrines
- Released: June 17, 2008
- Genres: Psychedelic soul; garage rock
- Language: English
- Label: Vice Records

King Khan and the Shrines chronology
What Is?! (2007)	The Supreme Genius of King Khan and the Shrines (2008)	What Is?! (2009)

Professional ratings
Review scores
Source	Rating
AllMusic	4/5 stars
Pitchfork Media	(7.5/10)

The Supreme Genius of King Khan and the Shrines is the seventh studio album by the nine-member psychedelic soul band King Khan and the Shrines. It was released on June 17, 2008, by Vice Records.

== Track listing ==
No.	Title	Length
1.	"Torture"	3:08
2.	"Took My Lady To Dinner"	3:20
3.	"Outta Harm's Way"	3:13
4.	"Land of the Freak"	3:33
5.	"Fool Like Me"	3:53
6.	"I Wanna Be A Girl"	2:34
7.	"Welfare Bread"	4:08
8.	"Sweet Tooth"	2:43
9.	"Shivers Down My Spine"	4:10
10.	"Burnin' Inside"	3:10
11.	"Destroyer"	4:22
12.	"Live Fast Die Strong"	2:56
13.	"Crackin' Up"	2:11
14.	"Tell Me"	2:15
15.	"Que Lindo Sueño"	3:45
16.	"No Regrets"	2:31
