= François Jonquet =

French writer, novelist, art critic and film critic (born 1961)

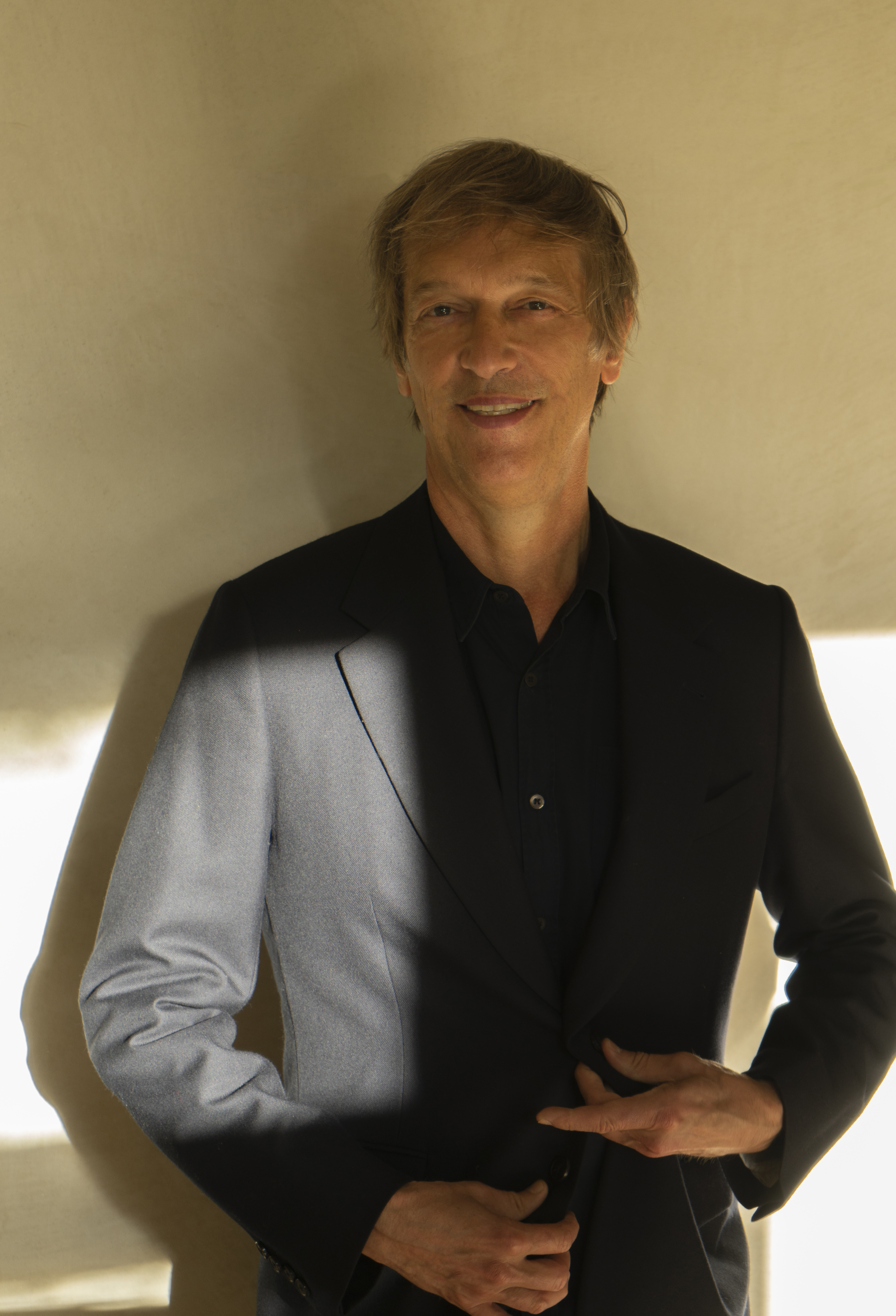
- Jonquet in Paris in 2021
- Born: 12 July 1961 (age 65); Châlons-en-Champagne, France
- Occupations: Writer, novelist, art critic and film critic

François Jonquet (born 12 July 1961), is a French Berlin-based writer and art critic. He is a member of the International Association of Art Critics (AICA). His specialty as a writer is to alternate novels and biographies.

As an art critic, François Jonquet collaborates with the magazine Artforum. Since 2005, he has contributed to the bilingual journal (French, English) art press founded by the art critic and writer Catherine Millet.

He is the author of the illustrated work of reference about the British art duo, Gilbert & George, Intimate Conversations with François Jonquet, Phaidon 2005. It comprises a distillation of interviews.

In 2000, he reconnected with an acquaintance from his youth. During his years nightclubbing, François Jonquet had hung out with Jenny Bel'Air, the star of the French underground of the seventies and eighties. A mixed-race transvestite, Jenny had been the physiognomist for Fabrice Emaer's legendary nightclub, Le Palace. A biography was published a year later, (Jenny Bel'Air, une créature, Éditions Pauvert, 2001).

Et me voici vivant (Sabine Wespieser Éditeur, 2006), is an account of his descent into madness.

He met with Daniel Emilfork in 2007. François Jonquet wrote an account of Emilfork's final years. Because of his facial features, Emilfork was often cast as antagonistic characters in films, including The City of Lost Children (Daniel, Sabine Wespieser Éditeur, 2008).

His coming-of-age novel, Les Vrais Paradis, (Sabine Wespieser Éditeur, 2014), is set in the Parisian nightclub, Le Palace, during the years 1979–84.

A personal portrait of Valérie Lang – the actress, political activist and daughter of Jack Lang, former Minister of Culture of President François Mitterrand – was published in 2018. (Je veux brûler tout mon temps, Seuil). She died suddenly at the age of forty-seven.

== Books ==
=== Novels ===
- Et me voici vivant, Sabine Wespieser, 2006 ISBN 9782848050447
- Les Vrais Paradis, Sabine Wespieser, 2014 ISBN 9782848051628
- De plomb et d’or, Sabine Wespieser, 2024 ISBN 9782848055077

=== Biographies ===
- Jenny Bel'Air, une créature, Éditions Pauvert, 2001 ISBN 9782720214257 (paperback: Éditions Points, 2021 ISBN 9782757887530)
- Daniel, Sabine Wespieser Éditeur, 2008 ISBN 2848050624
- Je veux brûler tout mon temps, Seuil, 2018 ISBN 9782021381375

=== Art books ===
- Hiquily, Cercle d'art, 1992 ISBN 2702203191
- Gilbert & George, intimate conversations with François Jonquet, Phaidon, 2005 ISBN 9780714844350

=== Publications in collective works (a selection) ===
- Claude Lévêque: Le Grand Soir, Venise 2009, Flammarion, 2009, bilingual (French/English) ISBN 9782081227811
- Les grands entretiens d'artpress. La Photographie 4. L'image construite, art press, 2016 ISBN 9782906705265
- Dancing with Myself, exhibition Catalogue Pinault Collection, Marsilio, 2018 ISBN 9788831729048
- Gilbert & George, Interview in November 2017 by François Jonquet, Pinault Collection Magazine, issue 10, 2018

== Portraits of artists and interviews online ==
- https://independent.academia.edu/Fran%C3%A7oisJonquet

== TV ==
- Les Années Palace , by François Jonquet, directed by Chantal Lasbats (2005, France 5, 1h20). The film can be viewed on Dailymotion (French version)
