= Mark Sultan =

Canadian musician

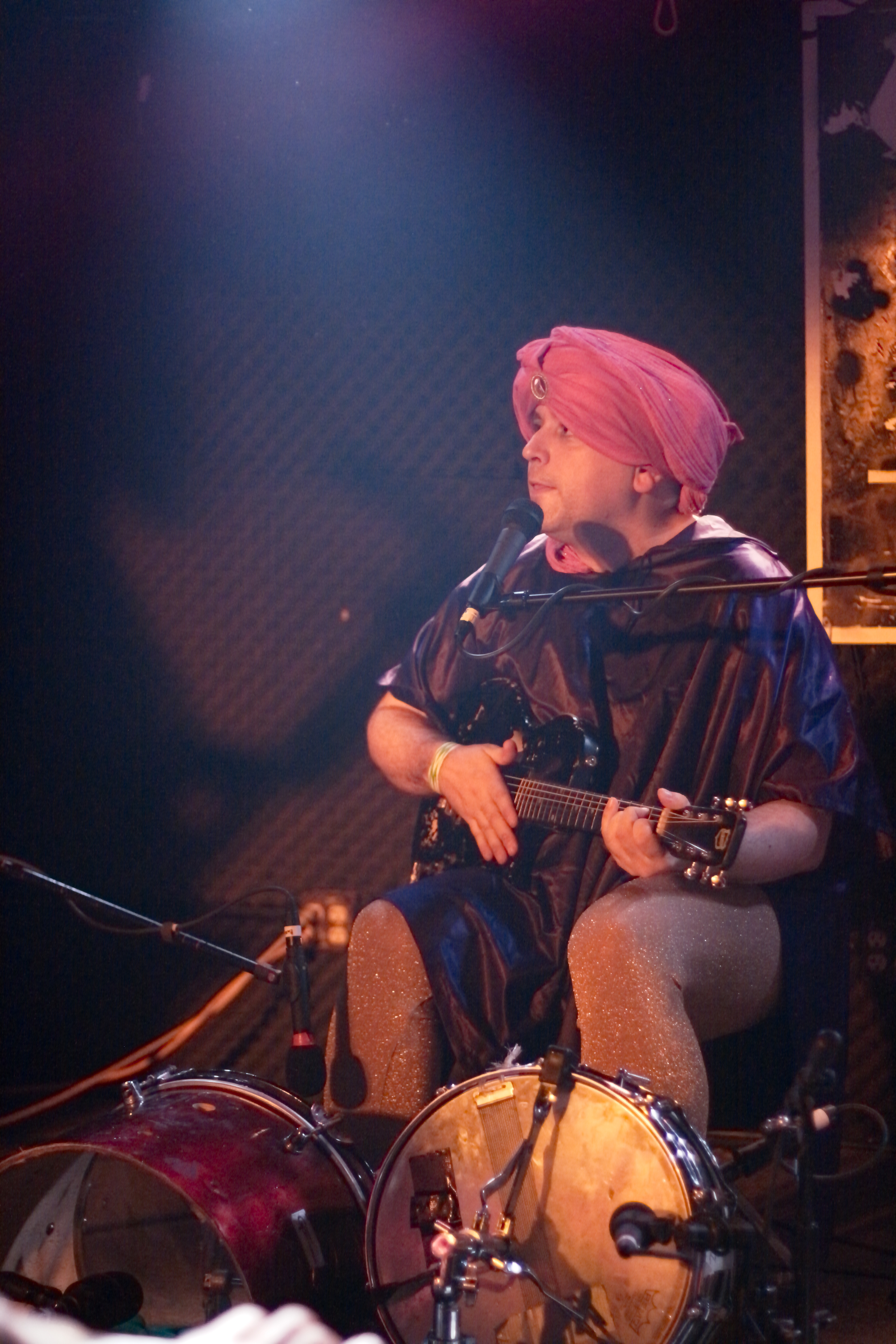
- Sultan, billed as BBQ performing in 2009

Background information
- Also known as: BBQ
- Born: Mark Antonio Pepe; November 14, 1973 (age 52); Montreal, Quebec, Canada
- Genres: Garage rock, garage punk, rock and roll
- Instruments: Vocals, guitar, drums, percussion
- Years active: 1989–present
- Labels: Sub Pop, Sultan Records, Sympathy For The Record Industry, Goner, Bomp!, In The Red Records
- Website: www.marksultan.com

Mark Sultan (born Mark Antonio Pepe) is a Canadian musician and entrepreneur from Montreal, Quebec. He was a member of a number of Canadian garage bands including the Spaceshits, Les Sexareenos, and Mind Controls. He has also spent time performing as a one-man band under the pseudonym BBQ, a moniker which has followed him beyond his solo career to his collaboration with former Spaceshits bandmate Blacksnake in the two-man band, The King Khan & BBQ Show. Mark Sultan usually performs using a number of aliases including Needles, Krebs, Von Needles, Skutch, Creepy, Bridge Mixture, Kib Husk, Noammnn Rummnyunn, Blortz, Celeb Prenup, and BBQ. In 2007 he released his first album as Mark Sultan entitled Sultanic Verses. In 2010, Sultan released $ as Mark Sultan and The Ding Dongs, the debut self-titled LP by Sultan and Bloodshot Bill.

== History ==
=== Childhood ===
Sultan was born in Montreal, Quebec. He was very interested in psychology as an adolescent, but in high school he grew anti-authoritarian and wasn't pleased with the fact he'd have to accept certain things in psychology. He got involved in playing punk at that time and ultimately stuck with music as what he wanted to do. At a very young age, he was able to recall lyrics with extreme precision and accuracy.

=== The Spaceshits ===
Sultan began his musical career playing drums in a band called Powersquat, a suburban group which combined a number of diverse influences into their notably violent live shows. After Powersquat, Sultan went on to join the Spaceshits, another Montreal-based band whose members approached Sultan in order to procure a lead singer. Sultan volunteered himself for the position and the band began writing songs together. At the time of Sultan's arrival the Spaceshits were composed of Oily Chi on rhythm guitar, Stinky B. on bass, and Skid Marks on drums, though within a few months Stinky B. was replaced on bass by Blacksnake, a Canadian of Indian descent. Tongues served as its lead guitarist until early 1998, when he left and was replaced by Alex Fascination, who left the band in 1999 after its European tour.

The Spaceshits, just like Powersquat before them, were well known for their violent stage shows. At first, sets lasted no longer than 10 to 15 minutes, during which the band or members of the audience would create disturbances, at times including fireworks or food fights. Eventually the band's raucous live shows would lead them to be effectively blacklisted from many venues in Montreal, a 9 April 1996 set in support of the New Bomb Turks in particular contributing to that. Another notable incident occurred on 30 April 1999, just before the beginning of a European tour, while the band was promoting a new Sultan Records release. As the first act, the Scat Rag Boosters, was performing, the venue's owners got into an altercation with the band's bassist Blacksnake, injuring his hand and leading to the destruction of a television. This incident caused the two remaining bands, Lyle Sheraton and the Daylight Lovers, as well as the Spaceshits, to refuse to play, and they encouraged the audience to seek refunds. This event marked the end of the band's booking in Montreal.

The Spaceshits went on to complete a European tour; one which would prove to be the last for the band. After the European tour had ended, Blacksnake opted to stay behind. Rather than continue on without him, the bandmembers broke up, believing both that the band had run its course, and that Blacksnake had been like a brother to them and so replacing him would have been impossible.

=== Les Sexareenos ===
In the summer of 1999, ex-Spaceshits Sultan and Marks joined ex-Daylight Lover Choyce to form Les Sexareenos. Joining them was Annie, whose Farfisa organ helped create a sound significantly different from that of the Spaceshits. Here, Sultan was a drummer and sang as well. Choyce and Marks served as guitarist and bassist and were the front stage presence and main vocalists. The name 'Les Sexareenos' comes from a pulp novel by Vin Saxon, pen name of Ron Haydock of The Boppers. As Les Sexareenos, Sultan released two LPs, Live! In Bed, and 14 Frenzied Shakers.

=== BBQ ===
In early 2002, Les Sexareenos had run its course. Sultan began recording on his own under the pseudonym BBQ, a one-man band in which Sultan sang, played guitar, and drummed simultaneously. As BBQ, Sultan performed with numerous bands including Bob Log III, The Deadly Snakes, The Woggles, The Ponys, Mr. Airplane Man, Nathaniel Mayer & The Shanks, The Cool Jerks, The Del-Gators, Scat Rag Boosters, The Mystery Girls, The Come-Ons, and The Soledad Brothers. Sultan's solo career lasted from 2002 to 2005, at which point he became dissatisfied with having to write songs on his own and reunited with former Spaceshits bandmate Blacksnake, who, since the breakup of the Spaceshits, had gone on to adopt King Khan as his stage name and was heading a band called King Khan and His Shrines.

In 2005, BBQ released an album on Bomp called Tie Your Noose; all tracks were recorded live during 2004. This album was one of the last projects coordinated by Bomp founder and rock historian Greg Shaw prior to his death in 2004.

=== The King Khan & BBQ Show ===
Starting in 2003, Sultan began recording with King Khan as The King Khan & BBQ Show. The King Khan & BBQ Show released their first self-titled album in 2005. This was followed by a U.S. tour, and eventually a world tour encompassing Europe, Australia, and South America. Their first album was followed in 2006 by a second LP called What's for Dinner? which was released on In the Red Records. Their third LP was released in November 2009 titled Invisible Girl, also on In the Red Records. The King Khan & BBQ Show disbanded in June 2010 but reunited to tour in 2014. Their fourth LP Bad News Boys was released in 2015.

=== Mark Sultan ===
In 2007, the first LP was released under the Mark Sultan name through In The Red Records titled The Sultanic Verses. In contrast to his BBQ act, Sultan was aiming for more of a full band sound and was assisted in producing the record by such people as the CPC Gangbangs' Choyce, The Demon Claws' Jeff Clarke and by Jay Reatard, who mastered it. In 2010, his second LP was released through Last Gang Records, titled $.

In September 2010 Sultan offered a track for the compilation album Daddy Rockin Strong: A Tribute to Nolan Strong & The Diablos - he recorded a cover of the '50s Detroit doo-wop classic "The Wind". The Wind Records, along with Norton Records, released the album.

=== Almighty Defenders ===
During the Black Lips' January 2009 tour of India, following an incident at a rowdy show during which Cole Alexander kissed fellow bandmember Ian St. Pe and exposed his private parts on-stage, the Lips fled the country while rumors of their arrests circulated the internet. The tour was canceled and the group members fled to the Berlin, Germany residence of King Khan, where Sultan so happened to be recording tracks with Khan for the King Khan and BBQ Show's upcoming "Invisible Girl". Over the course of eight days, in a typically booze-sloppy Black Lips fashion, they laid down 11 tracks with Khan and Sultan. On June 17, the full group made its live debut, performing a set in choir robes at the North by Northeast festival, and Vice Records released the Almighty Defenders' self-titled debut on September 22, 2009.

=== The Ding Dongs ===
In October 2009, Sultan completed an album with Bloodshot Bill. The band posted two songs from the LP, which will be released on Norton Records, in May 2010 under the moniker The Ding Dongs. The album was delayed from its original release of March 29, 2010.

== Sultan Records ==
Mark Sultan is also the founder and current owner of Sultan Records, an independent record label based in Montreal, Quebec. Sultan Records has issued releases from a number of garage rock bands, including Scat Rag Boosters, The Deadly Snakes, The Daylight Lovers, and Sultan's own band, the Spaceshits. It has long been inactive.
