= Banknotes of the New Zealand dollar =

ISO 4217
- Code: NZD (New Zealand dollar)

Denominations
- Currency symbol: $
- Subunit: c (Cent) (1/100)
Banknote denominations
- Current: $5, $10, $20, $50, $100
- Former: $1, $2

Issuance
- Central Bank: Reserve Bank of New Zealand
- Printer: Canadian Bank Note Company

New Zealand dollar banknotes are the banknotes in circulation in New Zealand, the Cook Islands, Tokelau, Niue and the Pitcairn Islands, denominated in the New Zealand dollar (symbol: $; ISO 4217 currency code NZD, also abbreviated NZ$). They are issued by the Reserve Bank of New Zealand and since 1999 have been made of polymer.

== History ==
Before 1934, a number of trading banks issued their own banknotes in New Zealand and were not obligated to accept each other's banknotes. By the 1920s there was a general desire to have a single, uniform national currency. Accordingly, the Reserve Bank was established in 1934 as the sole authority for issuing New Zealand's national banknotes, while the New Zealand Treasury had responsibility for issuing new coins. New Zealand was the last Dominion to establish a national currency.

The Reserve Bank has released seven different issues of New Zealand bank notes; two issues took place when the New Zealand pound was the national currency, and the remaining five issues have taken place since New Zealand switched to decimal currency in 1967.

=== First and second series: Pre-decimal ===
The first New Zealand banknotes were released on 1 August 1934, signed by the first Governor of the Reserve Bank, Leslie Lefeaux. The first issue was printed by Thomas de la Rue and his company based in London, and included notes with the denomination of 10/- (ten shillings), £1 (one pound), £5 and £50. The banknotes were all the same size: 7 by 3.5 inches (178 mm × 89 mm).

The first issue notes were designed at short notice and intended to be temporary for that reason. The features were based on notes already in circulation and included Māori iconography; each note featured a kiwi, the New Zealand coat of arms, Mitre Peak, and a portrait of King Tāwhiao, the second Māori king.

The second series notes were first issued on 6 February 1940, marking the centenary of the Treaty of Waitangi. The designs were largely developed by a Reserve Bank Committee led by Lefeaux with consultants including Sir James Shelley. The design and colours for the 10/- and £50 notes were changed, and a £10 note was introduced. A portrait of Captain James Cook replaced the portrait of King Tāwhiao and Māori iconography was less prominent than it had been in the second issue, although the King remained on the notes' watermark and a vignette of the signing of the Treaty was added to the 10/- note.

The British monarch did not feature on any of the first or second issue banknotes, because an appropriate engraving of George VI was not available in time.

=== Third series: 1967–1981 ===
The first New Zealand $20 note obverse side, series three (1967-1981)

Decimalisation of the New Zealand currency occurred on 10 July 1967, when the New Zealand pound was replaced by the New Zealand dollar. New decimal banknotes were introduced to replace the existing pound banknotes, in denominations of $1, $2, $5, $10, $20, and $100.

The designs were selected by a six-person design committee appointed in 1964, which included Alexander McLintock, Stewart Bell Maclennan and Professor John Simpson, Dean of the Faculty of Fine Arts at the University of Canterbury. All the notes of this series had Queen Elizabeth II on the front, and a watermark of Captain Cook. They also had a New Zealand bird and the plant most closely associated with that species on the back. The colour scheme on all but the five-dollar note (which was an entirely new denomination, worth £2 10s) remained the same on equivalent pound and dollar notes, to aid cash-handling during the transition (e.g. £10 and $20 were both green).

=== Fourth series: 1981–1991 ===
New Zealand $20 note obverse side, series four (1981-1992)

In late 1981 the Reserve Bank switched to a different printer, the New Zealand branch of Bradbury Wilkinson & Co, which meant that new printing plates had to be made. The only changes with this series were minor drawing changes and an update to the portrait of Elizabeth II. Elizabeth II now faced forward, rather than to the left. It was based upon a photograph by Peter Grugeon, with the Queen wearing Grand Duchess Vladimir's tiara and Queen Victoria's golden jubilee necklace. The fifty-dollar note was introduced in 1983 as part of this series to fill the gap between the twenty-dollar and one-hundred-dollar notes.

A commemorative ten-dollar note was issued in 1990 to commemorate 150 years since the signing of the Treaty of Waitangi.

The one-dollar and two-dollar notes were discontinued in 1991 and replaced by the one-dollar and two-dollar coins, both coloured gold. Requests for a donation (koha) at an event or other occasion are often framed as requests for a "gold coin donation".

=== Fifth series: 1992–1999 ===
New Zealand's banknotes were completely re-designed in 1991 to introduce uniquely New Zealand designs. The new series featured notable New Zealanders on the front, with the exception of the twenty-dollar note, which still featured Elizabeth II. The reverse sides were redesigned to incorporate a natural New Zealand scene, with a native New Zealand bird in the foreground. The Queen replaced Captain Cook as the image for the watermark. A notable feature of the new series was the inclusion of the portrait of Sir Edmund Hillary on the front of the five-dollar note. He was the only living person to appear on a New Zealand banknote during his lifetime (other than monarchs).

The banknote redesign was reportedly required because when the Reserve Bank governor Don Brash told the existing printer, Bradbury Wilkinson & Co, that the bank proposed to put the printing of banknotes (its largest cost) out to tender, the firm said that they owned the copyright on the plates. The decision was made to re-design the banknotes in order to avoid copyright issues. After the tender, Bradbury Wilkinson & Co retained printing rights, but the price per note was significantly less.

=== Sixth series: 1999–2014 ===
In 1999, New Zealand changed from paper banknotes to polymer banknotes. The change increased the life of the banknotes and also allowed new and improved security features to prevent counterfeiting. The overall design of the notes remained unchanged albeit for slight modifications for the new security features.

The Reserve Bank issued another special edition of the ten-dollar note in 1999 to celebrate the new millennium in New Zealand. Over three million of these notes were issued into general circulation, and the Reserve Bank began withdrawing them in 2002. They are now collector's items and as of 2020 can sell for as much as NZ$88.

=== Seventh series: 2015 onwards ===
The obverse of a Series 7 (2015) $10 note

In July 2011, the Reserve Bank of New Zealand announced that a new issue of banknotes would be released for circulation from 2015. The new five-dollar and ten-dollar notes were released in October 2015, and the new twenty-dollar, fifty-dollar and one-hundred-dollar notes were released in May 2016. The Reserve Bank termed the issue the "Brighter Money" series.

The new series was introduced in order to add more security features to New Zealand banknotes. As surveys showed that the New Zealand public were generally content with the note design, very few design changes were made, and the designs remained substantially the same as the Series 5 designs. The notes were brighter in colour and featured the Māori translation of Reserve Bank (Te Pūtea Matua), and "New Zealand, Aotearoa" on the back. The new notes filtered out slowly because they were only issued as returned older notes came in. Polymer banknotes last four times as long as cotton banknotes, and as of July 2018 many notes from the sixth series could still be found in circulation.

=== Future ===
After the death of Queen Elizabeth II in September 2022, the Reserve Bank said it would exhaust its existing stocks of twenty-dollar notes before introducing new twenty-dollar notes featuring King Charles III. Based on current stock levels, this would likely be several years away.

== Current banknotes ==
The most recent issue of New Zealand banknotes is the seventh series, first released in October 2015 and May 2016.

Image		Value	Dimensions	Main Colour	Description			Date of issue
Obverse	Reverse	Value	Dimensions	Main Colour	Obverse	Reverse	Window image	Date of issue
		$5	135 × 66 mm (5.3 × 2.6 in)	Orange	Sir Edmund Hillary; Aoraki / Mount Cook	Campbell Island scene Hoiho (yellow-eyed penguin); Bulbinella rossii (Ross lily); Pleurophyllum speciosum (Campbell Island daisy); Bull kelp	Elizabeth II	October 2015
		$10	140 × 68 mm (5.5 × 2.7 in)	Blue	Kate Sheppard; White camellia flowers	River scene Whio (blue duck); Parahebe catarractae Blechnum fern	Elizabeth II	October 2015
		$20	145 × 70 mm (5.7 × 2.8 in)	Green	Elizabeth II; New Zealand Parliament Buildings	New Zealand alpine scene Kārearea (New Zealand falcon); Marlborough rock daisy Red tussock in flower Mount Tapuae-O-Uenuku	Elizabeth II	May 2016
		$50	150 × 72 mm (5.9 × 2.8 in)	Purple	Sir Āpirana Ngata; Porourangi Meeting House	Conifer broadleaf forest scene Kōkako (blue wattled crow); Supplejack (kareao); Sky-blue mushroom	Elizabeth II	May 2016
		$100	155 × 74 mm (6.1 × 2.9 in)	Red	Lord Rutherford of Nelson; Nobel Prize medal	Beech forest scene Mohua (yellowhead); Red beech South Island lichen moth	Elizabeth II	May 2016
These images are to scale at 0.7 pixel per millimetre (18 pixel per inch). For table standards, see the banknote specification table. See also New Zealand dollar.

== Past banknotes ==
Due to changes in printer, designs, and base material, there have been several designs on New Zealand banknotes. With the exception of the demonetised $1 and $2 notes, all decimal notes are still legal tender, although it is rare to see them in regular circulation.

Image		Value	Dimensions	Main Colour	Description			Date of issue
Obverse	Reverse	Value	Dimensions	Main Colour	Obverse	Reverse	Watermark	Date of issue
Series 3 (1967)
		$1	140 × 70 mm (5.5 × 2.8 in)	Brown	Elizabeth II	Fantail; New Zealand clematis	Captain James Cook	10 July 1967
		$2	145 × 72.5 mm (5.71 × 2.85 in)	Purple	Elizabeth II	Rifleman; Mistletoe	Captain James Cook	10 July 1967
		$5	150 × 75 mm (5.9 × 3.0 in)	Orange	Elizabeth II	Tūī; Kōwhai	Captain James Cook	10 July 1967
		$10	155 × 77.5 mm (6.10 × 3.05 in)	Blue	Elizabeth II	Kea; Mount Cook lily	Captain James Cook	10 July 1967
		$20	160 × 80 mm (6.3 × 3.1 in)	Green	Elizabeth II	New Zealand pigeon Miro	Captain James Cook	10 July 1967
		$100	160 × 80 mm (6.3 × 3.1 in)	Red	Elizabeth II	Takahē; Mountain daisy	Captain James Cook	10 July 1967
Series 4 (1981)
		$1	140 × 70 mm (5.5 × 2.8 in)	Brown	Elizabeth II	Fantail; New Zealand clematis	Captain James Cook	1981
		$2	145 × 72.5 mm (5.71 × 2.85 in)	Purple	Elizabeth II	Rifleman; Mistletoe	Captain James Cook	1981
		$5	150 × 75 mm (5.9 × 3.0 in)	Orange	Elizabeth II	Tūī; Kōwhai	Captain James Cook	1981
		$10	155 × 77.5 mm (6.10 × 3.05 in)	Blue	Elizabeth II	Kea; Mount Cook lily	Captain James Cook	1981
		$20	160 × 80 mm (6.3 × 3.1 in)	Green	Elizabeth II	New Zealand pigeon Miro	Captain James Cook	1981
		$50	160 × 80 mm (6.3 × 3.1 in)	Orange/Mango	Elizabeth II	Morepork; Pōhutukawa	Captain James Cook	1983
		$100	160 × 80 mm (6.3 × 3.1 in)	Red	Elizabeth II	Takahē; Mountain daisy	Captain James Cook	1981
Series 5 (1992)
		$5	135 × 66 mm (5.3 × 2.6 in)	Orange	Sir Edmund Hillary; Aoraki / Mount Cook; Massey Ferguson tractor	Hoiho (yellow-eyed penguin); Campbell Island scene	Elizabeth II	1992
		$10	140 × 68 mm (5.5 × 2.7 in)	Blue	Kate Sheppard; White camellia flowers	Whio (blue duck); River scene	Elizabeth II	1992
		$20	145 × 70 mm (5.7 × 2.8 in)	Green	Elizabeth II; New Zealand Parliament Buildings	Kārearea (New Zealand falcon); New Zealand alpine scene	Elizabeth II	1992
		$50	150 × 72 mm (5.9 × 2.8 in)	Purple	Sir Āpirana Ngata; Porourangi Meeting House	Kōkako (blue wattled crow); Conifer broadleaf forest scene	Elizabeth II	1992
		$100	155 × 74 mm (6.1 × 2.9 in)	Red	Lord Rutherford of Nelson; Nobel Prize medal	Mohua (yellowhead); Beech forest scene	Elizabeth II	1992
Series 6 (1999)
		$5	135 × 66 mm (5.3 × 2.6 in)	Orange	Sir Edmund Hillary; Aoraki / Mount Cook; Massey Ferguson tractor	Hoiho (yellow-eyed penguin); Campbell Island scene	Elizabeth II	1999
		$10	140 × 68 mm (5.5 × 2.7 in)	Blue	Kate Sheppard; White camellia flowers	Whio (blue duck); River scene	Elizabeth II	1999
		$20	145 × 70 mm (5.7 × 2.8 in)	Green	Queen Elizabeth II; New Zealand Parliament Buildings	Kārearea (New Zealand falcon); New Zealand alpine scene	Elizabeth II	1999
		$50	150 × 72 mm (5.9 × 2.8 in)	Purple	Sir Āpirana Ngata; Porourangi Meeting House	Kōkako (blue wattled crow); Conifer broadleaf forest scene	Elizabeth II	1999
		$100	155 × 74 mm (6.1 × 2.9 in)	Red	Lord Rutherford of Nelson; Nobel Prize medal	Mohua (yellowhead); Beech forest scene	Elizabeth II	1999
These images are to scale at 0.7 pixel per millimetre (18 pixel per inch). For table standards, see the banknote specification table.

== Commemorative banknotes ==
Value	Dimensions	Main Colour	Description			Date of issue
Value	Dimensions	Main Colour	Obverse	Reverse	Watermark	Date of issue
$10	155 × 77.5 mm (6.10 × 3.05 in)	Blue	The same as the standard Series 4 ten-dollar note, but with the kōtuku (white heron) logo of the 1990 Commission, which organised celebrations to commemorate 150 years since the signing of the Treaty of Waitangi.	Treaty of Waitangi signing scene.	Captain James Cook	1990
$10	140 × 68 mm (5.5 × 2.7 in)	Blue	The Journey - Socially and Technologically; A Māori waka to represent the Māori migration to New Zealand around 1000 AD; binary digits and satellite dish to represent the digital age	The Kiwi Spirit - A Sense of Adventure; Several images representing the Kiwi lifestyle.	A Māori carved face	October 1999

== Security features ==
New Zealand's banknotes incorporate many security features to prevent counterfeiting. Recent polymer banknotes also have a distinctive plastic feel and should not tear easily.

Some of the security features on the Series 7 notes include:

- The large transparent window on the right-hand side (when looking at the front of the note) contains intricate details, such as the denomination of the banknote and a detailed border showing ferns and koru patterns. There is also a metallic feature in the window showing a bird's silhouette, a map of New Zealand, silver ferns, and a 3D feature showing the denomination of the banknote.
- The front and back of the banknote have raised ink that can be felt. On the front of the banknote, the large number, the portrait and the words "Reserve Bank of New Zealand Te Pūtea Matua" are raised; on the back, the large number, the featured bird and the words "New Zealand" and "Aotearoa" are raised.
- When held up to the light, small puzzle pieces on the front and back of the note form a complete number (the denomination of the note).
- A silhouette of a bird appears on the left-hand side of the note above the serial number. When held up to the light, the fern window on the back of the note shines through the silhouette of the bird. As the note is moved, the colour of the bird changes. A similar colour-changing effect can be seen in the detailed metallic imagery in the large transparent window.

The security features on the previous Series 6 notes include:

- The transparent window on the right-hand side (when looking at the front of the note) is oval-shaped and contains the embossed denomination of the currency. The transparent window on the left hand side is in the shape of a curved fern leaf.
- There is a curved fern leaf directly above the transparent fern on both sides of the note. When held up to a light source, the fern on one side should match perfectly with the fern on the other side.
- When the note is held up to a light source, a watermark image of Elizabeth II should be seen in the area to the left of the transparent oval (when looking at the front of the note).
- The front and back of the banknote have raised ink that can be felt.
- Tiny micro-printed letters, reading "RBNZ", should be visible with a magnifying glass in the bottom right of the note (in the band between the portrait and the denomination).
- The serial number of the note should be printed both horizontally and vertically on the note, and both numbers should be the same.
- Under ultra-violet light, the note should appear dull, except for a patch on the front showing the denomination of the note that glows under UV light.

== Old or damaged banknotes ==
The Reserve Bank accepts all New Zealand currency for payment at face value. This applies to all demonetised or withdrawn currency, however such currency need not be accepted by money changers as it is no longer legal tender. All decimal banknotes issued since 1967 remain legal tender except one-dollar and two-dollar notes, which were withdrawn in 1991.

In general, the Reserve Bank will replace damaged notes as long as they are recognisable. However, if any note is missing a piece then it may be paid out at less than face value, depending on the amount of the note remaining. For example, if a banknote with over two-thirds of its original size is presented, the bank shall provide the customer with its full value. For a note between one-third and two-thirds of its original size, the bank shall pay half its value, whereas notes with less than one-third remaining are considered valueless.

== See also ==
- Coins of the New Zealand dollar (currently ten cents to two dollars)
