= New Zealand one hundred-dollar note =

Current denomination of New Zealand currency

One hundred dollars
- Country: New Zealand
- Value: 100 NZD
- Width: 155 mm
- Height: 74 mm
- Material used: Polymer
- Years of printing: 1967–present

Obverse
- Design: Ernest Rutherford
- Design date: 1992 (original design); May 2016 (current design)

Reverse
- Design: Mōhua
- Design date: 1992 (original design); May 2016 (current design)

The New Zealand one-hundred-dollar note is a New Zealand banknote. It is issued by the Reserve Bank of New Zealand and since 1999 has been a polymer banknote. It was first issued on 10 July 1967 when New Zealand decimalised its currency, changing from the New Zealand pound to the New Zealand dollar. The note originally had an image of Queen Elizabeth II on the front; since 1992 it has had an image of Ernest Rutherford.

== Design ==
There have been seven series of New Zealand banknotes. The first two series used the New Zealand pound, and the one-hundred-dollar note was introduced with the third series.

=== Third series (1967–1981) ===
The first dollar notes were issued with the introduction of the New Zealand dollar on 10 July 1967, replacing their pound note predecessors at the rate of two dollars to the pound. They were made using cotton-based paper, and the hundred-dollar notes used the same red colour as the fifty-pound note it replaced, to aid cash-handling during the transition. The design was selected by a six-person design committee appointed in 1964, which included Alexander McLintock, Stewart Bell Maclennan and Professor John Simpson, Dean of the Faculty of Fine Arts at the University of Canterbury.

All the notes of this series had Queen Elizabeth II on the front, and a watermark of Captain James Cook. They also had a New Zealand bird and the plant most closely associated with that species on the back. The back of the one-hundred-dollar note featured a takahē, one of the rarest birds in New Zealand at the time, which had been thought extinct until the 1940s, and a mountain daisy.

=== Fourth series (1982–1990) ===
In late 1981, the Reserve Bank switched to a different printer which meant that new printing plates had to be made. The only changes with this series were minor drawing changes and an update to the portrait of Elizabeth II. A fifty-dollar note was also introduced in 1983 to fill an apparent gap between the twenty-dollar and one-hundred-dollar notes.

=== Fifth series (1992–1999) ===
New Zealand's banknotes were completely re-designed in the 1990s to introduce uniquely New Zealand designs. The new one-hundred-dollar note featured Lord Rutherford of Nelson on the front, with the Nobel Prize medal he won in 1908. The Nobel Foundation gave permission for the image of the medal to be used. The medal is overlaid by a graph showing the results of Rutherford’s investigations into naturally occurring radioactivity.

The back of the note features the mōhua which replaced the takahē on the earlier note, and the South Island lichen moth. The background is the Eglinton Valley, which is in Fiordland National Park in the South Island. Another feature was the tukutuku patterning on the front, called "whakaaro kotahi", taken from the Wharenui Kaakati at Whakatū Marae in Nelson.

=== Sixth issue (1999–2016) ===
In 1999, New Zealand changed from paper banknotes to polymer banknotes. The change increased the life of the banknotes and also allowed new and improved security features to prevent counterfeiting. The overall design of the notes remained unchanged albeit for slight modifications for the new security features.

=== Seventh issue (2016–present) ===
A new one-hundred-dollar note was released in May 2016 along with the newly designed twenty-dollar and fifty-dollar notes, as part of the Series 7 banknote release (described by the Reserve Bank as the "Brighter Money" series). The new five-dollar and ten-dollar notes had previously been released in October 2015.

The new series was introduced in order to add more security features to New Zealand banknotes. As surveys showed that the New Zealand public were generally content with the note design, very few design changes were made and the overall design remains similar to the Series 5 note. The note was brighter in colour and featured the Māori translation of Reserve Bank (Te Putea Matua), and "New Zealand, Aotearoa" on the back.

== Usage ==
At first the one-hundred-dollar note saw little use due to its high value; in terms of December 2018 dollars, it had the purchasing power equivalent to around $1,800 in July 1967, and around $395 in December 1981. By March 1982, only 120,500 $100 notes were in circulation; by comparison, 24 million $10 notes were in circulation.

Since 1993 however, holdings of the one-hundred-dollar note has overtaken holdings of five-dollar and ten-dollar notes, and have continued to increase. Reserve Bank research indicates that this could be because cash in New Zealand is being used less for transactional purposes and more as a store of value.

== Security features ==
New Zealand's banknotes incorporate many security features to prevent counterfeiting. The newer polymer banknotes have a distinctive plastic feel and should not tear easily.

Security features on the Series 7 one-hundred-dollar note include a large transparent window containing intricate details, such as the denomination of the note and a detailed border with ferns and koru patterns. When held up to the light, small puzzle pieces on the front and back of the note form a complete number 100 (the denomination of the note). The front and back of the banknote have raised ink that can be felt. On the front of the banknote, the large number 100, the portrait and the words "Reserve Bank of New Zealand Te Pūtea Matua" are raised; on the back, the large number 100, the featured bird and the words "New Zealand" and "Aotearoa" are raised.

The Series 6 security features include that, when the note is shown to the light, a shadow image of Elizabeth II is displayed. There is intaglio printing through the note which gives it an embossed feel. Under UV light a fluorescent patch will appear showing "100", the denomination of the note. The note has a see-through window in the shape of fern on the left and an oval-shaped window on the right. There is an image of a fern located above the see-through window, and the two sides should match perfectly when held up to the light.
