= $20 =

There are many $20 banknotes, bills or coins, including:

- Australian twenty-dollar note
- Canadian twenty-dollar note
- New Zealand twenty-dollar note
- United States twenty-dollar bill
- Nicaraguan twenty-cordoba note
- One of the banknotes of the Hong Kong dollar
- One of the banknotes of Zimbabwe

Other currencies that issue $20 banknotes, bills or coins are:

- Argentine peso
- Bahamian dollar
- Barbadian dollar
- Belize dollar
- Bermudian dollar
- Brazilian real
- Cape Verdean escudo
- Colombian peso
- Cook Islands dollar
- Cuban peso
- Dominican peso
- East Caribbean dollar
- Fijian dollar
- Guyanese dollar
- Jamaican dollar
- Liberian dollar
- Mexican peso
- Mozambican metical
- Namibian dollar
- Samoan tālā
- Singapore dollar
- Solomon Islands dollar
- Surinamese dollar
- New Taiwan dollar
- Tongan paʻanga
- Trinidad and Tobago dollar
- Uruguayan peso
