= 10 dollar note =

Banknotes with the denomination of 10 dollars have been issued by a number of countries; see the following articles:

- United States ten-dollar bill
- Australian ten-dollar note
- Canadian ten-dollar note
- New Zealand ten-dollar note
- Banknotes of the Hong Kong dollar
