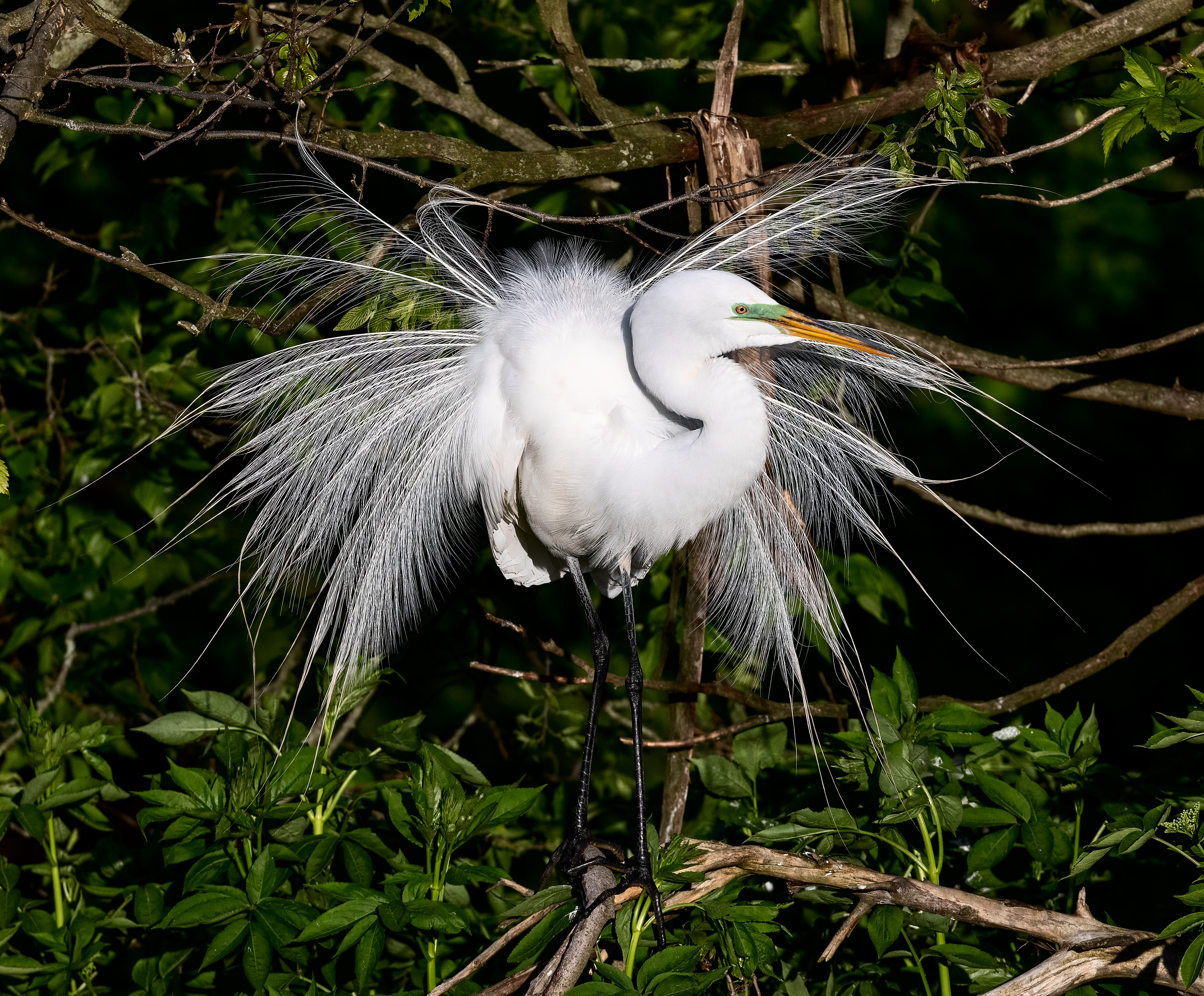
- Great egret in full breeding plumage
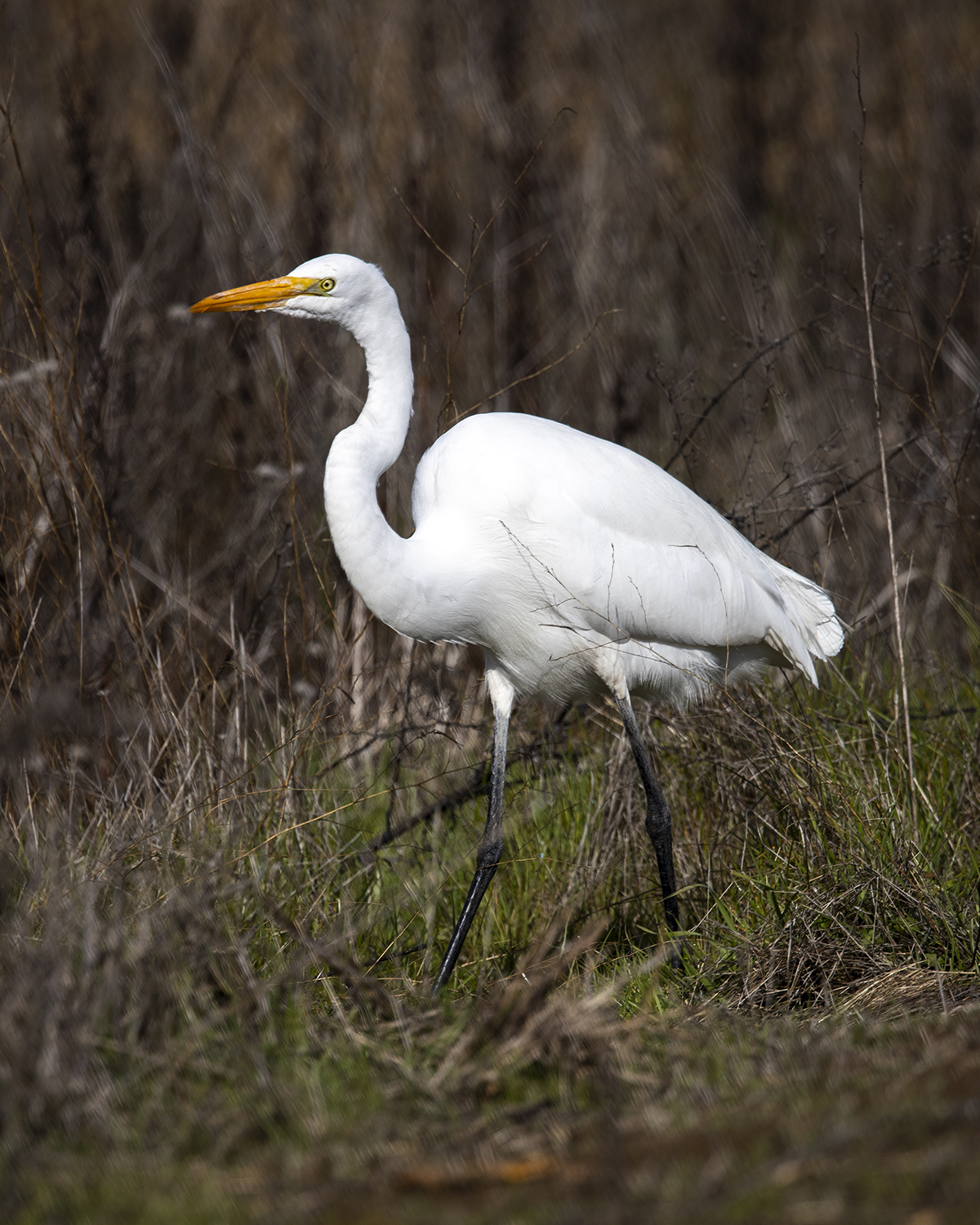
- Non-breeding plumage: Great Egret call in Somme, France

Conservation status
- Least Concern (IUCN 3.1)

Scientific classification
- Kingdom: Animalia
- Phylum: Chordata
- Class: Aves
- Order: Pelecaniformes
- Family: Ardeidae
- Genus: Ardea
- Species: A. alba

Binomial name
- Ardea alba Linnaeus, 1758
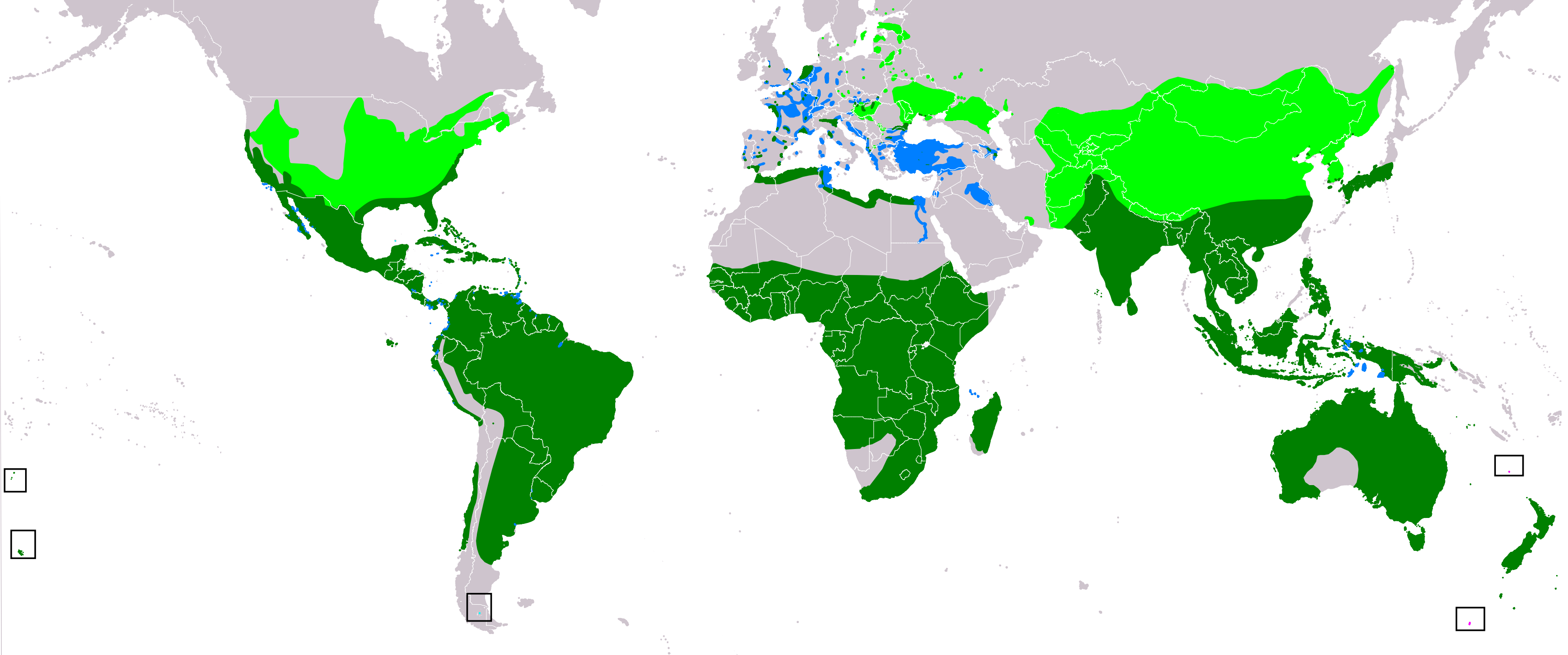
- Breeding Resident Non-breeding Passage Vagrant (seasonality uncertain)

Synonyms
- Herodias egretta Boie, 1822; Casmerodius egretta Gloger, 1842; Casmerodius albus Oberholser, 1919; Egretta alba (Cramp and Simmons, 1977)

= Great egret =

Species of bird

The great egret (Ardea alba), also known as the common egret, large egret, great white egret, or great white heron, is a large, widely distributed egret. The four subspecies occur in Asia, Africa, the Americas, and southern Europe. Recently, it has also been spreading to more northern areas of Europe. Distributed across most of the tropical and warmer temperate regions of the world, it builds tree nests in colonies close to water.

== Taxonomy ==
The great egret was formally described in 1758 by the Swedish naturalist Carl Linnaeus in the tenth edition of his Systema Naturae under the binomial name Ardea alba. He specified the type locality as Europe. The scientific name comes from Latin ardea, "heron", and alba, "white".

Like all egrets, it is a member of the heron family, Ardeidae. Traditionally classified with the storks in the Ciconiiformes, the Ardeidae are closer relatives of pelicans and belong in the Pelecaniformes, instead. The great egret, unlike the typical egrets, does not belong to the genus Egretta, but together with the great herons is today placed in Ardea. In the past, however, it was sometimes placed in Egretta or separated in a monotypic genus Casmerodius.

The Old World population is often referred to as the "great white egret". This species is sometimes confused with the great white heron of the Caribbean, which is a white morph of the closely related great blue heron.

As of October 20, 2026, the American Ornithological Society considers the Old World and New World populations to be separate species. The Old World population retains the scientific name Ardea alba and is given the common name "great white egret". The New World population is given the scientific name Ardea egretta and the common name "American egret". Other authorities have yet to adopt this split.

=== Subspecies ===
Four subspecies occur in various parts of the world, which differ but little. Differences among them include bare-part coloration in the breeding season and size. The smallest subspecies, A. a. modesta, occurs in Asia and Australasia; some taxonomists consider it to be a full species, the eastern great egret (Ardea modesta), but most scientists treat it as a subspecies.

- A. a. alba Linnaeus, 1758 – the nominate subspecies occurs in Europe and across the Palearctic
- A. a. egretta Gmelin, JF, 1789 – is distributed in the Americas
- A. a. melanorhynchos Wagler, 1827 – ranges in Africa
- A. a. modesta Gray, JE, 1831 – eastern great egret is distributed in India, Southeast Asia, East Asia and Oceania

== Description ==
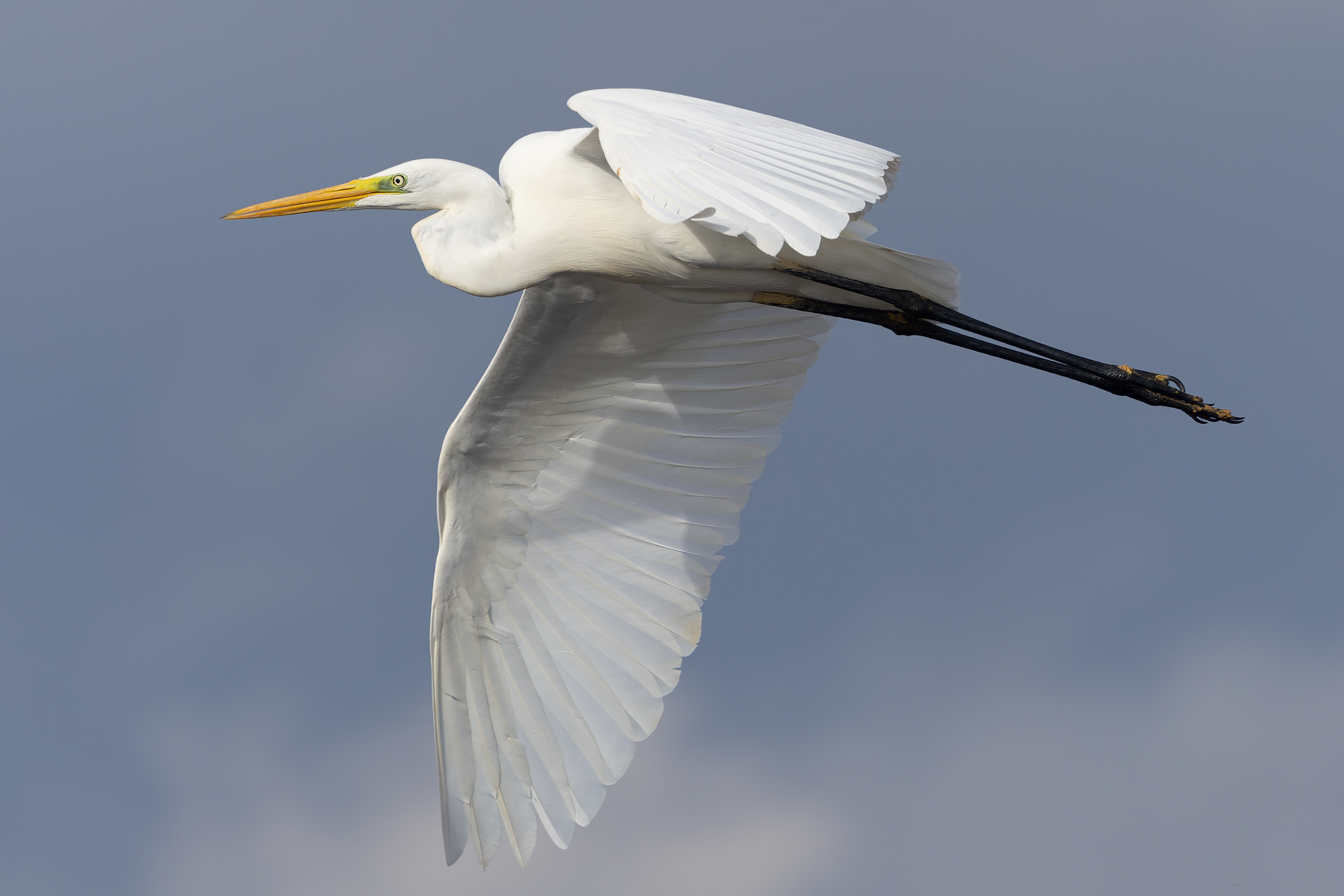
Adult great egret in flight

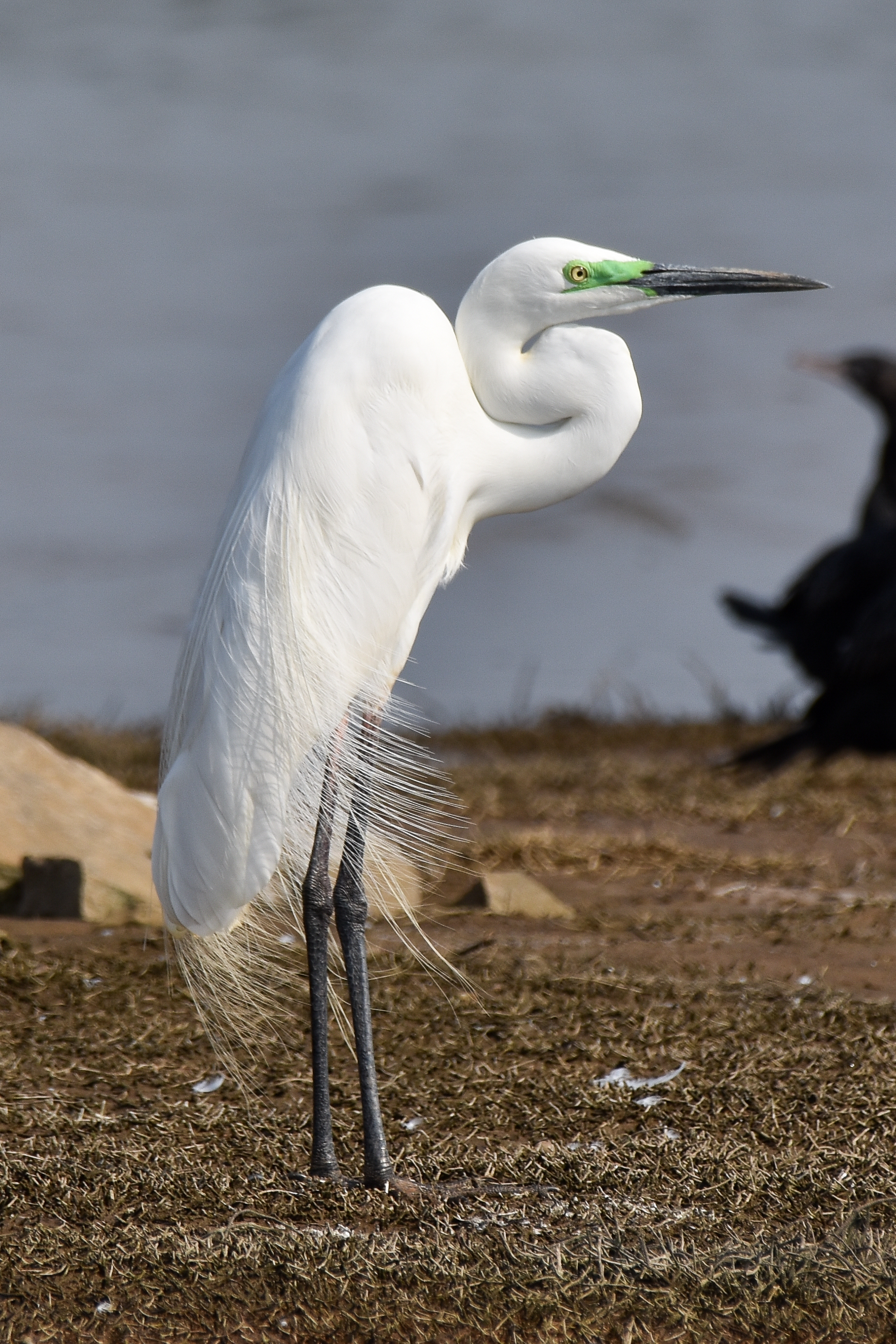
Breeding plumage

The great egret is a large heron with all-white plumage. Standing up to 1 m (3 ft 3 in) tall, this species can measure 80 to 104 cm (31 to 41 in) in length with a wingspan of 131 to 170 cm (52 to 67 in). Body mass can range from 700 to 1,500 g (25 to 53 oz), with an average around 1,000 g (35 oz). It is thus only slightly smaller than the great blue or grey heron (A. cinerea). Apart from size, the great egret can be distinguished from other white egrets by its yellow bill and black legs and feet, though the bill may become darker and the lower legs lighter in the breeding season. In breeding plumage, delicate ornamental feathers are borne on the back. Males and females are identical in appearance; juveniles look like nonbreeding adults. It may be differentiated from the intermediate egret (Ardea intermedia) by the gape, which extends well beyond the back of the eye in case of the great egret, but ends just behind the eye in case of the intermediate egret.

Its flight is slow with its neck retracted. This is characteristic of herons and bitterns, and distinguishes them from storks, cranes, ibises, and spoonbills, which extend their necks in flight. The great egret walks with its neck extended and wings held close. The great egret is not normally a vocal bird; it gives a low, hoarse croak when disturbed, and at breeding colonies, it often gives a loud croaking cuk cuk cuk and higher-pitched squawks.

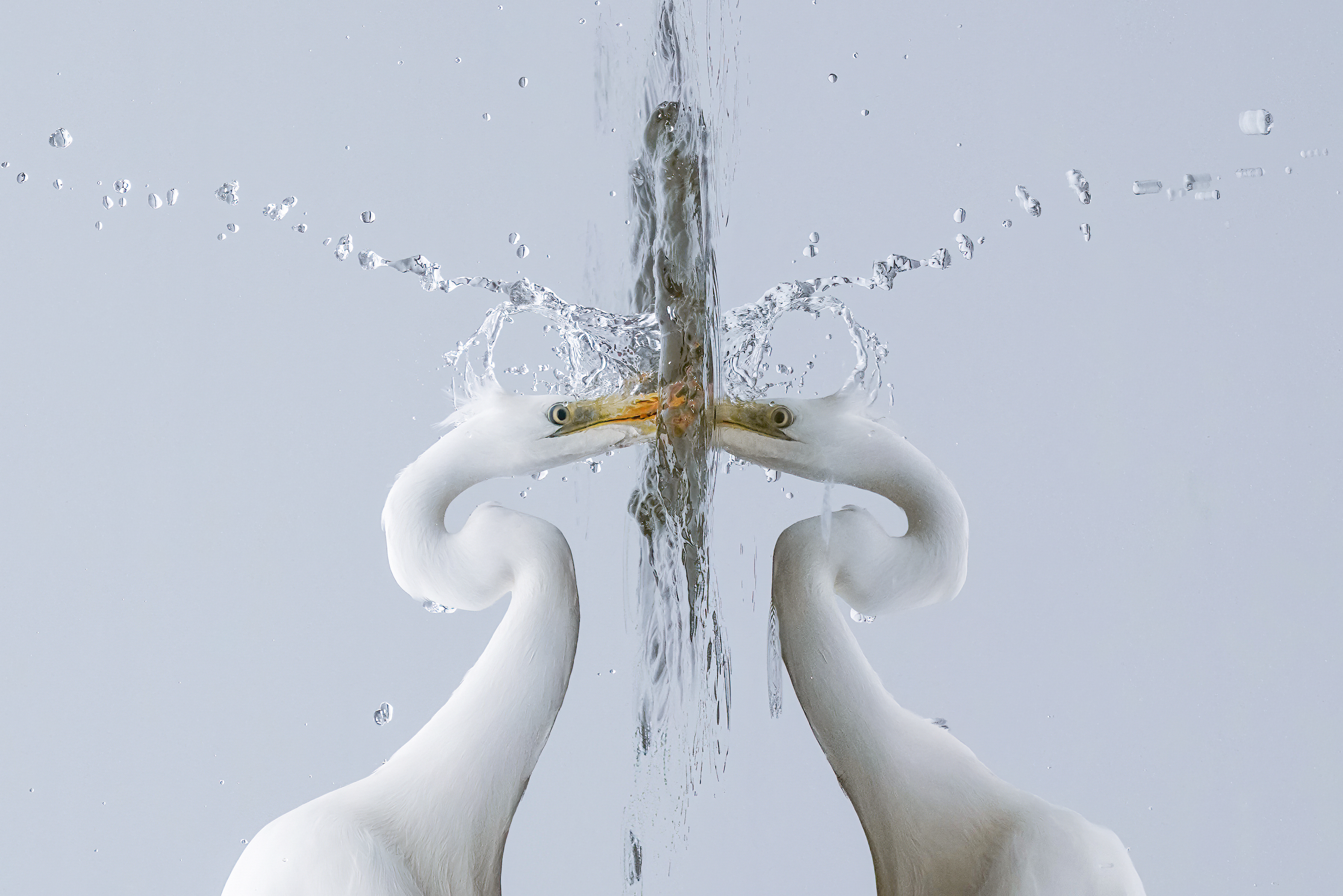
Great egret fishing during a foggy day at Champ-Pittet, Switzerland

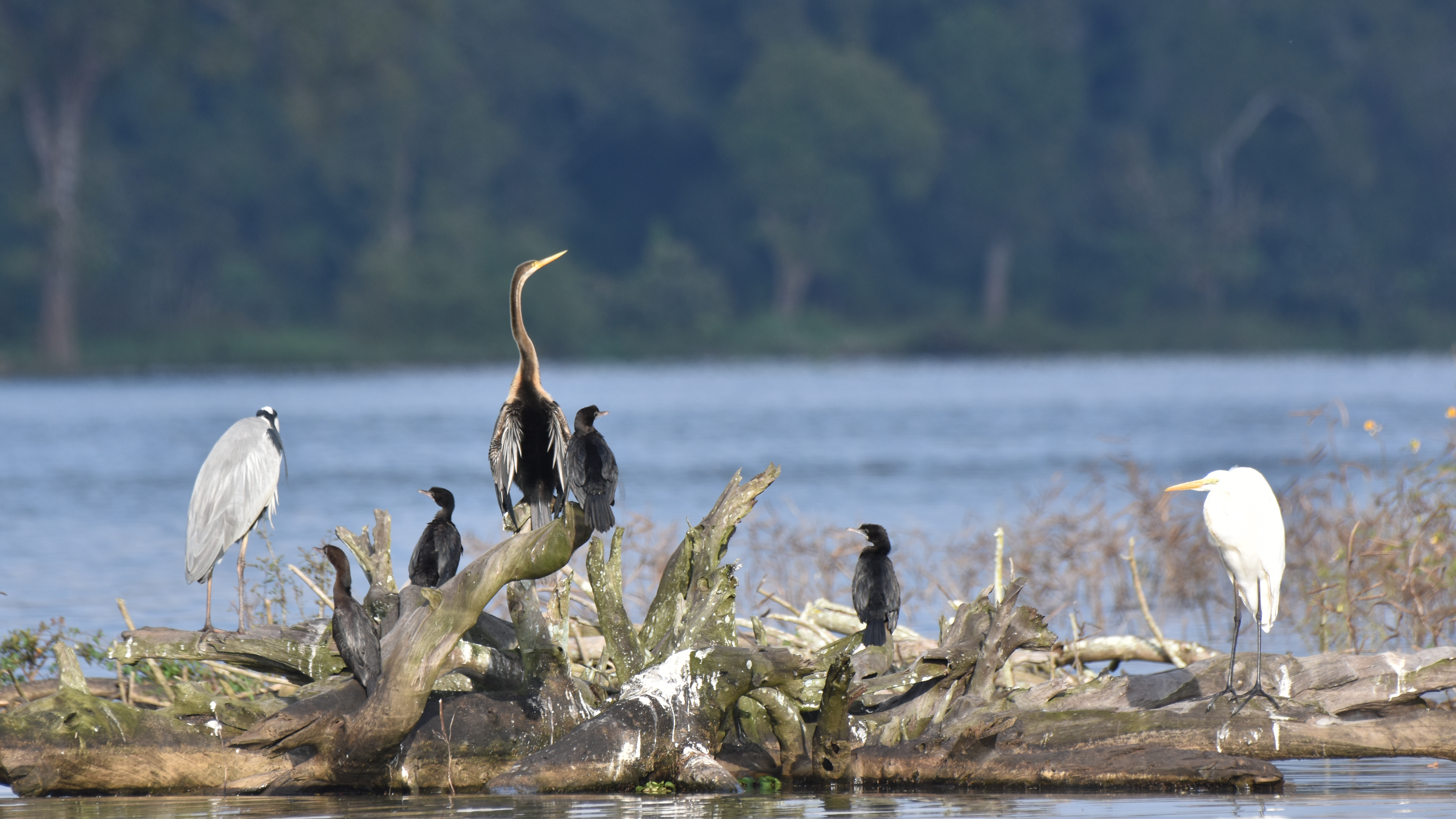
Sharing space on a log with a grey heron (Ardea cinerea), Oriental darter (Anhinga melanogaster) and a group of little cormorants (Microcarbo niger)

Owing to its wide distribution across so much of the Americas, as well as Africa, Europe and Asia, the great egret shares its habitat with many other similar species. For example, the little egret (Egretta garzetta), intermediate egret (Ardea intermedia), Chinese egret (Egretta eulophotes), and the western reef heron (Egretta gularis). In the Americas, the snowy egret (Egretta thula)—a medium-sized heron that shares the same habitat as the great egret—is one such species. The snowy egret is readily distinguished from the great egret because it is noticeably smaller, and it has a more slender bill which is black in color and yellow feet, whereas the great egret has a yellow bill and black feet. Another species that—in North America—is easily confused with the great egret is the white morph of the great blue heron (Ardea herodias). The great blue heron is a bit larger, and has a thicker bill than that of the great egret.

== Distribution and habitat ==
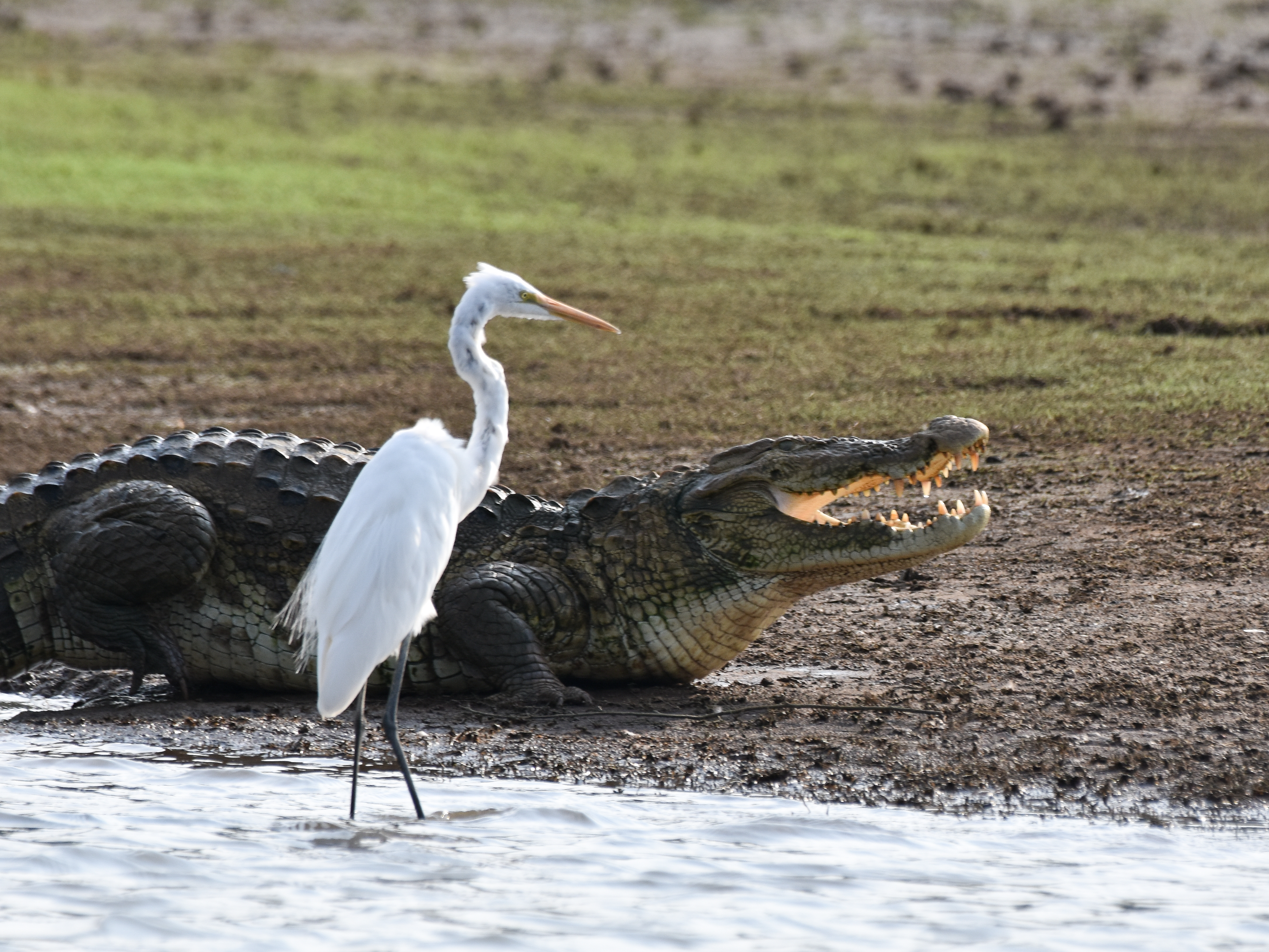
Non-breeding adult wading near a mugger crocodile

The great egret has a large and expanding range, occurring worldwide in temperate and tropical habitats. It is found across the Sun Belt of the United States and the Neotropics.

=== Nordic countries ===
In the Nordic countries, it was historically a rare visitor. The first breeding was observed in Sweden in 2012 and in Denmark in 2014. In 2018, a pair of great egrets nested in Finland for the first time, raising four young in a grey heron colony in Porvoo.

=== Presence in Great Britain ===
On 22 May 2012, a pair of great egrets was observed nesting in the UK for the first time at the Shapwick Heath nature reserve in Somerset. The species was a rare visitor to the UK and Ben Aviss of the BBC stated that the news could mean the UK's first great egret colony had become established. The following week, Kevin Anderson of Natural England confirmed a great egret chick had hatched, making it a new breeding bird record for the UK. In 2017, seven nests in Somerset fledged 17 young, and a second breeding site was announced at Holkham National Nature Reserve in Norfolk where a pair fledged three young. In August 2024, RSPB Scotland announced that a pair had raised three chicks at their Loch of Strathbeg nature reserve in North Aberdeenshire, the first chicks to hatch in Scotland. In its 2025 Wildlife on Reserves report, the RSPB refers to 56 pairs nesting across five of the society's nature reserves, including new nests at Cors Ddyga in Wales.

== Behaviour and ecology ==
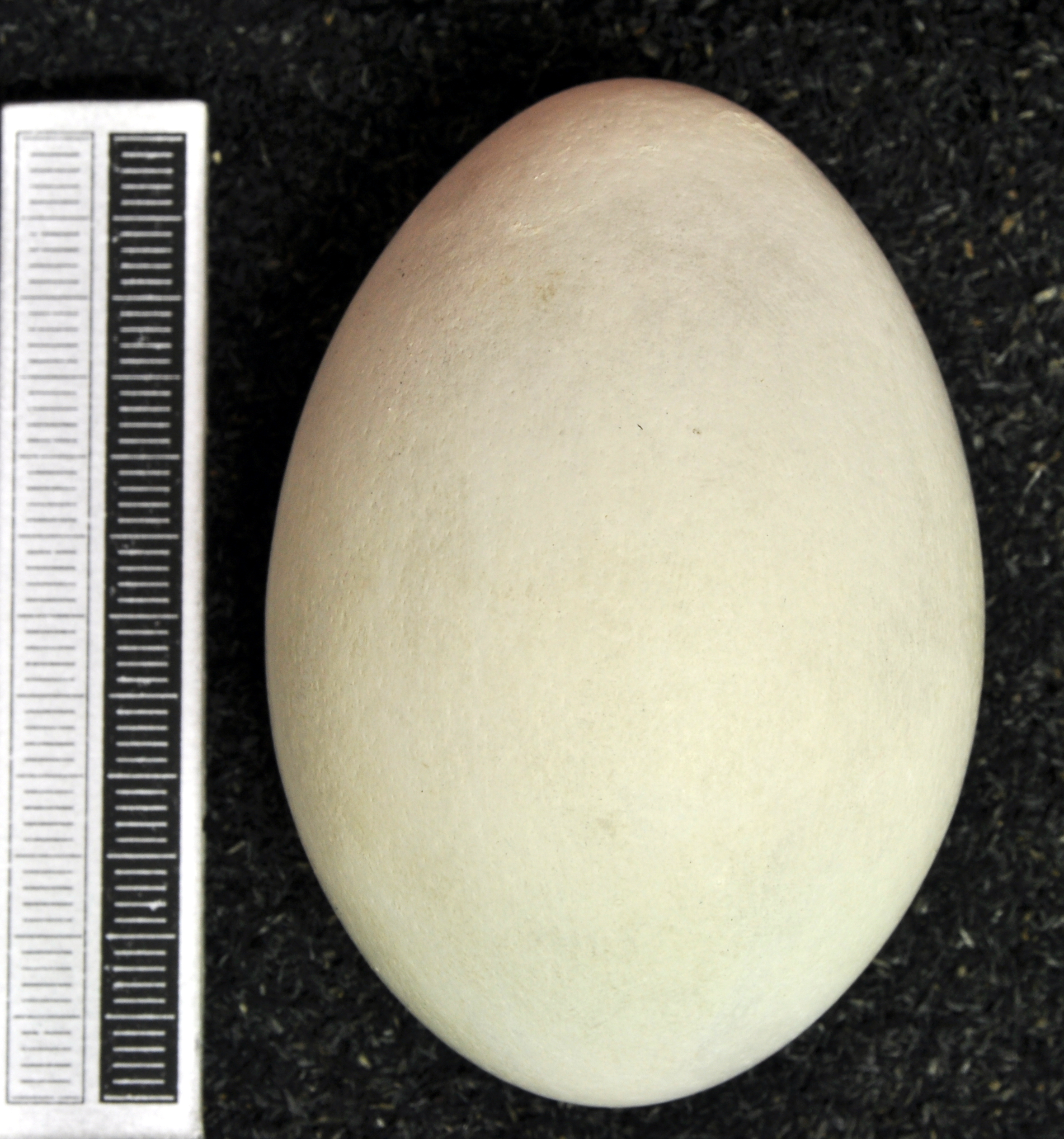
Egg in the collection of Museum Wiesbaden

The great egret breeds in colonies in trees close to large lakes with reed beds or other extensive wetlands, preferably at height of 3.0–12.2 m (10–40 ft). It begins to breed at 2–3 years of age by forming monogamous pairs each season. Whether the pairing carries over to the next season is not known. The male selects the nest area, starts a nest, and then attracts a female. The nest, made of sticks and lined with plant material, could be up to 3 feet across. Up to six bluish green eggs are laid at one time. Both sexes incubate the eggs, and the incubation period is 23–26 days. The young are fed by regurgitation by both parents and are able to fly within 6–7 weeks.

=== Diet ===
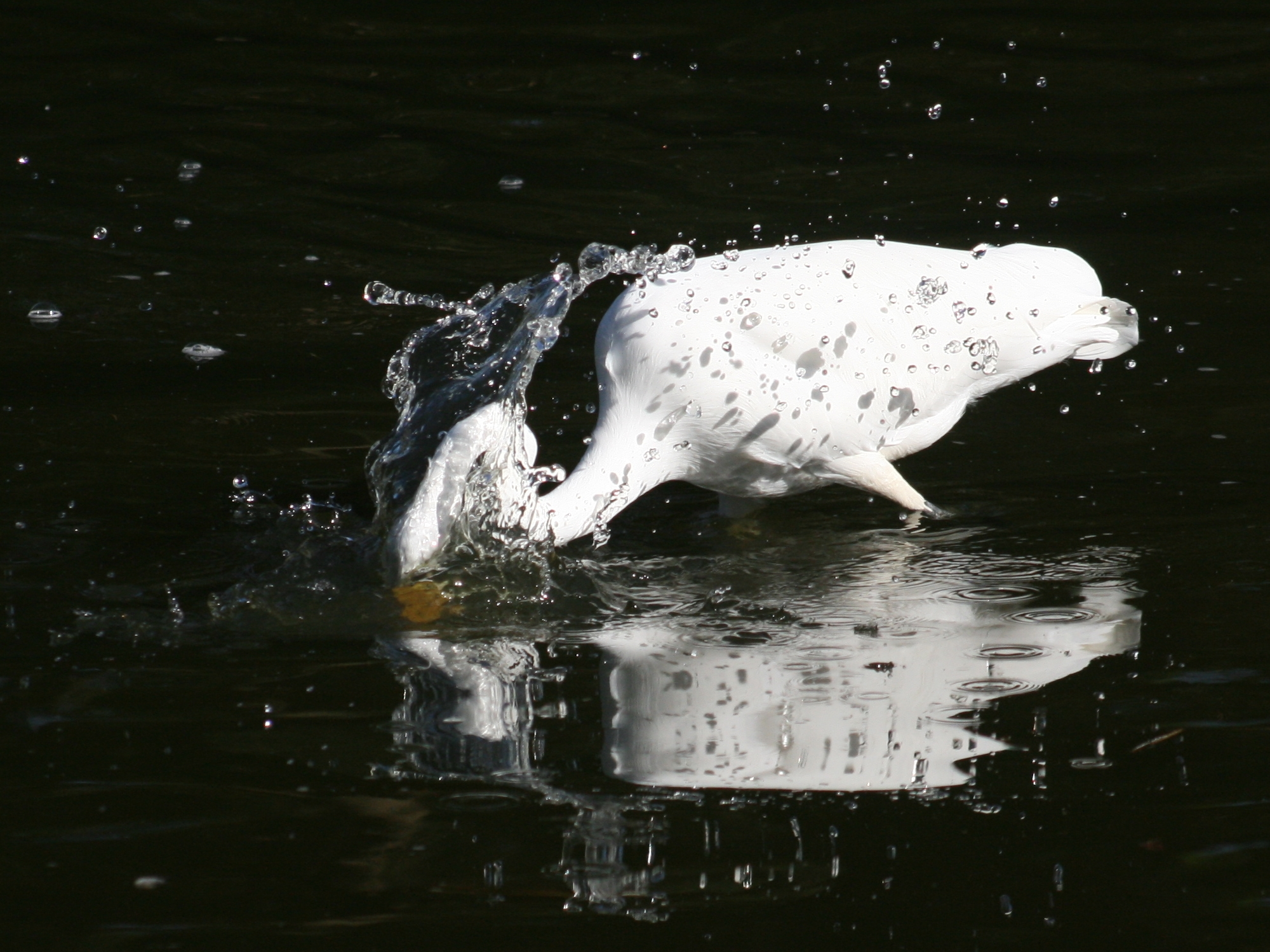
Spearing a fish

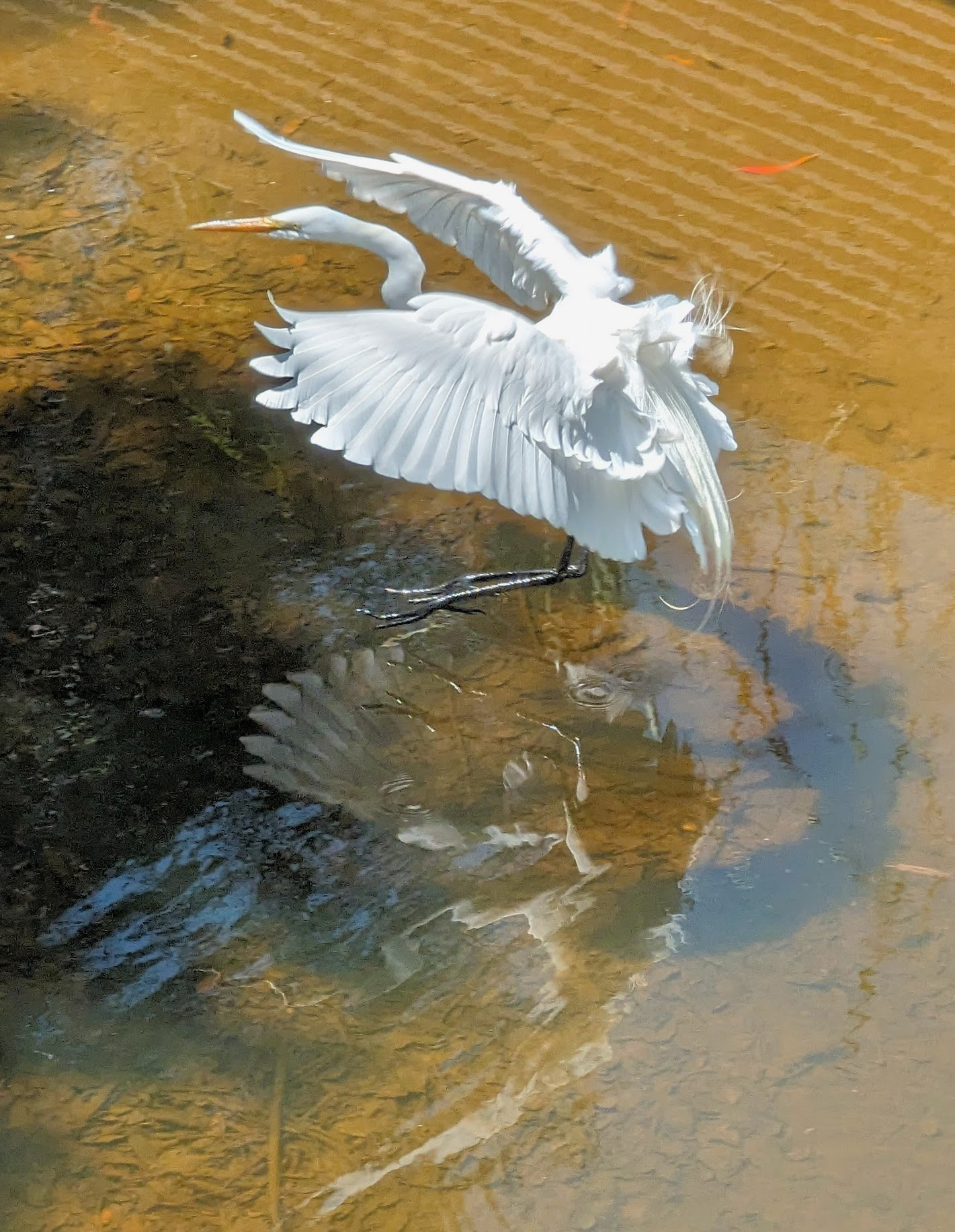
Landing in Matadero Creek

The great egret forages in shallow water or in drier habitats, feeding mainly on fish, frogs, other amphibians, mice, snakes, crayfish, aquatic insects, grasshoppers, and other insects

=== Parasites ===
A long-running field study (1962–2013) suggested that the great egrets of central Europe host 17 different helminth species. Juvenile great egrets were shown to host fewer species, but the intensity of infection was higher in the juveniles than in the adults. Of the digeneans found in central European great egrets, numerous species likely infected their definitive hosts outside of central Europe itself.

== Threats ==
In North America, large numbers of great egrets were killed around the end of the 19th century so that their plumes, known as "aigrettes", could be used to decorate hats. Numbers have since recovered as a result of conservation measures. Its range has expanded as far north as southern Canada. However, in some parts of the southern United States, its numbers have declined due to habitat loss, particularly wetland degradation through drainage, grazing, clearing, burning, increased salinity, groundwater extraction and invasion by exotic plants. Nevertheless, the species adapts well to human habitation and can be readily seen near wetlands and bodies of water in urban and suburban areas.

== In culture ==
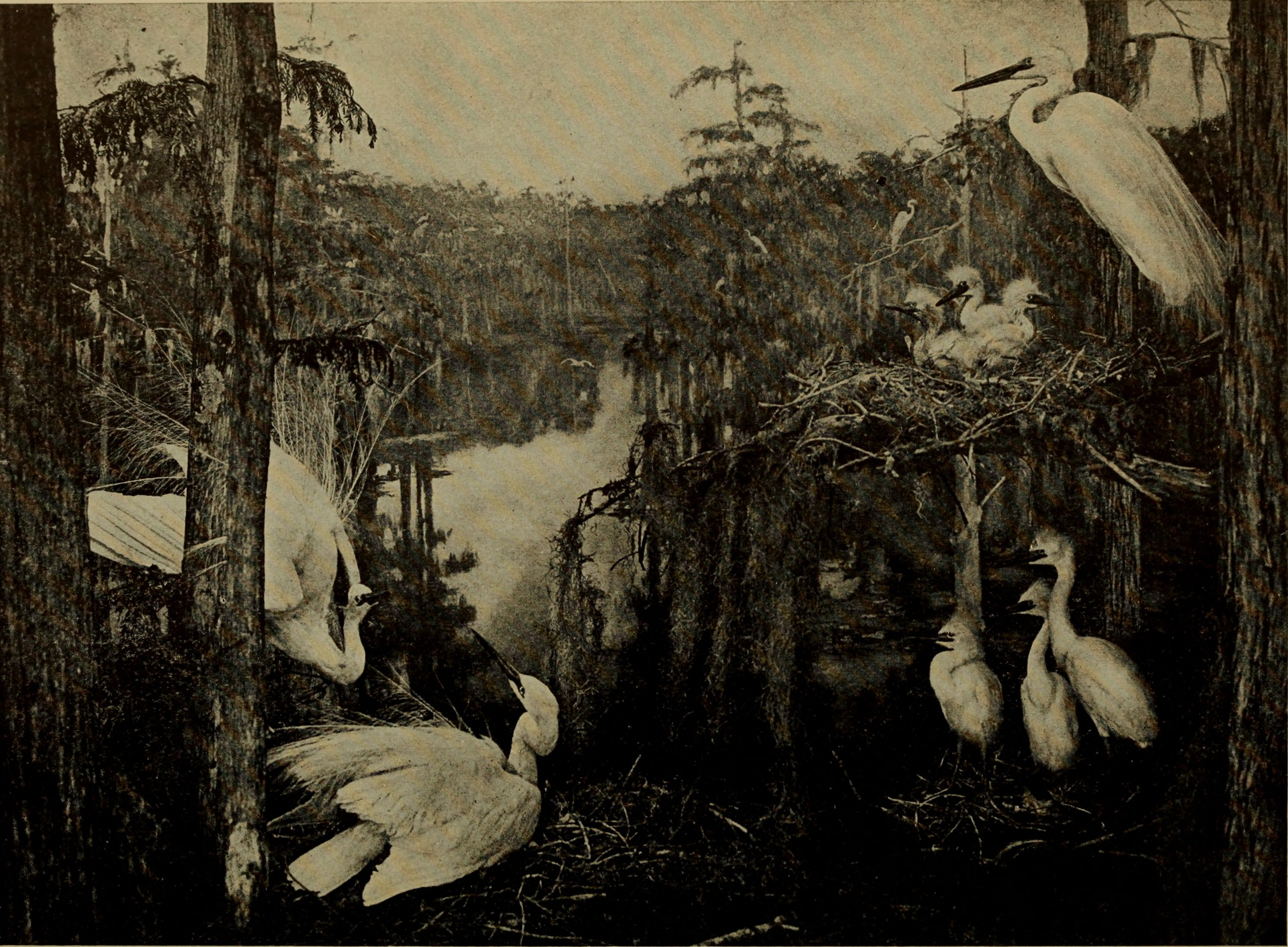
Taxidermied specimens, American Museum of Natural History

Great egret capturing and swallowing a fish (partially slowed video)

A great egret in the Yolo Bypass Wildlife Area

The great egret is depicted on the reverse side of a 5-Brazilian real banknote.

The great egret is the symbol of the National Audubon Society.

An airbrushed photograph of a great egret in breeding plumage by Werner Krutein is featured in the cover art of the 1992 Faith No More album Angel Dust.

In Belarus, a commemorative coin has the image of a great egret. The great egret also features on the New Zealand $2 coin and on the Hungarian 5-forint coin.
