= New Zealand fifty-dollar note =

Current denomination of New Zealand currency

Fifty dollars
- Country: New Zealand
- Value: 50 NZD
- Width: 150 mm
- Height: 72 mm
- Material used: Polymer
- Years of printing: 1983–present

Obverse
- Design: Sir Āpirana Ngata
- Design date: 1992 (original design); May 2016 (current design)

Reverse
- Design: Kōkako, Pureora Forest Park
- Design date: 1992 (original design); May 2016 (current design)

The New Zealand fifty-dollar note is a New Zealand banknote. It is issued by the Reserve Bank of New Zealand and since 1999 has been a polymer banknote. It was first issued in 1983. The note originally had an image of Queen Elizabeth II on the front; since 1992 it has had an image of Sir Āpirana Ngata.

== Design ==
There have been seven series of New Zealand banknotes. The first two series used the New Zealand pound, and the third was issued with dollar decimalisation in 1967, which did not include a fifty-dollar note between the twenty-dollar and one-hundred-dollar notes.

=== Fourth series (1983–1991) ===
The first fifty dollar note introduced in 1983 (obverse left, reverse right; Reserve Bank of New Zealand)

The fourth series was a minor design update, principally including a new portrait of Elizabeth II on the fronts of all notes. The series included the first issue of a fifty-dollar note, using a yellow-orange colouring. The back of the note featured a morepork or ruru, New Zealand's only extant native owl. The owl was perched on a pōhutukawa, a tree found on New Zealand coasts. It used the same watermark of Captain James Cook as the other notes in the series.

=== Fifth series (1991–1999) ===
New Zealand's banknotes were completely re-designed in the 1990s to introduce uniquely New Zealand designs. Sir Āpirana Ngata, a New Zealand politician who played an important role in the Māori Renaissance, was featured on the new fifty-dollar note. The colour was changed to the current violet, partly to help distinguish it from the reddish orange of the five-dollar note. To the left of Ngata's portrait was the Porourangi meeting house at Waiomatatini Marae, near the town of Ruatoria. The design also featured a tukutuku pattern known as poutama (stairway to heaven) that is found at Porourangi meeting house. On the back was the kōkako (blue wattled crow) and the sky-blue mushroom (Entoloma hochstetteri), and in the background is Pureora Forest Park.

=== Sixth series (1999–2016) ===
In 1999, New Zealand changed from paper banknotes to polymer banknotes. The change increased the life of the banknotes and also allowed new and improved security features to prevent counterfeiting. The overall design of the notes remained unchanged albeit for slight modifications for the new security features.

=== Seventh series (2016–present) ===
New fifty-dollar banknotes were released in May 2016 as part of the Series 7 banknote release along with new twenty-dollar and one-hundred dollar notes (described by the Reserve Bank as the "Brighter Money" series). The new five-dollar and ten-dollar notes in Series 7 were released earlier in October 2015.

The new series was introduced in order to add more security features to New Zealand banknotes. As surveys showed that the New Zealand public were generally content with the note design, very few design changes were made and the overall design remains similar to the Series 5 note. The note was brighter in colour and featured the Māori translation of Reserve Bank (Te Putea Matua), and "New Zealand, Aotearoa" on the back.

== Security features ==
New Zealand's banknotes incorporate many security features to prevent counterfeiting. The newer polymer banknotes have a distinctive plastic feel and should not tear easily.

Security features on the Series 7 fifty-dollar note include a large transparent window containing intricate details, such as the denomination of the note and a detailed border with ferns and koru patterns. When held up to the light, small puzzle pieces on the front and back of the note form a complete number 50 (the denomination of the note). The front and back of the banknote have raised ink that can be felt. On the front of the banknote, the large number 50, the portrait and the words "Reserve Bank of New Zealand Te Pūtea Matua" are raised; on the back, the large number 50, the featured bird and the words "New Zealand" and "Aotearoa" are raised.

The Series 6 security features include that, when the note is shown to the light, a shadow image of Elizabeth II is displayed. There is intaglio printing through the note which gives it an embossed feel. Under UV light a fluorescent patch will appear showing "50", the denomination of the note. The note has a see-through window in the shape of fern on the left and an oval-shaped window on the right. There is an image of a fern located above the see-through window, and the two sides should match perfectly when held up to the light.
