= New Zealand one-dollar note =

Former denomination of New Zealand currency

One dollar
- Country: New Zealand
- Value: 1 New Zealand dollar
- Material used: Cotton-based paper
- Years of printing: 1967–1991

Obverse
- Design: Queen Elizabeth II
- Design date: 1967, updated portrait 1981

Reverse
- Design: New Zealand fantail and Clematis paniculata flowers
- Design date: 1967

The New Zealand one-dollar note was introduced on 10 July 1967 as part of the Reserve Bank of New Zealand's third issue round. The third issue round was the first round in which the official currency was denominated in dollars and utilised the decimal system. First issue and second issue rounds were valued in pounds and utilised the imperial system. The one dollar-note was officially removed from circulation in 1991, along with the two-dollar note, as one-dollar and two-dollar coins had commenced production the previous year.

The New Zealand one-dollar note featured Queen Elizabeth II on the obverse and a Fantail as well as several Clematis paniculata flowers on the reverse.

== History ==
The first New Zealand banknotes started development in 1932 and were issued in August 1934. This was known as the Series 1 or the first issue of bank notes which were denominated in pounds and the imperial system. The second issue was issued on 6 February 1940 and also utilised the imperial system. There has been 7 different series of notes issues with the seventh issue (issued in 2015) being the one currently in circulation.

The New Zealand one-dollar note was first issued by the Reserve Bank of New Zealand as part of the central bank's third issue round on 10 July 1967. This was the first time in which the official New Zealand currency was denominated in dollars and utilised the decimal system. Prior to the third issue, first issue and second issue notes utilised the imperial system denominated as pound, shillings, and pence. Alongside the one-dollar note the Third Issue included $2, $5, $10, $20, and $100 notes. The one-dollar note continued production in the Fourth Issue in 1981 until its removal alongside the two-dollar note in mid-1991 from the Fifth issue. The beginning of New Zealand's transition to a decimal system official started when the Decimal Currency Act was passed in 1964. Discussions on decimalisation started in the mid-1950s and a Decimal Coinage Committee was set up in May 1957.

== Design ==
The note design of the third issue and consequently the one-dollar note was influenced and consistent with the themes, iconography and ideals that formed Series 1 and Series 2 notes. Earlier round issues sourced its iconography and designs from the public self-image that saw a growing independence and identity of New Zealand as a separate entity from its historical identity as a colony of Britain. The design and features on the first Series 3 bank notes, including the one-dollar note, was led by a six-person design committee appointed in 1964 which included members Alexander McLintock, Stewart Bell Maclennan and Professor John Simpson. This self-identity translated into the design of the one-dollar note which featured Queen Elizabeth II on the obverse and a New Zealand fantail and Clematis paniculata flowers on the reverse. This ‘dual concept’ of national identity was also featured on the rest of other series 3 notes which typically included Queen Elizabeth II on the obverse and flora and/or fauna on the reverse. The engraving of Queen Elizabeth II used in the one-dollar note and other Series 3 notes was based on a 1960 photograph taken by Anthony Buckley.

The designs, icons and imagery was relatively consistent between Series 1 through to Series 4 which presented the 'dual concept' of national identity until Series 5 onwards which were to have "a uniquely New Zealand quality to the notes". This change which was a result of extensive public consultations also included criteria such as "developing notes that were visually rich and appealing to a wide cross-section of the community", "developing notes that reinforced positive aspects of the national identity", "having a bi-cultural perspective on the notes" and notes that were politically neutral. This resulted in the Queen only being present on the $20 note of the Series 4 issue.

== Features ==
The features of the New Zealand one-dollar note were limited compared to the current Series 7 banknotes. It featured a serial number on the top right corner and lower left quadrant of the obverse. Security and counterfeit measures were mainly limited to the printing processes involved and serial number identification. It featured significantly less security and anti-counterfeit features compared to the current series 7 notes in circulation. Series 7 anti-counterfeit measures such as the transparent window, metallic numbers, metallic imagery, and polymer embossing were features that were not included within the series 3 one-dollar notes. Series 3 one-dollar notes were also printed on cotton based-paper which limited the introduction of security features that were on Series 6 and Series 7 banknotes which were printed on polymer substrates.

== Removal from circulation ==
One-dollar and two-dollar bank notes were officially announced for replacement on 17 August 1988 by then Associated Finance Minister hon. Michael Cullen. This was estimated to take about 2 years after dimensions, metallic content and design were finalised. One of the primary bases for transitioning to metal coins was the expected life expectancy of the currency which approximated 20 years whilst costing approximately the same to produce. This would result in cost savings associated with printing and distribution of replacement bank notes which had a lower life expectancy of 6 to 7 months. In this change, 1 cent and 2-coins also ceased production as the cost of producing these bronze coins was greater than the face value of the coins themselves, being approximately 1.6 cents and 2.3 cents in cost to produce 1 cent and 2 cent coins respectively (see article "New Zealand one-cent coin").
