= New Zealand twenty-dollar note =

Current denomination of New Zealand currency

Twenty dollars
- Country: New Zealand
- Value: 20 NZD
- Width: 145 mm
- Height: 70 mm
- Material used: Polymer
- Years of printing: 1967–present

Obverse
- Design: Elizabeth II
- Design date: May 2016 (current seventh series)

Reverse
- Design: kārearea
- Design date: May 2016 (current seventh series)

The New Zealand twenty-dollar note is a New Zealand banknote. It is issued by the Reserve Bank of New Zealand and since 1999 has been a polymer banknote. It was first issued on 10 July 1967 when New Zealand decimalised its currency, changing from the New Zealand pound to the New Zealand dollar. It has an image of Queen Elizabeth II on the front.

== Design ==
There have been seven series of New Zealand banknotes. The first two series used the New Zealand pound, and the twenty-dollar note was introduced with the third series.

=== Third series (1967–1981) ===
Third series twenty dollar note (1967)

The first dollar notes were issued with the introduction of the New Zealand dollar on 10 July 1967, replacing their pound note predecessors at the rate of two dollars to the pound. They were made using cotton-based paper, and the twenty-dollar notes used the same green colour as the ten-pound note it replaced, to aid cash-handling during the transition. The design was selected by a six-person design committee appointed in 1964, which included Alexander McLintock, Stewart Bell Maclennan and Professor John Simpson, Dean of the Faculty of Fine Arts at the University of Canterbury.

All the notes of this series had Queen Elizabeth II on the front, and a watermark of Captain James Cook. They also had a New Zealand bird and the plant most closely associated with that species on the back. The back of the twenty-dollar note featured a kererū and a miro tree.

=== Fourth series (1982–1991) ===
In late 1981 the Reserve Bank switched to a New Zealand-based printer which meant that new printing plates had to be made. The only changes with this series were minor drawing changes, and a new portrait of Elizabeth II.

=== Fifth series (1992–1999) ===
Fifth series twenty dollar note (1992)

New Zealand's banknotes were completely re-designed in the 1990s, after another change of printer gave the Reserve Bank an opportunity to introduce uniquely New Zealand designs. The new twenty-dollar note still featured Queen Elizabeth II as the main portrait on the front, unlike the other New Zealand banknotes which now featured notable New Zealand figures. The New Zealand Parliament Buildings were featured next to the Queen, while the back of the note had a New Zealand alpine scene, containing a kārearea falcon, Marlborough rock daisy, flowering red tussock and Mount Tapuaenuku, the highest peak on the South Island's Inland Kaikoura range. The image of the Queen was from her official portrait taken in 1986. Another feature is the tukutuku patterning on the front, called "Poutama", taken from the Te-Hau-ki-Tūranga meeting house at Te Papa Museum.

=== Sixth series (1999–2016) ===
Sixth series twenty dollar note (1999)

In 1999, New Zealand changed from paper banknotes to polymer banknotes. The change increased the life of the banknotes and also allowed new and improved security features to prevent counterfeiting. The overall design of the notes remained unchanged albeit for slight modifications for the new security features.

=== Seventh series (2016–present) ===
A new twenty-dollar note was released in May 2016 along with the newly designed fifty-dollar and one-hundred dollar notes, as part of the Series 7 banknote release (described by the Reserve Bank as the "Brighter Money" series). The new five-dollar and ten-dollar notes had previously been released in October 2015.

The new series was introduced in order to add more security features to New Zealand banknotes. As surveys showed that the New Zealand public were generally content with the note design, very few design changes were made, and the design remains substantially the same as the Series 5 design. The note was brighter in colour and featured the Māori translation of Reserve Bank (Te Putea Matua), and "New Zealand, Aotearoa" on the back.

=== Future ===
After the death of Queen Elizabeth II in September 2022, the Reserve Bank said it would exhaust its existing stocks of twenty-dollar notes before introducing new twenty-dollar notes featuring King Charles III. Based on current stock levels, this would likely be several years away.

== Usage ==
The twenty-dollar note is the most common banknote in circulation in New Zealand. As of March 2020, an estimated 62.9m were in circulation in New Zealand, worth approx $1.26 billion.

== Security features ==
New Zealand's banknotes incorporate many security features to prevent counterfeiting. The newer polymer banknotes have a distinctive plastic feel and should not tear easily. The banknotes are printed by the Canadian Bank Note Company in Ottawa, Ontario, Canada.

Security features on the Series 7 twenty-dollar note include a large transparent window containing intricate details, such as the denomination of the note and a detailed border with ferns and koru patterns. When held up to the light, small puzzle pieces on the front and back of the note form a complete number 20 (the denomination of the note). The front and back of the banknote have raised ink that can be felt. On the front of the banknote, the large number 20, the portrait and the words "Reserve Bank of New Zealand Te Pūtea Matua" are raised; on the back, the large number 20, the featured bird and the words "New Zealand" and "Aotearoa" are raised.

The Series 6 security features include that, when the note is shown to the light, a shadow image of Elizabeth II is displayed. There is intaglio printing through the note which gives it an embossed feel. Under UV light a fluorescent patch will appear showing "20", the denomination of the note. The note has a see-through window in the shape of fern on the left and an oval-shaped window on the right. There is an image of a fern located above the see-through window, and the two sides should match perfectly when held up to the light.
