= New Zealand five-dollar note =

Current denomination of New Zealand currency

Five dollars
- Country: New Zealand
- Value: 5 NZD
- Width: 135 mm
- Height: 69 mm
- Material used: Polymer
- Years of printing: 1967–present

Obverse
- Design: Sir Edmund Hillary
- Design date: 1992 (original design); October 2015 (current design)

Reverse
- Design: Hoiho, Campbell Island
- Design date: 1992 (original design); October 2015 (current design)

The New Zealand five-dollar note is a New Zealand banknote. It is issued by the Reserve Bank of New Zealand and since 1999 has been a polymer banknote. It was first issued on 10 July 1967 when New Zealand decimalised its currency, changing from the New Zealand pound to the New Zealand dollar. The note originally had an image of Queen Elizabeth II on the front; since 1992 it has had an image of Sir Edmund Hillary. The new design released in October 2015 was named "Banknote of the Year" by the International Bank Note Society for 2015.

== Design ==
There have been seven series of New Zealand banknotes. The first two series used the New Zealand pound, and the five-dollar note was introduced with the third series.

=== Third series (1967–1981) ===
The first dollar notes were issued with the introduction of the New Zealand dollar on 10 July 1967. They replaced their pound note predecessors at the rate of two dollars to the pound, except the five-dollar note, which was a new denomination, equivalent to £2 10s. The notes were made using cotton-based paper, and the five-dollar notes used an orange colour not used by any of the pound denominations from the second series. The design was selected by a six-person design committee appointed in 1964, which included Alexander McLintock, Stewart Bell Maclennan and Professor John Simpson, Dean of the Faculty of Fine Arts at the University of Canterbury.

All the notes of this series had Queen Elizabeth II on the front, and a watermark of Captain James Cook. They also had a New Zealand bird and the plant most closely associated with that species on the back. The five-dollar note featured a tūī perched on a kōwhai tree.

=== Fourth series (1982–1991) ===
In late 1981 the Reserve Bank switched to a different printer which meant that new printing plates had to be made. The only changes with this series were minor drawing changes and a new portrait of Elizabeth II.

=== Fifth series (1992–1999) ===
New Zealand's banknotes were completely re-designed in the 1990s to introduce uniquely New Zealand designs. The $1 and $2 notes were removed from circulation, and replaced with coins. The explorer Sir Edmund Hillary was depicted on the front of the five-dollar note, with Aoraki / Mount Cook, the tallest mountain in New Zealand at 12,316 feet (3,754 m), shown on the left hand side. Hillary was one of the first two individuals known to have reached the summit of Mount Everest, and the first to have been to the South Pole, the North Pole and the summit of Everest. One of the Ferguson tractors driven by Hillary to the pole could be seen in the lower left corner, next to the fern motif. Hillary is the only living person, other than monarchs, to appear on a New Zealand banknote during his lifetime.

The back of the note featured a scene from Campbell Island which is south of Stewart Island / Rakiura. The penguin shown on the note is the hoiho (yellow-eyed penguin), which is native to New Zealand. Bulbinella rossii, commonly known as the Ross lily, with its yellow flower heads, was also featured. The Queen featured on a watermark. The design also featured a tukutuku pattern known as kaokao that is found at the Tane-Nui-A-Rangi meeting house at Waipapa Marae at the University of Auckland.

=== Sixth series (1999–2015) ===
In 1999, New Zealand changed from paper banknotes to polymer banknotes. The change increased the life of the banknotes and also allowed new and improved security features to prevent counterfeiting. The overall design of the notes remained unchanged albeit for slight modifications for the new security features.

=== Seventh series (2015–present) ===
New five-dollar and ten-dollar banknotes were released in October 2015 as part of the Series 7 banknote release (described by the Reserve Bank as the "Brighter Money" series). The remaining three banknote denominations ($20, $50, $100) in Series 7 were released in May 2016.

The new series was introduced in order to add more security features to New Zealand banknotes. As surveys showed that the New Zealand public were generally content with the note design, very few design changes were made, and the design remains substantially the same as the Series 5 design. The note was brighter in colour and featured the Māori translation of Reserve Bank (Te Putea Matua), and "New Zealand, Aotearoa" on the back. One notable change in relation to the five-dollar note design was that Hillary's tractor was removed, in order to allow room for security features.

The note was named "Banknote of the Year" by the International Bank Note Society for 2015. Of the nearly 150 new banknotes released that year, nearly 40 were eligible for the award. The society said: "Printed by the Canadian Bank Note Company in Ottawa, each stunning orange and brown $5 note displays a map of New Zealand in a gorgeous polymer window as well as numerous upgraded security features." Geoff Bascand, the Deputy Governor of the Reserve Bank, said the award was "testament to the hard work and innovation by the Bank and its partners that has gone into developing the note."

== Security features ==
New Zealand's banknotes incorporate many security features to prevent counterfeiting. The newer polymer banknotes have a distinctive plastic feel and should not tear easily.

Security features on the Series 7 five-dollar note include a large transparent window containing intricate details, such as the denomination of the note and a detailed border with ferns and koru patterns. When held up to the light, small puzzle pieces on the front and back of the note form a complete number 5 (the denomination of the note). The front and back of the banknote have raised ink that can be felt. On the front of the banknote, the large number 5, the portrait and the words "Reserve Bank of New Zealand Te Pūtea Matua" are raised; on the back, the large number 5, the featured bird and the words "New Zealand" and "Aotearoa" are raised.

The Series 6 security features include that, when the note is shown to the light, a shadow image of Elizabeth II is displayed. There is intaglio printing through the note which gives it an embossed feel. Under UV light a fluorescent patch will appear showing "5", the denomination of the note. The note has a see-through window in the shape of fern on the left and an oval-shaped window on the right. There is an image of a fern located above the see-through window, and the two sides should match perfectly when held up to the light.
