= An Encyclopaedia of New Zealand =

Official encyclopaedia about New Zealand

- Dust jacket front cover
- Editor: A. H. McLintock
- Language: English
- Subject: New Zealand
- Genre: Encyclopedia
- Publisher: R. E. Owen, Government Printer
- Publication date: November 1966
- Publication place: New Zealand
- Media type: 3 volumes, hardbound; republished online
- OCLC: 1014037525
- Dewey Decimal: 993.003
- LC Class: DU405 .E5
- Text: An Encyclopaedia of New Zealand online

An Encyclopaedia of New Zealand is an official encyclopaedia about New Zealand, published in three volumes by the New Zealand Government in 1966. Edited by Alexander Hare McLintock, the parliamentary historian, assisted by two others, it contained over 1,800 articles and 900 biographies, written by 359 contributing authors. The Government commissioned the encyclopaedia in 1959 and McLintock started work on it in mid-1960. The three volumes have 928, 894, and 848 pages, respectively.

The encyclopaedia is more comprehensive, and more representative of minorities, than previous New Zealand reference works, such as the vanity press The Cyclopedia of New Zealand published around sixty years earlier, but not as representative as the later Dictionary of New Zealand Biography. Some women were included as representing firsts, including Kate Edger.

Its publication in November 1966 met with an enthusiastic response. The Press in Christchurch wrote a detailed review, commending McLintock on his achievement, quibbling about a few errors, and expressing a wish that adequate budgets be provided for revised editions. Within two months, almost all of its initial print run of 34,000 copies had sold. After the last 3,000 copies sold, it was never reprinted, more due to the non-commercial priorities of the government-run printing office than any lack of demand or interest from the public. The encyclopaedia was well received by scholars and teachers, and is still regarded as an important New Zealand reference work, even considering its errors and omissions, and the biases of its time. Jock Phillips, writing in 2003 about his editorship of its successor Te Ara: The Encyclopedia of New Zealand, considers it an "illustrious predecessor" and describes it as

even now, a most impressive work. It remains an essential source of reference for students and scholars of New Zealand [...] But it is very much a creature of a particular time and place.

The work's importance, both as a reference and as an historical snapshot of mid-20th century New Zealand, motivated the Ministry for Culture and Heritage to digitise and republish the work online. The text and images are available, without corrections or updates, as a separate resource within Te Ara: The Encyclopedia of New Zealand.
