= New Zealand two-dollar note =

Former denomination of New Zealand currency

Two dollars
(New Zealand)
- Value: 2 New Zealand dollars
- Material used: Cotton-based paper
- Years of printing: 1967–1991

Obverse
- Design: Queen Elizabeth II
- Design date: 1967, updated portrait 1981

Reverse
- Design: Rifleman and mistletoe flowers
- Design date: 1967

The New Zealand two-dollar note was a banknote of the New Zealand dollar in circulation from 1967 until 1991.

The note introduced on 10 July 1967, replacing the £1 note. In 1981, the fourth series of banknotes were released with minor drawing changes and a portrait update of Queen Elizabeth II on the obverse. The note was withdrawn from circulation along with the one-dollar note in 1991, replaced by the one- and two-dollar coins released the previous year.

The two-dollar note featured Queen Elizabeth II on the obverse, and New Zealand native species on the reverse: the rifleman bird (Acanthisitta chloris, (Māori: titipounamu), and flowers of red mistletoe (Peraxilla tetrapetala, Māori: roeroe).
