= New Zealand ten-dollar note =

Current denomination of New Zealand currency

Ten dollars
- Country: New Zealand
- Value: 10 NZD
- Width: 140 mm
- Height: 68 mm
- Material used: Polymer (1999–present)
- Years of printing: 1967–present

Obverse
- Design: Kate Sheppard
- Design date: 1992 (original design); October 2015 (current design)

Reverse
- Design: Whio, River Scene
- Design date: 1992 (original design); October 2015 (current design)

The New Zealand ten-dollar note is a New Zealand banknote issued by the Reserve Bank of New Zealand. It was first issued on 10 July 1967 when New Zealand decimalised its currency, changing from the New Zealand pound to the New Zealand dollar. All New Zealand dollar notes had a portrait of Queen Elizabeth II on the front, but since 1991 the ten-dollar note was changed to the suffragist Kate Sheppard. Originally issued using cotton paper, since 1999 it has been a polymer banknote.

== Design ==
There have been seven series of New Zealand banknotes. The first two series used the New Zealand pound, and the ten-dollar note was introduced with the third series.

=== Third series (1967–1981) ===
The first dollar notes were issued with the introduction of the New Zealand dollar on 10 July 1967, replacing their pound note predecessors at the rate of two dollars to the pound. They were made using cotton-based paper, and the ten-dollar notes used the same blue colour as the five-pound note it replaced, to aid cash-handling during the transition. The design was selected by a six-person design committee appointed in 1964, which included Alexander McLintock, Stewart Bell Maclennan and Professor John Simpson, Dean of the Faculty of Fine Arts at the University of Canterbury.

All the notes of this series had Queen Elizabeth II on the front, and a watermark of Captain James Cook. They also had a New Zealand bird and the plant most closely associated with that species on the back. The ten-dollar note had a blue background. On the back was a kea (a New Zealand parrot). The kea was perched on a mountain lily, which had large waxy flowers.

=== Fourth series (1982–1993) ===
In late 1981 the Reserve Bank switched to a different printer which meant that new printing plates had to be made. The only changes with this series were minor drawing changes and a new portrait of Elizabeth II.

=== Fifth series (1993–1999) ===
New Zealand's banknotes were completely re-designed in the 1990s to introduce uniquely New Zealand designs. Kate Sheppard, the most famous New Zealand suffragist, was now on the front of the ten-dollar note, next to a white camellia, a symbol for universal suffrage in New Zealand. A whio, an endangered species of New Zealand bird, was on the back. Between the portrait and the camellia was a map of New Zealand. The note had a light blue background with ferns. Another feature was the tukutuku patterning on the front, taken from the Te Hau ki Tūranga meeting house at Te Papa Museum.

The ten-dollar note was released in 1993 to mark the centennial of women getting the vote in New Zealand in 1893.

=== Sixth series (1999–2015) ===
In 1999, New Zealand changed from paper banknotes to polymer banknotes. The change increased the life of the banknotes and also allowed new and improved security features to prevent counterfeiting. The overall design of the notes remained unchanged albeit for slight modifications for the new security features.

=== Seventh series (2015–present) ===
A new ten-dollar note was released in October 2015 along with the newly designed five-dollar note, as part of the Series 7 banknote release (described by the Reserve Bank as the "Brighter Money" series). The remaining three banknote denominations ($20, $50, $100) in Series 7 were released in May 2016.

The new series was introduced in order to add more security features to New Zealand banknotes. As surveys showed that the New Zealand public were generally content with the note design, very few design changes were made, and the design remains substantially the same as the Series 5 design. The note was brighter in colour and featured the Māori translation of Reserve Bank (Te Putea Matua), and "New Zealand, Aotearoa" on the back.

The new five-dollar and ten-dollar notes filtered out slowly because the new notes were only issued as returned older notes came in. Polymer banknotes last four times as long as cotton banknotes, and many notes from the sixth series can still be found in circulation. As of August 2019, less than half of the $5 and $10 in circulation are these new type, with the sixth series notes still dominating.

== Security features ==
New Zealand's banknotes incorporate many security features to prevent counterfeiting. The newer polymer banknotes have a distinctive plastic feel and should not tear easily.

Security features on the Series 7 ten-dollar note include a large transparent window containing intricate details, such as the denomination of the note and a detailed border with ferns and koru patterns. When held up to the light, small puzzle pieces on the front and back of the note form a complete number 10 (the denomination of the note). The front and back of the banknote have raised ink that can be felt. On the front of the banknote, the large number 10, the portrait and the words "Reserve Bank of New Zealand Te Pūtea Matua" are raised; on the back, the large number 10, the featured bird and the words "New Zealand" and "Aotearoa" are raised.

The Series 6 security features include that, when the note is shown to the light, a shadow image of Elizabeth II is displayed. There is intaglio printing through the note which gives it an embossed feel. Under UV light a fluorescent patch will appear showing "10", the denomination of the note. The note has a see-through window in the shape of fern on the left and an oval-shaped window on the right. There is an image of a fern located above the see-through window, and the two sides should match perfectly when held up to the light.

== Commemorative editions ==
=== 1990 commemorative banknote ===
The Reserve Bank issued a special edition of the ten-dollar note in 1990 to commemorate 150 years since the signing of the Treaty of Waitangi in 1840. The front of the note was largely the same as the standard note, but to the right of the portrait of Queen Elizabeth II is a red circle with a kōtuku (white heron) with the year "1990" underneath the circle. This was the logo of the 1990 Commission which organised the commemorative celebrations. The back of the note shows the Treaty being signed. To the right, the note reads "New Zealand 1990 commemorating the signing of the Treaty of Waitangi 1840". The note is made of cotton and uses dark and light blue colours.

=== 1999–2000 polymer banknote millennium ===
New Zealand Millennium $10 note

Obverse: Māori waka, inscribed THE DAWN OF A NEW ERA LIGHTS THE WAY FOR NEW ZEALAND'S PERPETUAL VOYAGE OF INNOVATION AND DISCOVERY

Reverse: inscribed CELEBRATING NEW ZEALAND'S FREE SPIRIT & QUEST FOR ADVENTURE IN THE NEW MILLENNIUM

Issued: 1999

The Reserve Bank issued another special edition of the note in 1999 to celebrate the new millennium in New Zealand. Unlike the standard ten-dollar note, it does not feature a portrait. It depicts instead a Māori waka on the front and the words, "The dawn of a new era lights the way for New Zealand's perpetual voyage of innovation and discovery". On the back, it includes images of surfers, sky-divers, canoes and a mountain skier, along with the words "Celebrating New Zealand's free spirit & quest for adventure in the new millennium". It featured blue and purple colours with some yellow, and folding the note while looking through the transparent window reveals "Y2K". Over three million of these notes were issued into general circulation, and the Reserve Bank began withdrawing them in 2002. They are now collector's items and as of 2020 can sell for as much as NZ$88.
