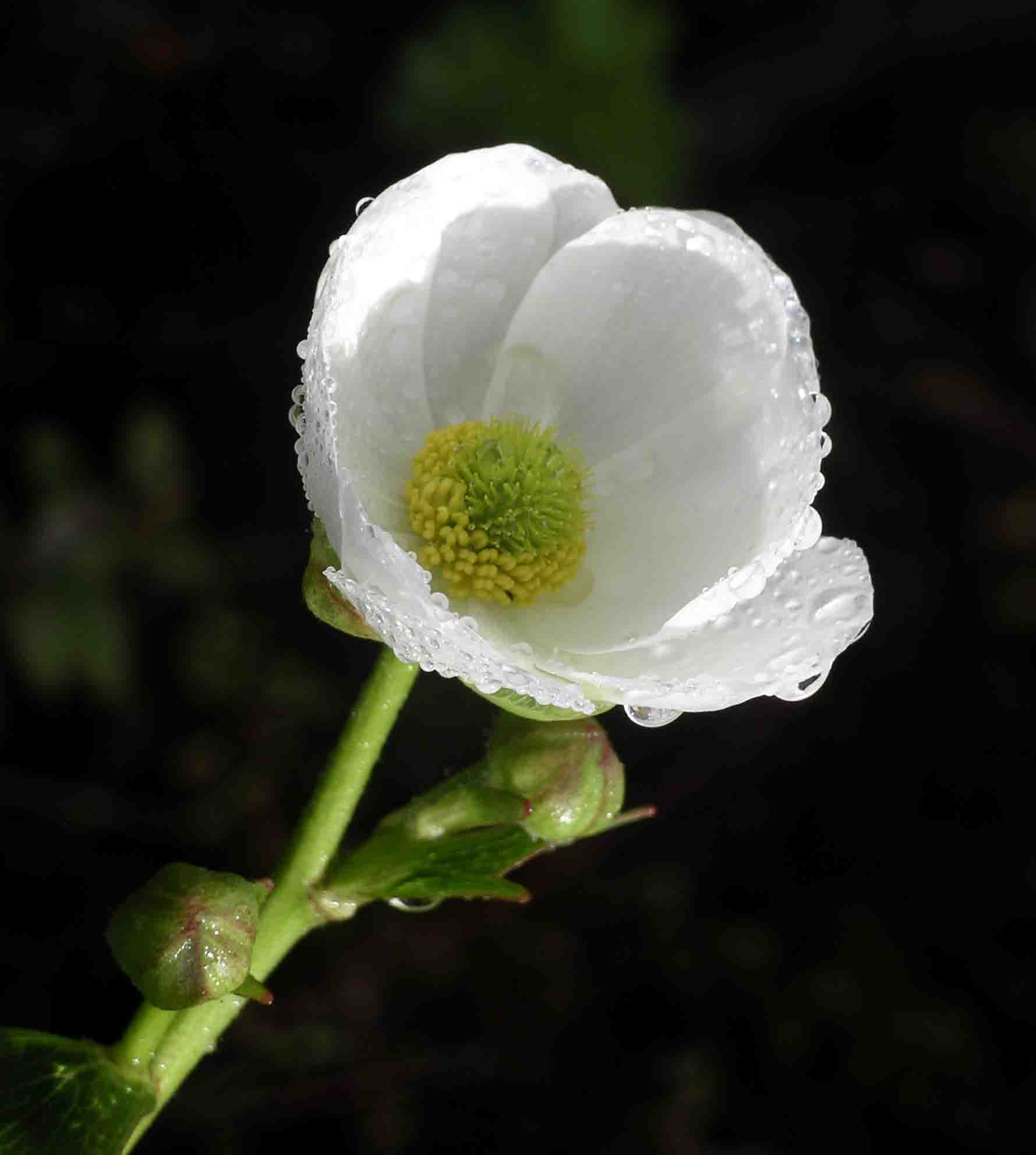

Scientific classification
- Kingdom: Plantae
- Clade: Embryophytes
- Clade: Tracheophytes
- Clade: Spermatophytes
- Clade: Angiosperms
- Clade: Eudicots
- Order: Ranunculales
- Family: Ranunculaceae
- Genus: Ranunculus
- Species: R. lyallii

Binomial name
- Ranunculus lyallii Hook.f.

= Ranunculus lyallii =

Species of buttercup endemic to New Zealand

Ranunculus lyallii (Mountain buttercup, Mount Cook buttercup, or, although not a lily, Mount Cook lily), is a species of Ranunculus (buttercup), endemic to New Zealand, where it occurs in the South Island and on Rakiura Stewart Island at altitudes of 700–1,500 m. R. lyallii is the largest species in the genus Ranunculus, growing over a metre in height.

The species was discovered by David Lyall, (1817–1895), a noted Scottish botanist and doctor. Contemporary botanist Sir Joseph Hooker, (1817–1911), noted in his Flora Antarctica:

Among his many important botanical discoveries in this survey was that of the monarch of all buttercups, the gigantic white-flowered Ranunculus lyallii, the only known species with peltate leaves, the 'water-lily' of the New Zealand shepherds.--Joseph Dalton Hooker (1895) 33 Journal of Botany, p. 209.

It is a herbaceous perennial plant growing to 60–100 cm tall (the largest species of buttercup), with a stout rhizome. The leaves are glossy dark green, peltate, 15–40 cm diameter. The flowers are 5–8 cm diameter, with 10–20 white petals and numerous yellow stamens; flowering is from late spring to early summer.

Notable sites for the species include Aoraki / Mount Cook National Park and in other alpine areas of including the area around Arthur's Pass.

The flower (termed Mount Cook lily in this usage) was the logo of Mount Cook Airline until replaced by Air New Zealand's koru symbol. Other companies connected with the airline used the same logo until the Mount Cook Group was disbanded in 1989. The iconic flower has featured on New Zealand Post stamps as early as 1936 and repeatedly in later decades as part of sets relating to conservation and scenery.

== Gallery ==
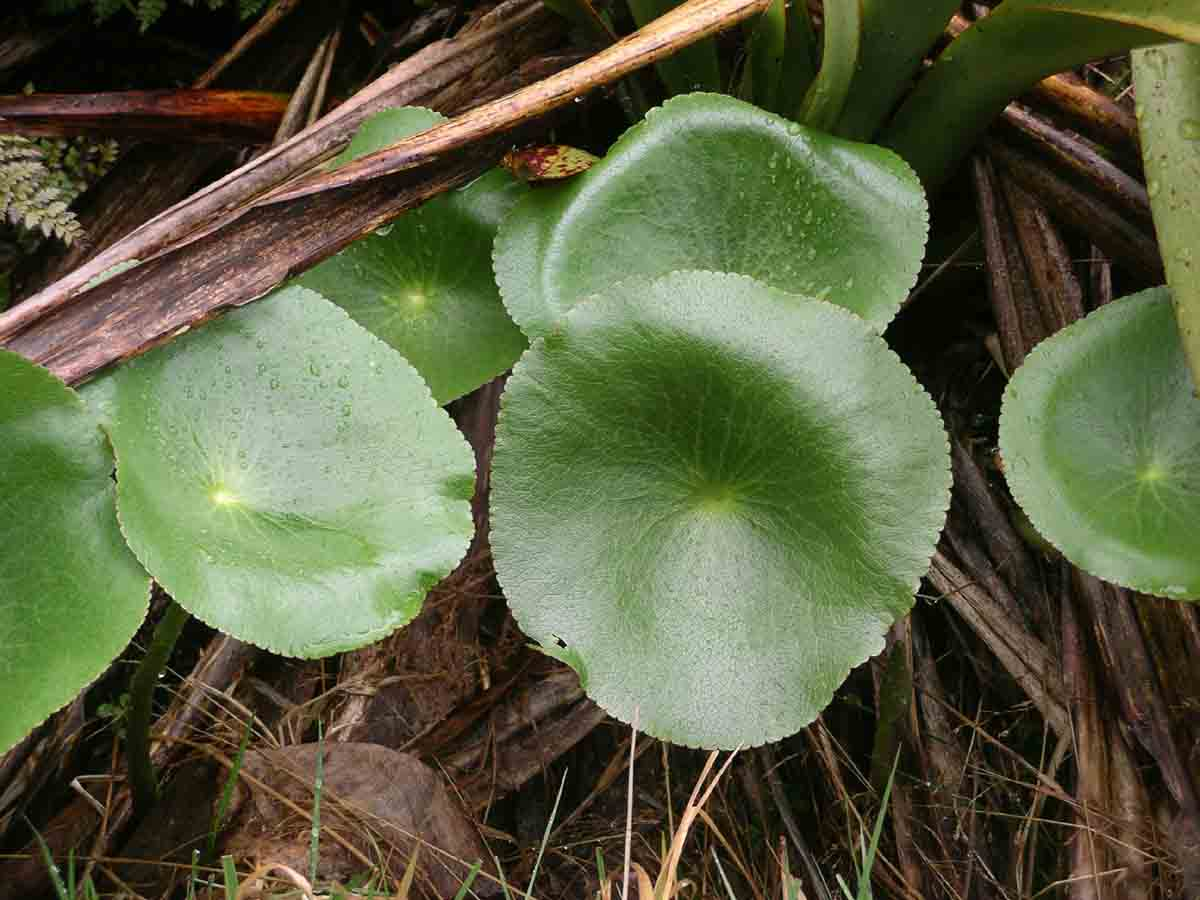
Foliage

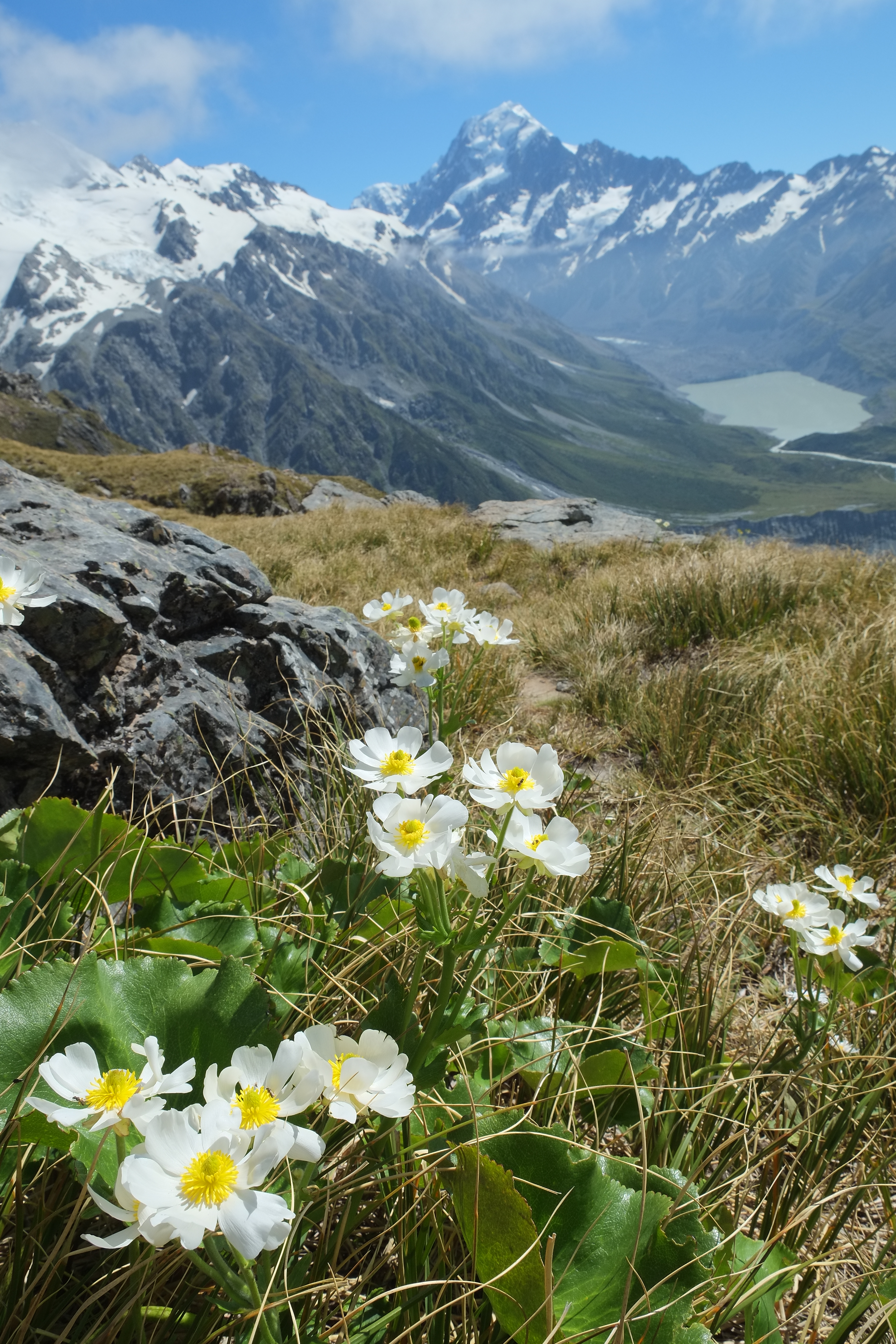
Plants growing in alpine scrub in Aoraki / Mount Cook National Park

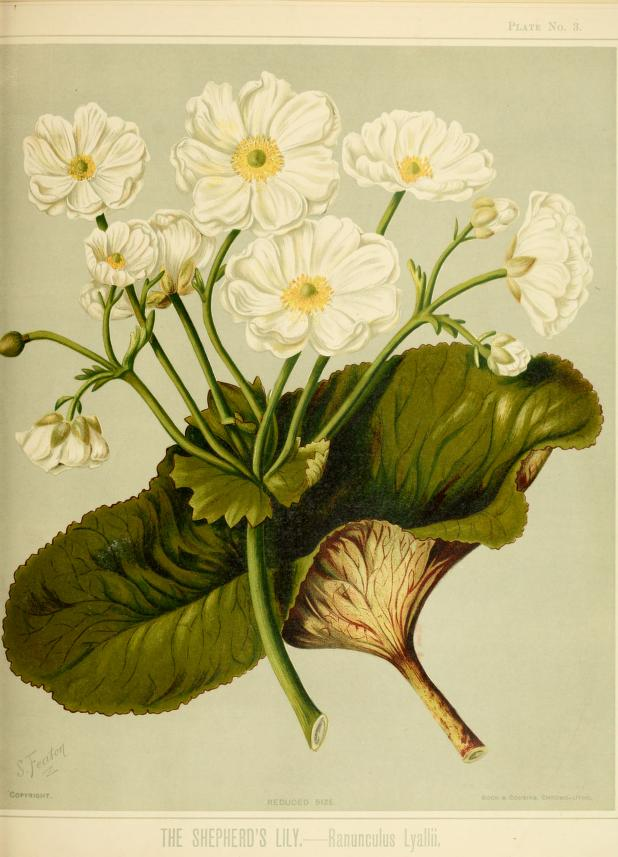
Illustration by Sarah Featon

== Sources ==
Lyall, Andrew; "David Lyall (1817–1895): Botanical explorer of Antarctica, New Zealand, the Arctic and North America" (2010) 26:2 The Linnean pp. 23–48, Linnean Society of London (July 2010).
