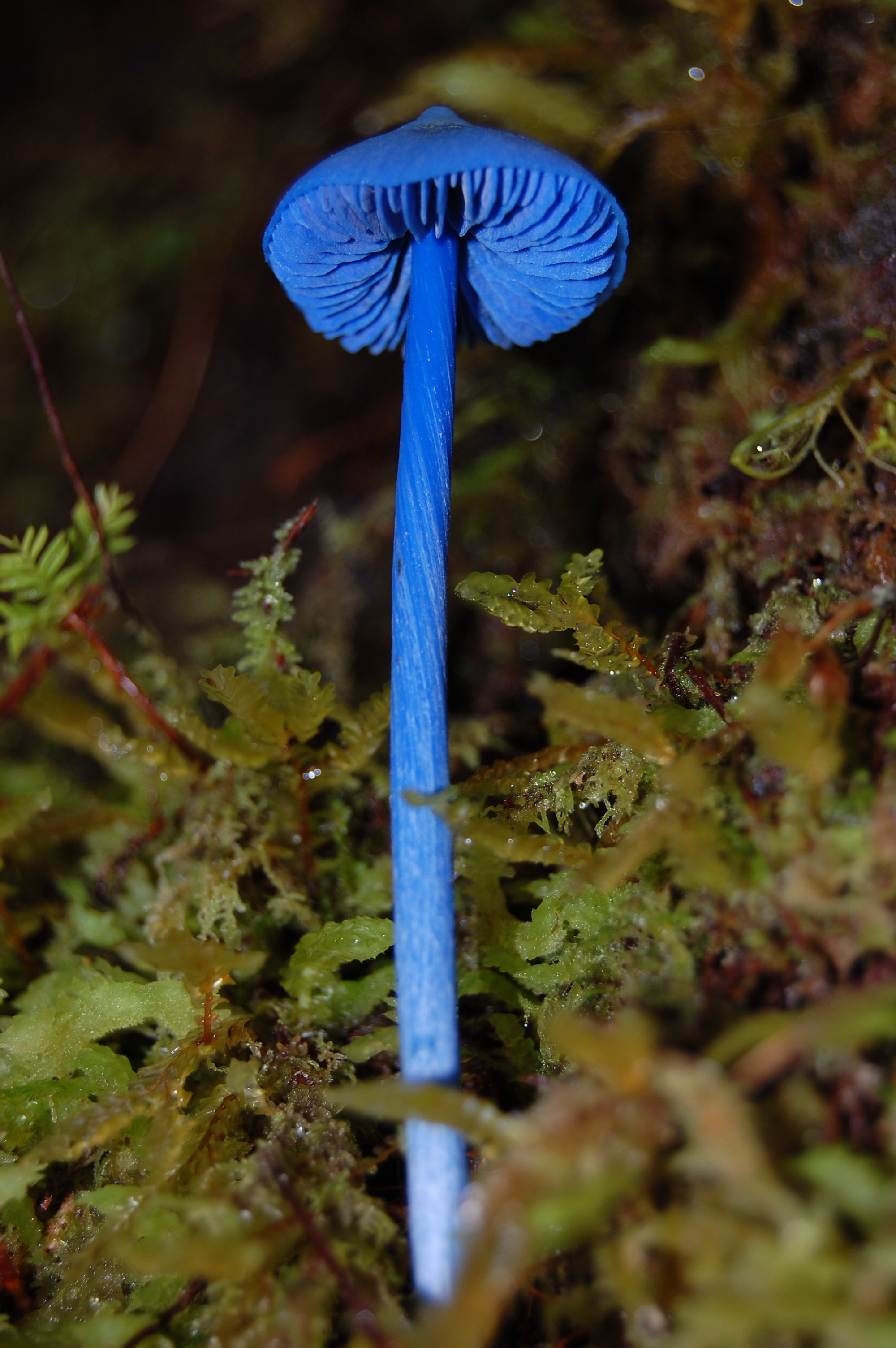

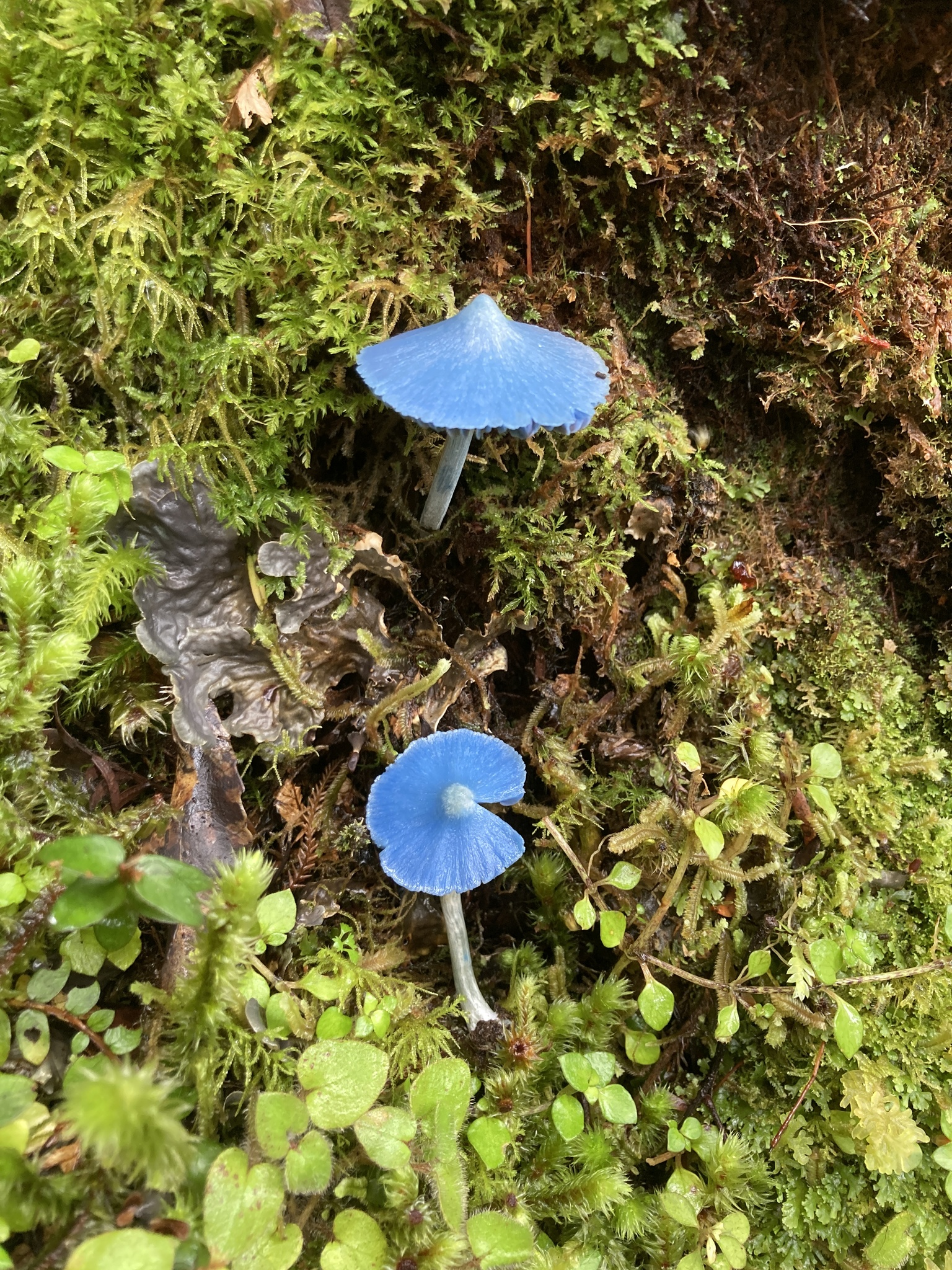

Scientific classification
- Kingdom: Fungi
- Division: Basidiomycota
- Class: Agaricomycetes
- Order: Agaricales
- Family: Entolomataceae
- Genus: Entoloma
- Species: E. hochstetteri

Binomial name
- Entoloma hochstetteri (Reich.) G.Stev.

= Entoloma hochstetteri =

Species of fungus endemic to New Zealand

Entoloma hochstetteri
- Mycological characteristics
- Gills on hymenium
- Cap is convex
- Hymenium is adnate
- Stipe is bare
- Spore print is pink
- Ecology is saprotrophic
- Edibility is unknown

Entoloma hochstetteri, also known as the blue pinkgill, sky-blue mushroom or similar names, is a species of mushroom that is native to New Zealand. The small mushroom is a distinctive all-blue colour, while the gills have a slight reddish tint from the spores. The blue colouring of the fruit body is due to azulene pigments. Whether Entoloma hochstetteri is poisonous or not is unknown.

This species was one of six native fungi featured in a set of fungal stamps issued in New Zealand in 2002. It is also featured on the New Zealand fifty-dollar note. With E. hochstetteri's inclusion, this makes it the only banknote in the world which features a mushroom on it. In a 2018 poll, E. hochstetteri was ranked first by Manaaki Whenua – Landcare Research for its pick as New Zealand's national fungus.

== Naming ==
The Māori name for the mushroom is werewere-kōkako, because its colour is similar to the blue wattle of the kōkako bird.

== Taxonomy ==
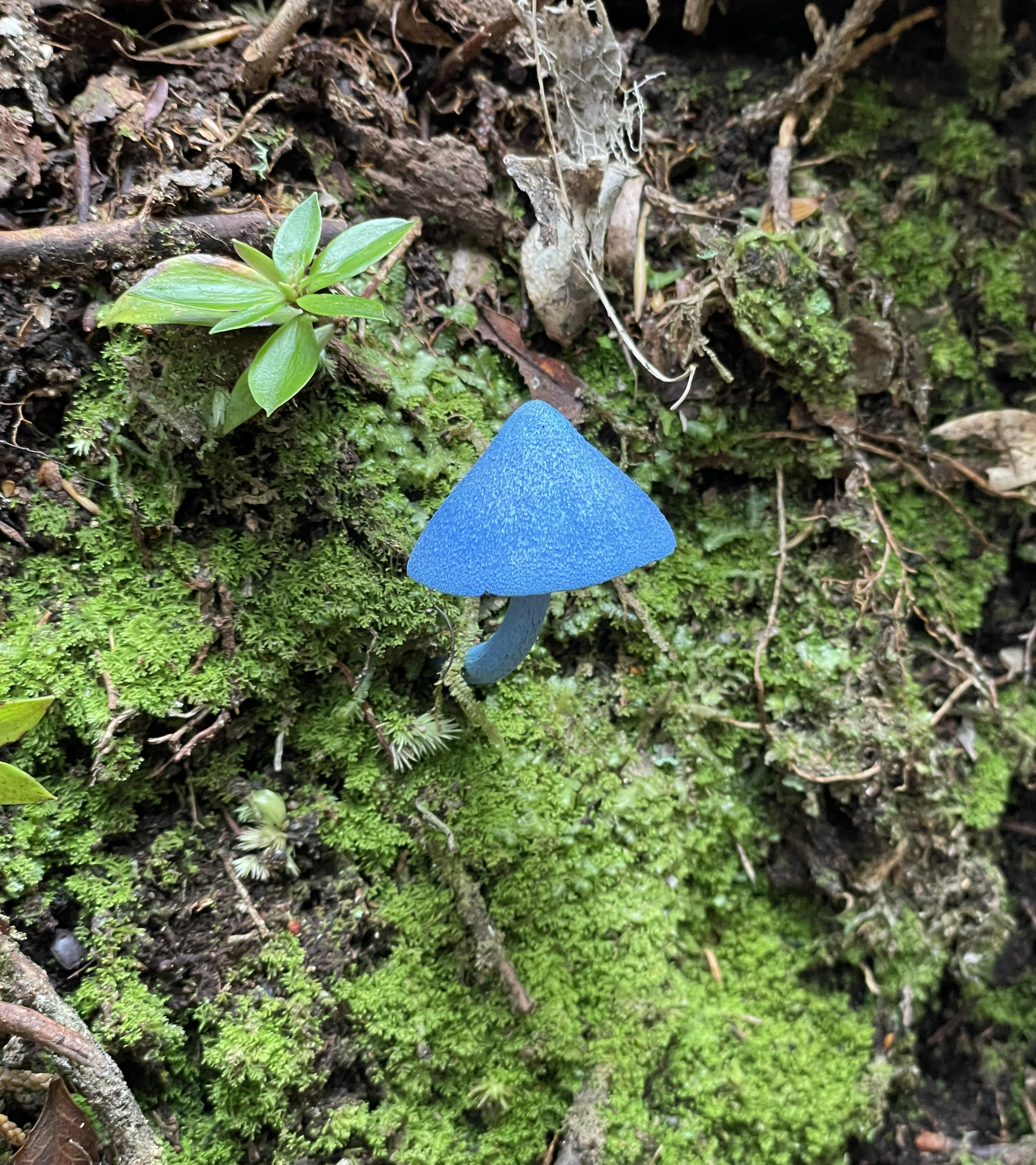
Entoloma hochstetteri near Coromandel, New Zealand

The species was first described as Cortinarius hochstetteri in 1866 by the Austrian mycologist Erwin Reichardt, before being given its current binomial in 1962 by Greta Stevenson. It is named after the German-Austrian naturalist Ferdinand von Hochstetter.

In 1976 Egon Horak combined Entoloma hochstetteri and Entoloma aeruginosum from Japan with Entoloma virescens (ja:ソライロタケ), first described from the Bonin Islands in Japan. In 1989 S. Dhancholia recorded E. hochstetteri in India. In 1990 Tsuguo Hongo from Japan examined E. hochstetteri and E. aeruginosum and concluded that they were different taxa, because of difference in the size of the spores and the shape of the pseudocystidia. In 2008 Horak recognised E. hochstetteri as a different species from E. virescens, while noting that "it is open to speculation" whether taxa such as E. virescens are the same species.

A similar mushroom is found in Australia and mycologists differ as to whether it is E. hochstetteri, E. virescens or a separate species.

== Description ==
Entoloma hochstetteri has a small delicate epigeous (above-ground) fruit body (basidiocarp). The cap may be up to 4 cm (1.4 in) in diameter and conical in shape. The cap colour is indigo-blue with a green tint, and is fibrillose. The cap margin is striate and rolled inwards. The gill attachment is adnexed or emarginate, gills are thin and 3–5 mm wide, essentially the same colour as the cap, sometimes with a yellow tint. The cylindrical stipe (stalk) is up to 5 cm (2 in) long by 0.5 cm thick, fibrillose and stuffed. The spore print is reddish-pink. The spores are 9.9–13.2 by 11.8–13.2 μm, tetrahedric in shape, hyaline, smooth and thin-walled. The basidia are 35.2–44.2 by 8.8–13.2 μm, club-shaped, hyaline, and with two or four sterigmata.

== Mythology ==
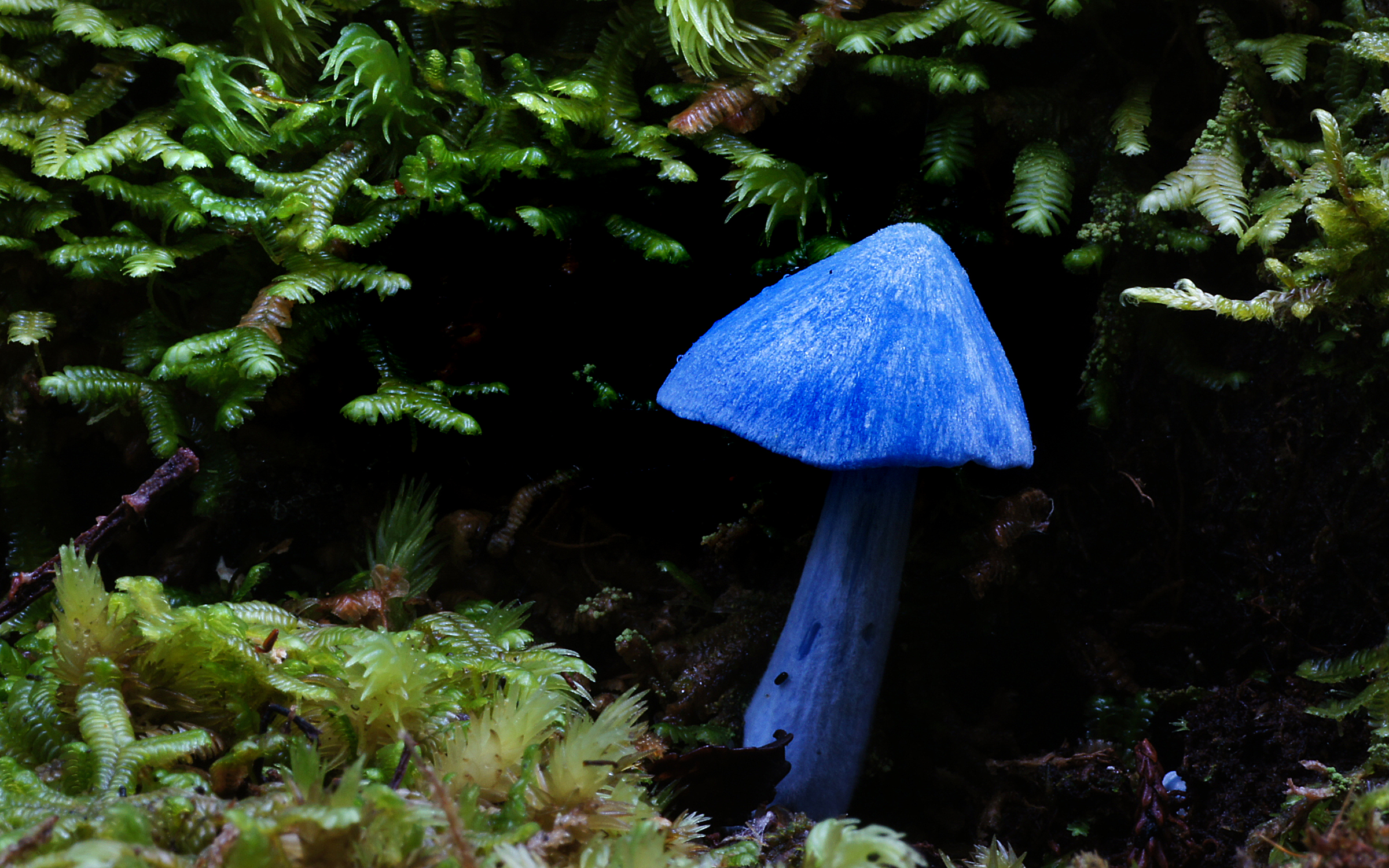
The distinctive Entoloma hochstetteri is part of Māori folklore

The Ngāi Tūhoe describe that the kōkako bird (Callaeas wilsoni) got its blue wattles from it rubbing its cheek against the mushroom, thus giving the mushroom the name werewere-kōkako.

== Habitat and distribution ==
Entoloma hochstetteri is common in forests throughout New Zealand, where it grows on soil among litter in broadleaf/podocarp forest. It fruits in January to July.

It was also reported from India in 1989 and from Australia, though it is unclear whether these are the same species or whether E. hochstetteri is endemic to New Zealand.

Attempts of lab cultivation of Entoloma hochstetteri have been made, to no avail.

== Toxicity ==
Although many members of the genus Entoloma are poisonous, the toxicity of this species is unknown. It is being investigated to see if its gene cluster that is responsible for blue colouring might be used to manufacture a natural blue food dye.

== See also ==
- List of Entoloma species
