= New Zealand two-dollar coin =

Denomination of the New Zealand dollar

Two dollars
- New Zealand
- Value: 2.00 New Zealand dollars
- Mass: 10.00 g
- Diameter: 26.50 mm
- Thickness: 2.70 mm
- Edge: Security
- Composition: Copper-aluminium-nickel (Cu 92%, Al 6%, Ni 2%)
- Years of minting: 1990 – present
- Catalog number: –

Obverse
- Design: Elizabeth II, Queen of New Zealand
- Designer: Raphael David Maklouf; Ian Rank-Broadley
- Design date: 1986 (RDM); 1999 (IRB)

Reverse
- Design: An eastern great egret or kōtuku (Ardea alba modesta)
- Design date: 1990

The New Zealand two-dollar coin is the largest-denomination coin of the New Zealand dollar. It was introduced along with the one-dollar coin in 1990 . Both are made from an alloy of aluminium and brass. It is the largest and heaviest coin in circulation, weighing ten grams and measuring 26.5 millimetres in diameter. Its thickness is 2.7 mm, only 0.04 mm thinner than the one-dollar coin, thus it is the second-thickest coin in the country's circulation. Both the $1 and $2 coins are gold-coloured, and requests for a Koha, donation or entry fee sometimes say gold coin please.

== History ==
A two dollar banknote was used in New Zealand from the start of the dollar in 1967 until 1991 when the coins became widely circulated.

The original ideas to produce one- and two-dollar coins were proposed in 1986 because of ongoing inflation which had lowered the value of the dollar and would cause the demonetisation of the one and two cent coins in 1988. From its first year until 1998 the coin featured on its obverse the portrait of Queen Elizabeth II by the British-Palestinian sculptor Raphael Maklouf. It had the text ELIZABETH II on the left of the portrait, NEW ZEALAND on the right and the date at the bottom.

The effigy was replaced in 1999 with a portrait by Ian Rank-Broadley, which had been introduced to the coins of the pound sterling in 1998. It reversed the position of the writing, moving the Queen's name to the right and the country's name to the left.

The reverse features a white heron, eastern great egret (Ardea alba modesta) (Maori: kotuku). Sacred to New Zealand's Māori people, and highly endangered within the country, the white heron is occasionally seen in feeding grounds throughout NZ but only breeds in Whataroa, South Westland, in the Waitangiroto Nature Reserve near the Okarito Lagoon where it feeds.

This continues the theme of birds among the dollar coins; the one-dollar coin has a kiwi, unique to New Zealand, on its reverse. The edge is fully milled, unique amongst New Zealand's current currency.

The 1997 New Zealand $2 coin was recalled quickly and destroyed due to an error that resulted in vending machines and parking meters rejecting them. This was due to the metal composition of the coin being slightly different to previous years, meaning that the conductivity of the 1997 coin was irregular. As most coin mechanisms use conductivity to verify a coin, this discrepancy resulted in widespread rejection of the coin.

== Minting figures ==
Year	Mintings
1990	30,000,000
1991	10,000,000
1997	1,000,000
1998	6,000,000
1999	5,050,000
2001	3,000,000
2002	6,000,000
2003	6,000,000
2005	5,000,000
2008	8,000,000
2011	8,000,000
2014	7,000,000
2015	3,000,000
2016	3,000,000
2019	12,200,000
2020	5,900,000
2022	8,000,000
Total	127,150,000

Total value: $254,300,000.

== Future ==
After the death of Queen Elizabeth II in September 2022, the Reserve Bank said it would exhaust its existing coin stocks before introducing new coins featuring King Charles III. Based on current stock levels, this would likely be several years away.
