= Alexander Hare McLintock =

New Zealand teacher, university lecturer, historian, artist (1903–1968)

Alexander Hare McLintock CBE
- Born: 14 April 1903; Gore, New Zealand
- Died: 29 May 1968 (aged 65); Dunedin, New Zealand

Academic background
- Education: University of Otago; University of London

Academic work
- Discipline: History

Alexander Hare McLintock CBE (14 April 1903 – 29 May 1968) was a New Zealand teacher, university lecturer, historian and artist. He edited and authored the three-volume Encyclopaedia of New Zealand, published in 1966, his final and perhaps his most remembered work.

== Early life ==
Born in Gore, New Zealand, on 14 April 1903, Alexander Hare McLintock was the son of a Scotsman, Robert McLintock, an engineer by trade, and his wife Christina née McDonald. He attended Caversham School in Dunedin and then Otago Boys' High School. After completing his education, he decided to become a teacher and went to Dunedin Teachers' Training College. He then worked for several years at a primary school while studying history at the University of Otago.

== Academia ==
McLintock became well known as a debater while at the University of Otago, representing the university at competitions overseas. He became a proficient speed reader and developed wide interests, including classics and the piano. As well as attending university, he went to the Dunedin School of Art and studied painting and etching. McLintock graduated in 1928 having obtained a master's degree with first class honours. The same year, he married Eva Maude née Adams.

McLintock was a teacher at Timaru Technical College from 1929 to 1936. He also lectured at the Workers' Educational Association in Timaru for a time. He went to the University of London in 1936, where he began studying for a Doctor of Philosophy degree. He completed his degree in 1939 and two years later, published The Establishment of Constitutional Government in Newfoundland, 1783–1832, a book based on his thesis. By this stage, he had become well known in the New Zealand art scene with his writings on the subject and his own paintings and etchings. In 1939, on his return to New Zealand, he became director of the National Centennial Exhibition of New Zealand Art, held in 1940.

== Historian ==
Returning to the University of Otago in 1940 as a history lecturer, he became involved in the Otago Centennial Historical Publications as editor. This work included McLintock writing two books in the series. One of these was the well regarded The History of Otago, published in 1949 and which won the Ernest Scott Prize from the University of Melbourne. The same year, an opportunity arose to secure the chair of history at Canterbury University College; however, much to his disappointment he missed out and thereafter held a disregard for the academic establishment. In 1952, he finished lecturing at Otago, having switched subjects to English a few years previously, and took a post as parliamentary historian.

In his new role, McLintock worked on what was intended to be several volumes of a parliamentary history. The first of these, Crown Colony Government in New Zealand, was published in 1958. Rather than continue with the next planned volume, a work on the early years of the Legislative Council, he turned to editing work; A Descriptive Atlas of New Zealand was produced in 1959.

In the 1963 New Year Honours, McLintock was appointed a Commander of the Order of the British Empire. He then took on what was most likely his best known work, the task of co-ordinating and editing the Encyclopaedia of New Zealand. This was a three-volume series of books with in excess of 1,800 entries produced by over three hundred authors. McLintock also wrote several entries across a range of subjects. The encyclopedia was published in November 1966, selling its entire print run of 34,000 copies within months.

McLintock was involved in other work; paintings and etchings were exhibited in Europe, including at the Royal Academy of Arts. He was also on the committee for New Zealand banknotes when it switched to decimal currency. Afflicted by cancer, McLintock retired in early 1968. He died a few months later, on 29 May 1968, in Dunedin. He was survived by his wife, who he had cared for since she suffered a stroke several years previously, and a daughter.
