= Cultural depictions of Charles III =

Charles III, King of the United Kingdom and other Commonwealth realms, has been depicted in art and popular culture.

== Film ==
Charles has been portrayed on screen by:

- Alex Jennings in The Queen (2006)
- Jack Farthing in Spencer (2021)

== Television ==
Charles has been portrayed in television films and series by:

- Eric Idle (in 1978 and 1979), Charles Rocket (in 1980), Tim Curry (in 1981), Jon Lovitz (in 1985 and 1986), Dana Carvey (in 1993), and Seth Meyers (in 2005) on Saturday Night Live
- David Robb in Charles & Diana: A Royal Love Story (1982)
- Christopher Baines in The Royal Romance of Charles and Diana (1982)
- Adam Bareham in Fergie & Andrew: Behind the Palace Doors (1992)
- Roger Rees in Charles and Diana: Unhappily Ever After (1992)
- David Threlfall in Diana: Her True Story (1993)
- Christopher Bowen in Princess in Love (1996)
- Ludger Pistor in Willi und die Windzors (1996)
- Jon Culshaw and Lewis MacLeod in 2DTV (2001-2004)
- Martin Turner in Prince William (2002)
- Laurence Fox in Whatever Love Means (2005)
- Paul Rhys and Martin Turner in the docudrama serial The Queen (2009)
- Eddie Izzard in The Simpsons episode "To Surveil with Love" (2010)
- Ben Cross in William & Kate (2011)
- Victor Garber in William & Catherine: A Royal Romance (2011)
- Billy Jenkins (as a child in Season 1-2), Julian Baring (as an early teenager in Season 2), Josh O'Connor (Season 3-4), and Dominic West (Season 5-6) in The Crown (2016–2023)
- Harry Enfield in The Windsors (2016–2020)
- Tim Pigott-Smith in King Charles III (2017)
- Steve Coulter in Harry & Meghan: A Royal Romance (2018) and Harry & Meghan: Escaping the Palace (2021)
- Charles Shaughnessy in Harry & Meghan: Becoming Royal (2019)
- Chris Robson in Legends of Tomorrow episode "Mortal Khanbat" (2020)
- Dan Stevens in The Prince (2021)
- Munya Chawawa in Prince Andrew: The Musical (2022)
- Larry Dean on Saturday Night Live UK (2026)

A character clearly based on Charles, and named simply as "The King", was played by Michael Kitchen in To Play the King and The Final Cut, the second and third parts of the British House of Cards trilogy (1993 and 1995 respectively).

== Stage ==
Actors who have portrayed Charles in notable stage productions include:

- Marc Sinden in Chorus Girls (1981) and Her Royal Highness..? (1981)
- Tim Pigott-Smith in King Charles III (2014)
- Roe Hartrampf in Diana (2019/2021)
- Harry Enfield in The Windsors: Endgame (2021)

== Novel ==
- Charles appears in two novels by Sue Townsend: The Queen and I (1992) and Queen Camilla (2006).
- Charles is the main character in Michael Dobbs' 2007 political thriller, The Lords' Day.
- Charles appears in Roy Grace thriller series, The Hawk Is Dead (2025), written by Peter James.

== Art ==
Artistic depictions of Charles include:

- His Majesty King Charles III, painting by Jonathan Yeo, held at Drapers' Hall, London
- King Charles III, coronation portrait by Peter Kuhfeld, held at the Throne Room, Buckingham Palace, London
- King Charles III, painting by Bryan Organ, held at the National Portrait Gallery, London
- The Royal Family: A Centenary Portrait, painting by John Wonnacott, held at the National Portrait Gallery, London

== Currencies ==
- Australia – 5 cent coin, 10 cent coin, 20 cent coin, 50 cent coin, 1 dollar coin and 2 dollar coin.
- Canada – $20 note, 5 cent coin, 10 cent coin, 25 cent coin, 50 cent coin, 1 dollar coin, and 2 dollar coin.
- Falkland Islands – £5 banknote, £10 banknote and £20 banknote.
- New Zealand – 10 cent coin, 20 cent coin, 50 cent coin, $1 coin, and $2 coin
- United Kingdom – £5 note, £10 note, £20 note and £50 note; 1 penny; 2 pence, 5 pence, 10 pence, 20 pence; 50 pence, 1 pound and 2 pounds.

== Music ==
Songs about Charles include:

- "Buckingham Blues" by "Weird Al" Yankovic (1983)
- "Prince Charles" by Christine Lavin (1986)
