= New Zealand twenty-cent coin =

Current denomination of New Zealand currency

Twenty cents
- New Zealand
- Value: 0.20 New Zealand dollars
- Mass: 4.00 g
- Diameter: 21.75 mm
- Thickness: 1.56 mm
- Edge: "Spanish flower"
- Composition: Nickel-plated steel
- Years of minting: 2006–present
- Catalog number: –

Obverse
- Design: Queen Elizabeth II
- Designer: Ian Rank-Broadley
- Design date: 1999

Reverse
- Design: Māori carving of Pukaki, a chief of the Ngāti Whakaue iwi
- Designer: Robert Maurice Conly
- Design date: 1990

The New Zealand twenty-cent coin is the second-lowest-denomination coin of the New Zealand dollar. The 20-cent coin was introduced when the New Zealand dollar was introduced on 10 July 1967, replacing the New Zealand florin coin. Its original reverse of a kiwi was changed in 1990 when the image was moved onto the one-dollar coin. In 2006 its size was reduced and its edge altered to a Spanish flower as part of a revision of New Zealand's coins, which also saw its alloy become nickel-plated steel instead of cupro-nickel.

== Design ==
=== 1967 to 1990 ===
Original reverse design by James Berry, used for the larger 20 cent coins 1967–1990

On 10 July 1967, New Zealand decimalised its currency, replacing the pound with the dollar at a rate of one pound to two dollars and one shilling to ten cents. The 20-cent coin directly replaced the one-florin coin, which had been worth two shillings.

Like the florin, the new 20-cent coin was made of cupronickel, 28.58 mm in diameter, 11.31 grams in weight, and had 100% edge milling. The 20-cent coin retained the presence of a kiwi on the reverse of the florin, albeit in a different design by the New Zealand artist, James Berry.

The original obverses of 20-cent coins depicted Arnold Machin's portrait of Queen Elizabeth II. In 1986 the portrait was changed to the one by Raphael Maklouf, which had been introduced to the coins of the pound sterling in the previous year. Mintings of this coin from 1990 are rare.

=== 1990 to 2006 ===
In 1990, the new $1 and $2 coins were released to replace the $1 and $2 notes. As the $1 depicted a kiwi also, the 20-cent's reverse had to be redesigned. The new reverse side featured the well-known Māori carving depicting Pukaki, a chief of the Ngāti Whakaue iwi (tribe) of Te Arawa. In 1999, the portrait of the Queen was changed to a version by Ian Rank-Broadley which had been introduced to the coins of the pound sterling in the previous year. No 20-cent coins were minted between 1991 and 2001.

The existing 20-cent coins remained in circulation and greatly outnumbered the new design until 2006. A total of 169,202,000 pre-2006 20 cent coins were issued, with a total value of $33,840,400.00

=== 2006 onwards ===
On 31 July 2006, the new 20-cent coin was released alongside the new 10-cent and 50-cent coins as part of the Reserve Bank's "Change for the better" silver coin replacement. The new 20-cent coin had the same reverse as the 1990 to 2006 minted coins and the same obverse as the 1999-onward coins, but the coins were reduced in size. The new 20-cent coins are made of steel, covered in a layer of nickel, copper, then nickel again. The new coins are 21.75 mm in diameter and 4 grams in weight. They have Spanish flower milling around the edge, splitting it into seven sections. For their introduction in 2006, 116 million were minted, with a total value of NZ$23.2 million. The only other year of issue was 2008, where 80 million coins and a total value of NZ$16 million were issued.

The old 20-cent coins were demonetised on 1 November 2006.

Coin collectors recognise two distinct varieties of the 2014 20-cent coin. These vary in terms of the detail on both the Maori design and Queen's portrait, but are most easily differentiated in terms of the date shown, with Die I having a standard (wide) date setting and Die II a much narrower setting. Both varieties are common in circulation.

=== Future ===
After the death of Queen Elizabeth II in September 2022, the Reserve Bank said it would exhaust its existing coin stocks before introducing new coins featuring King Charles III. Based on current stock levels, this would likely be several years away.

== Minting figures ==
According to Reserve Bank of New Zealand. Values are in New Zealand dollars. No large 20-cent coins were minted in 1968, 1970, 1991–2001, 2003. Due to the large amount made for the introduction of the small 20-cent, none were minted in 2007 or from 2009 onwards.

- 1967: $2,600,000
- 1969: $500,000
- 1971: $320,000
- 1972: $303,000
- 1973: $610,000
- 1974: $907,000
- 1975: $1,000,000
- 1976: $1,500,000
- 1977: $1,500,000
- 1978: $500,000
- 1979: $1,600,000
- 1980: $1,800,000
- 1981: $1,500,000
- 1982: $3,500,000
- 1983: $500,000
- 1984: $300,000
- 1985: $1,200,000
- 1986: $2,500,000
- 1987: $2,800,000
- 1988: $2,500,000
- 1989: $1,000,000
- 1990: $1,000,000
- 2002: $1,400,000
- 2004: $1,700,000
- 2005: $800,000
- 2006: $23,320,000
- 2008: $16,000,000

== See also ==
- Coins of the New Zealand dollar
