= Coins of the New Zealand dollar =

The coins of the New Zealand dollar are used for the smallest physical currency available in New Zealand. The current denominations are ten cents, twenty cents, fifty cents, one dollar and two dollars. The $1 and $2 coins are minted in a gold colour, the 20c and 50c coins are silver colour and the 10c coin is plated in copper.

Larger denominations of the New Zealand dollar are minted as banknotes of the New Zealand dollar.

== History ==
=== Pre-dollar ===
Prior to 10 July 1967, the New Zealand pound, using the £sd (pounds, shillings and pence) system, was the currency of New Zealand. Coins of the pound tended to follow the size, weight, and composition of their British counterparts. The main coins in usage were the halfpenny (1/2d), penny (1d), threepence (3d), sixpence (6d), shilling (1s), florin (2s), and halfcrown (2s 6d).

=== First coins ===
Decimalisation of the New Zealand currency occurred on 10 July 1967, when the New Zealand pound was replaced by the New Zealand dollar at a rate of one pound to two dollars (10 shillings to a dollar). On the same day, new decimal coins were introduced to replace the existing pound coins. The first coins of the New Zealand dollar were 1c, 2c, 5c, 10c, 20c, and 50c denominations. The 1c and 2c coins were new sizes minted in bronze, smaller than the penny and halfpenny. The new 5c, 10c, and 20c coins were the same size, weight, and value as the former sixpence, shilling, and florin (2s) coins. Indeed, until 1970, the 10c coin bore the additional legend "One Shilling". The new 50c coin was the same size and weight as the half crown but equivalent to twice its value at 5 shillings.

Image	Value	Technical parameters				Description			Date of	
Reverse	Value	Diameter	Thickness	Mass	Composition	Edge	Obverse	Reverse	Issue	Withdrawal
	1c	17.53 mm	1.18 mm	2.07 g	Bronze	Plain	Queen Elizabeth II	Silver fern	10 Jul 1967	30 Apr 1990
	2c	21.08 mm	1.7 mm	4.14 g	Bronze	Plain	Queen Elizabeth II	Kowhai flowers	10 Jul 1967	30 Apr 1990
	5c	19.43 mm	1.24 mm	2.83 g	Cupronickel	Milled	Queen Elizabeth II	Tuatara	10 Jul 1967	31 Oct 2006
	10c	23.62 mm	1.70 mm	5.66 g	Cupronickel	Milled	Queen Elizabeth II	(as today); Legend reads "One Shilling"	10 Jul 1967	31 Oct 2006
	10c	23.62 mm	1.70 mm	5.66 g	Cupronickel	Milled	Queen Elizabeth II	(as today)	1970	31 Oct 2006
	20c	28.58 mm	2.22 mm	11.31 g	Cupronickel	Milled	Queen Elizabeth II	Kiwi	10 Jul 1967	31 Oct 2006
	20c	28.58 mm	2.22 mm	11.31 g	Cupronickel	Milled	Queen Elizabeth II	(as today)	Dec 1990	31 Oct 2006
	50c	31.75 mm	2.33 mm	13.61 g	Cupronickel	Intermittently milled	Queen Elizabeth II	(as today)	10 Jul 1967	31 Oct 2006
	$1	38.8 mm	2.89 mm	28.28 g	Cupronickel	Milled	Queen Elizabeth II	Various Commemorative Designs	10 Jul 1967	Obsolete but still legal tender. Replaced by current dollar coin on 11 February 1991.
These images are to scale at 2.5 pixels per millimetre. For table standards, see the coin specification table.

The obverse designs of all the coins featured Arnold Machin's portrait of Elizabeth II, with the legend ELIZABETH II NEW ZEALAND [date]. The initial designs for the reverse sides of the coins introduced in 1967 were rejected by the Royal Mint. Several more designs were produced, followed by a vigorous public debate. James Berry's designs were eventually accepted for most of the coins, although he was asked to rework his design for the 5c coin and Francis Shurrock's design for the 10c coin.

In 1986, the portrait of Elizabeth II on New Zealand coins was changed to Raphael Maklouf's new portrait of the Queen.

=== Removal of 1 and 2 cent coins ===
Towards the end of the 1980s, the 1c and 2c were becoming of little value, and it was decided to withdraw these coins from circulation. The last coins of these denominations were minted for circulation in 1987, with collector coins being made for 1988. The coins were slowly withdrawn from circulation, before finally being demonetised (no longer legal tender) on 1 May 1990.

After the withdrawal of these coins, cash transactions were normally rounded to the nearest 5 cents, a process known as Swedish rounding. Some larger retailers, in the interests of public relations, elected to round the total price down (so that $4.99 became $4.95 instead of $5.00). Alternatively, many retailers rounded all their prices to the nearest 5 cents to avoid the issue entirely—so a New Zealand shopper often encountered products for sale at prices like $4.95.

=== Introduction of 1 and 2 dollar coins ===
On 11 February 1991, $1 and $2 coins were introduced to replace the $1 and $2 notes in circulation. These coins were minted in aluminium bronze, and were the first New Zealand coins to be minted to metric specifications.

At the same time, because the new $1 coin depicted a kiwi, the 20c coin reverse design was changed. The new 20c coins depicted a Māori carving of Pukaki, a chief of the Ngati Whakaue iwi. Coins with kiwi design, however, outnumbered coins with the new design until they were replaced with the new 20c coins, all depicting the later design, in 2006.

In 1999, Ian Rank-Broadley's portrait of the Queen was introduced and the legend rearranged to read NEW ZEALAND ELIZABETH II [date].

=== Change to smaller coins ===
On 11 November 2004, the Reserve Bank announced that it proposed to take the 5c coin out of circulation, and to make the existing 50, 20 and 10c coins smaller and use plated steel to make them lighter. The reasons given were:

- The 5c coin was worth a third of what a cent was worth back in 1967, when New Zealand decimalised its currency.
- Surveys had found that 50, 20 and 10c coins were too large and could not be easily carried in large quantities. The original 50c coin, with a diameter of 3.2 centimetres, was one of the largest coins in circulation worldwide, and the original 20c coin, New Zealand's second biggest coin at the time at 2.8 cm, is bigger than any current circulating coin (the biggest coin in circulation is the $2 coin at 2.6 cm).
- The size of the 10c piece was too close to that of the dollar - in fact, it was so close that it was possible to put two 10c pieces in a parking meter together and receive $1 worth of parking time, or jam the meter and make parking free anyway. The advent of pay & display metering in larger cities, whereby one is required to use another meter if the first one is jammed, has largely stopped this practice.
- The prices of copper and nickel used to mint the old coins were high and rising steeply, and the metal content of some coins exceeded their face value.

After a three-month public submission period that ended on 4 February 2005, the Reserve Bank announced on 31 March that it would go ahead with the proposed changes. The changeover period started on 31 July 2006, with the old coins usable up until 31 October 2006.

The older 50, 20, 10 and 5c pieces are no longer legal tender, but are still able to be handed in at the Reserve Bank in Wellington, either in person or by post, in exchange for their face value. Any old currency surrendered in this way for its face value must be paid directly into a bank account. This can be either a New Zealand account in New Zealand Dollars, or a Foreign bank account in any of the following five currencies: USD, CAD, GBP, AUD, or EUR.

In August 2005, the Royal Canadian Mint, which has minted Canadian coins in plated steel in the past, was selected by the Reserve Bank to make the new coins. The new coins have a unique electromagnetic signature which enables modern vending machines to determine coin counterfeiting and foreign coins, and it was estimated the changeover would remove nearly $5 million of foreign coinage from circulation.

The change to smaller coins is also advantageous to Australia, as the outgoing 5, 10, and 20c coins were of the same size and weight as Australian coins of these denominations, and were easily confused by shopkeepers and retailers, as well as being usable in Australian vending machines, parking meters, and coin deposit machines at banks.

== Current coinage ==
The reverse designs of the current circulating New Zealand dollar coins. Image by Reserve Bank of New Zealand.

As of 1 April 2018, there are five denominations of coins in regular circulation: 10c, 20c, 50c, $1, and $2. All New Zealand coins are round, and use medallic orientation.

Value	Technical parameters				Description			Date of issue
Value	Diameter	Thickness	Mass	Composition	Edge	Obverse	Reverse	Date of issue
10c	20.50 mm	1.58 mm	3.30 g	Copper-plated steel	Plain	Queen Elizabeth II	A Māori koruru, or carved head.	31 Jul 2006
20c	21.75 mm	1.56 mm	4.00 g	Nickel-plated steel	"Spanish flower"	Queen Elizabeth II	Māori carving of Pukaki, a chief of the Ngati Whakaue iwi between traditional koru kowhaiwhai patterns	31 Jul 2006
50c	24.75 mm	1.70 mm	5.00 g	Nickel-plated steel	Plain	Queen Elizabeth II	HM Bark Endeavour and Mount Taranaki	31 Jul 2006
$1	23.00 mm	2.74 mm	8 g	Aluminium bronze (92% copper, 2% nickel and 6% aluminium)	Intermittent milling	Queen Elizabeth II	Kiwi and silver fern	11 Feb 1991
$2	26.50 mm	2.70 mm	10 g	Aluminium bronze (92% copper, 2% nickel and 6% aluminium)	Grooved	Queen Elizabeth II	Kōtuku / white heron (eastern great egret)	11 Feb 1991
For table standards, see the coin specification table.

Commemorative and collectable coins are available from New Zealand Post as the agent for the Reserve Bank.

There are two commemorative coins currently in circulation as legal tender. The first one was released on 23 March 2015 and has a monetary value of 50c. It features the standard obverse design but on the reverse it features two soldiers, one New Zealander and one Australian surrounded by two ferns and a mangopare (hammerhead shark) design; with the words "The Spirit of Anzac We Will Remember Them" and "1915–2015" in reference to the 100th anniversary of the Battle of Gallipoli in 1915. It is the first circulating coin to feature colour, a black background around the soldiers. The coins are limited to 1,000,000 and were minted by Canadian Mint.

The second one was released on 1 October 2018 and also has a monetary value of 50c. It also features the standard obverse design but on the reverse it features an RSA poppy in the middle, surrounded by a free formed remembrance wreath that has incorporated the silver fern and the koru; with the words "Eleventh Hour of the Eleventh Day of the Eleventh Month". It was issued to commemorate the 100th anniversary of Armistice Day. It is the second circulating coin to feature colour. The coins are limited to 2,000,000 and were minted by the Canadian Mint.

=== Future ===
After the death of Queen Elizabeth II in September 2022, the Reserve Bank said it would exhaust its existing coin stocks before introducing new coins featuring King Charles III. Based on current stock levels, this would likely be several years away. The effigy of King Charles III has appeared on New Zealand's proof coins since 2024. In May 2025, the Reserve Bank confirmed 10 cent coins with the effigy of King Charles III will enter circulation around 2027.

== Other coins ==
=== Mule coins ===
Numerous mule coins have been accidentally minted, at least two of which have ended up in circulation.

The first instance occurred in 1967, when the two cent coin was accidentally minted with the obverse of the Bahamian five cent coin.

Subsequent examples include a New Zealand 1981 5c obverse muled with a Canadian 10c reverse and a 1985 50c obverse muled with a Canadian $1, both of which are extremely rare.

Another example occurred in 2000, with ten known instances of the commemorative $5 coin found in uncirculated sets. This coin had the pied cormorant on the reverse side, as did the other $5 coins of the year, however the obverse was from Solomon Islands.

Though not technically a mule, a mix-up of a different kind arose in 1975 when some NZ 20c coins were accidentally struck on scalloped blanks intended for the Hong Kong $2 coin. The obverse and reverse dies are correct for the NZ coins; only the blank is the incorrect shape.

An earlier reported instance of a mule involving the small-sized 20c coin introduced in 2006 with a Canadian 5c most probably relates to reports in the press of the discovery of Canadian 5c coins in mint rolls of NZ 20c coins, mainly in the Taranaki region; this was simply a packaging error and no actual muled coins are known.

=== Commemorative coins ===
- Silver dollars: New Zealand has produced many silver dollars, usually annually, from 1967 onwards.
  - 1967: Decimalisation of New Zealand's currency
  - 1969: 200th anniversary of the landing of Captain Cook in New Zealand
  - 1970: Mount Cook
  - 1970: Cook Islands
  - 1971–1973: New Zealand Coat of Arms
  - 1974: 1974 Commonwealth Games in Christchurch
  - 1974: New Zealand Day, 6 February
  - 1975–1976: New Zealand Coat of Arms
  - 1977: 25th Anniversary of accession of Elizabeth II to Queen of New Zealand, on Waitangi Day (6 February)
  - 1978: 25th anniversary of the coronation of Queen Elizabeth II on 2 June
  - 1980: Fantail bird
  - 1981: Royal Visit by Queen Elizabeth II
  - 1982: Takahē bird
  - 1983: Royal Visit by Charles, Prince of Wales and Diana, Princess of Wales
  - 1983: 50th Anniversary of New Zealand coinage
  - 1984: Chatham Island black robin
  - 1985: Black stilt
  - 1986: Royal Visit by Queen Elizabeth II
  - 1986: Kākāpō (native parrot)
  - 1987: National Parks
  - 1988: Yellow-eyed penguin
  - 1989: 1990 Commonwealth Games in Auckland (4 variants, runner, gymnast, swimmer, weightlifter)
  - 1990: 150th Anniversary of the (Treaty of Waitangi)
- A range of two-dollar coins depicting a kingfisher were made during 1993.
- Five dollar coins: Minted sporadically from 1990 onwards. Five dollar coins have never been minted for circulation but specifically for commemorative purposes. They are legal tender.
- Ten dollar coins: Minted sporadically from 1995 onwards. Ten dollar coins have never been minted for circulation. They are legal tender.
- Twenty dollar coins: Minted in 1995 and 1997, only 2 sets of twenty-dollar coins have been made.
- One Hundred and Fifty dollar coins: Minted in 1990 and 1998, only 2 sets of one hundred and fifty dollar coins have been made.
- 1 million commemorative 50-cent coins were issued in 2015 to mark the centenary of the Gallipoli landings. Unlike previous New Zealand commemorative issues, they entered general circulation.
- 2 million commemorative 50-cent coins were issued in 2018 to mark the centenary of Armistice Day. These also entered general circulation.

== Limits on coins constituting legal tender ==
According to the Reserve Bank Act 1989, there are limits on the amount that constitutes legal tender:

- coins of a denomination of $10 or more, there is no limit
- coins of a denomination of $1 or more but less than $10, the limit is $100
- coins of the denomination of 5 cents or more, but less than $1, the limit is $5

== Use of other countries' coins ==
Due to regional travel and the fact that many other former British colonies around the world use coinage systems with British-derived origins of sizing and weight, many Fijian, Samoan, Singaporean, South African, old pre-decimal Pound Sterling and especially Australian coins had been in daily circulation in New Zealand despite not being official legal tender. It is of note that the United Kingdom itself does not use these sizes of coins any more, and there has been the odd case of foreign coins appearing in a customer's change. The consistently similar but not significantly higher value of the Australian currency and the obverse side of Australian coins being almost the same as New Zealand coins also didn't discourage this practice, with millions of 5, 10, and 20 cent Australian coins having been used in New Zealand in an identical manner to their true counterparts. These coins could circulate for long periods without being recognised. The coinage size and material changeover (see section Change to smaller coins above) of 31 July to 31 October 2006 means these foreign coins can no longer be accepted interchangeably, though the new 10 cent coin strongly resembles the British one penny coin in size, weight and appearance and the unchanged one dollar coin remains very similar to the Fijian counterpart. There is also occasional confusion between the New Zealand one-dollar coin and the Australian two dollar coin, and similarly between the New Zealand two dollar coin and Australian one dollar coin, on account of the coins' similar sizes and weights.

== Minting figures ==
Minting figures for coins in the range from 1 cent to 2 dollars, between the years 1967 and 2025:

Year	1c	2c	5c	10c	20c	50c	$1	$2
1967	120,000,000	75,000,000	26,000,000	17,000,000	13,000,000	10,000,000		
1968								
1969		20,510,000	10,260,000	3,000,000	2,500,000			
1970	10,060,000		11,152,000	2,046,000				
1971	10,000,000	15,050,000	11,520,000	2,808,000	1,600,000	1,123,200		
1972	10,040,000	17,510,000	20,000,000	2,024,000	1,516,000	1,408,000		
1973	15,040,000	38,550,000	4,043,000	3,533,000	3,051,000	2,531,000		
1974	35,020,000	50,000,000	18,023,000	4,627,000	4,535,000	1,223,000		
1975	60,000,000	20,000,000	32,000,000	7,000,000	5,000,000	3,800,000		
1976	20,000,000	15,000,000		5,000,000	7,500,000	2,000,000		
1977		20,000,000		5,000,000	7,500,000	2,000,000		
1978	15,000,000		20,000,000	16,000,000	2,500,000	2,000,000		
1979	35,000,000			6,000,000	8,000,000	2,400,000		
1980	40,000,000	10,000,000	12,000,000	28,000,000	9,000,000	8,000,000		
1981	10,000,000	25,000,000	20,000,000	5,000,000	7,500,000	4,000,000		
1982	10,000,000	50,000,000	50,000,000	18,000,000	17,500,000	6,000,000		
1983	40,000,000	15,000,000			2,500,000			
1984	30,000,000	10,000,000			1,500,000	2,000,000		
1985	40,000,000	22,500,000	14,000,000	8,000,000	6,000,000	2,000,000		
1986	25,000,000		18,000,000		12,500,000	5,200,000		
1987	27,500,000	36,250,000	40,000,000	21,000,000	14,000,000	3,600,000		
1988			16,000,000	23,712,000	12,500,000	8,800,000		
1989			36,000,000	9,000,000	5,000,000			
1990 – 1c and 2c withdrawn; $1 and $2 introduced
1990					5,000,000		40,000,000	30,000,000
1991							10,000,000	10,000,000
1992								
1993								
1994			26,720,000					
1995			33,280,000					
1996			19,008,000	12,960,000				
1997			14,000,000	8,000,000				1,000,000
1998			8,000,000					6,000,000
1999			25,040,000					5,050,000
2000			26,000,000	11,000,000			5,000,000	
2001			20,000,000	10,000,000		5,000,000		3,000,000
2002			40,500,000	10,000,000	7,000,000	3,000,000	8,000,000	6,000,000
2003			30,000,000	13,000,000		2,500,000	4,000,000	6,000,000
2004			15,000,000	6,500,000	8,500,000	2,000,000	2,700,000	
2005				2,000,000	4,000,000	1,000,000	2,000,000	5,000,000
2006 – 5c withdrawn; 10c, 20c and 50c downsized
2006				140,200,000	116,600,000	70,200,000		
2007				15,000,000				
2008					80,000,000		11,000,000	8,000,000
2009				30,000,000		20,000,000		
2010							10,000,000	
2011				20,400,000				8,000,000
2012				20,400,000				
2013				27,000,000			10,080,000	
2014				17,000,000	23,000,000	2,300,000		7,000,000
2015				21,600,000	18,000,000	12,700,000	10,000,000	3,000,000
2016				11,100,000		6,000,000		3,000,000
2017								
2018						6,000,000		
2019				37,800,000	40,750,000	21,000,000	12,960,000	12,200,000
2020				19,200,000	8,000,000	8,200,000	8,760,000	5,900,000
2021								
2022					10,000,000			8,000,000
2023								
2024				22,200,000				
2025								
2026								

== See also ==
- New Zealand dollar
- Coins of the Australian dollar
- Coins of the Canadian dollar
- Coins of the New Zealand pound
