= New Zealand two-cent coin =

Former denomination of New Zealand currency

Two cents
- New Zealand
- Value: 0.02 New Zealand dollars
- Mass: 4.14 g
- Diameter: 21.08 mm
- Composition: bronze
- Years of minting: 1967-1987
- Catalog number: -

Obverse
- Design: Elizabeth II, Queen of New Zealand
- Designer: Raphael Maklouf
- Design date: 1986

Reverse
- Design: Two kōwhai flowers and leaves surrounding the figure “2”
- Designer: Reginald George James Berry
- Design date: 1967

The New Zealand two-cent coin was the second smallest denomination coin of the New Zealand dollar from the currency's introduction in 1967 to its demonetisation, along with the one-cent coin, on 30 April 1990. Its reverse featured two kōwhai flowers, considered emblematic of New Zealand. The image was designed by Reginald George James Berry, who designed the reverses for all coins introduced that year.

== History ==
Coins of the New Zealand dollar were introduced on 10 July 1967 to replace the pre-decimal New Zealand pound, which was pegged to the British pound. The dollar was pegged at two to a pound, thus 200 cents to the pound. The new two-cent coin replaced the old threepence coin. The original obverse was Arnold Machin's portrait of Queen Elizabeth II, and was used until 1985.

In 1986 the portrait was changed to the version by Raphael Maklouf, introduced to the coins of the pound sterling in 1985. In 1988, the bronze one and two-cent coins had become too expensive to produce as inflation lowered the value of the dollar and their minting ceased. They remained legal tender until 30 April 1990.

Counting proofs and coins in mint sets, a total of 441,152,065 (441 million) coins of the denomination were minted during its existence, a total value of $8,823,041.30

== See also ==
- Coins of the New Zealand dollar
