= Two-cent coin =

Two-cent coin or two-cent piece is a small-value coin minted for various decimal currencies using the cent as their hundredth subdivision.

Examples include:

- Two-cent coin (Australia)
- Two-cent coin (New Zealand)
- Two-cent piece (United States), a historical U.S. coin
- Two-cent billon, a historical U.S. coin
- 2 cent euro coin
- Two-cent coin, a coin of the South African rand

== See also ==
- 2 cents (disambiguation)
- Cent (currency)
- Category:Two-cent coins
