= New Zealand ten-cent coin =

Lowest physical currency in New Zealand

Ten cents
- New Zealand
- Value: 0.10 New Zealand dollars
- Mass: 3.30 g
- Diameter: 20.5 mm
- Thickness: 1.58 mm
- Edge: unmilled
- Composition: Copper-plated steel
- Years of minting: 2006–present
- Catalog number: –

Obverse
- Design: Elizabeth II; Charles III
- Designer: Ian Rank-Broadley; Dan Thorne
- Design date: 1999 (IRB), 2024 (DT)

Reverse
- Design: A Māori carved mask or koruru with Māori rafter patterns
- Designer: Reginald George James Berry
- Design date: 1967

The New Zealand ten-cent coin is the lowest-denomination coin of the New Zealand dollar. The 10-cent coin was introduced when the New Zealand dollar was introduced on 10 July 1967, replacing the New Zealand shilling coin. In 2006 its size was reduced as part of a revision of New Zealand's coins, which also saw its alloy become copper-plated steel.

== Design ==
=== 1967 to 2006 ===
On 10 July 1967, New Zealand decimalised its currency, replacing the pound with the dollar at a rate of one pound to two dollars and one shilling to ten cents. The 10-cent coin was introduced to directly replace the one-shilling coin.

The coin was made of cupronickel, 23.62 millimetres in diameter, and weighed 5.66 grams. It included the words "one shilling" for the years 1967, 1968 and 1969; this was dropped in 1970.

==== Obverse designs ====
- 1967–1985: Arnold Machin's portrait of Queen Elizabeth II
- 1986–1998: Raphael Maklouf's portrait of Queen Elizabeth II
- 1999–2005: Ian Rank-Broadley's portrait of Queen Elizabeth II

=== 2006 onwards ===
On 31 July 2006, the new 10-cent coin was released alongside the new 20-cent and 50-cent coins as part of the Reserve Bank's "Change for the better" silver coin replacement. The new 10-cent coin had the same reverse as the 1967 to 2006 minted coins and the same obverse as the 1999-onward coins, but the coins were reduced in size. The new 10-cent coins are made of steel, plated with copper. The new coins are 20.5 millimetres in diameter and 3.30 gram in weight. They have unmilled edges. It also appears that the new coin has taken on a possible new feature located between the tongue of the tiki: two small letters, J on the left side and B on the right, engraved into the coin.

The old 10-cent coins were demonetised on 1 November 2006, and they could be exchanged for current legal tender at commercial banks for a limited time. A total of 260,210,000 old 10-cent coins were issued, a total value of $26,021,000.00.

From 2006 to 2024, 381,190,000 10-cent coins have been minted, a total value of $38,190,000.00

After the death of Queen Elizabeth II in September 2022, the Reserve Bank said it would exhaust its existing coin stocks before introducing new coins featuring King Charles III. In March 2024 the Reserve bank confirmed that new 10 cent coins will be minted featuring King Charles III around 2025 and be released 2 years later. In 2024, the first 22,200,000 King Charles III 10-cent coins were minted and are expected to be released around 2026.

== Mintage Figures ==
=== 2006 Onwards ===
Year	Mintings
2006	140,200,000
2007	15,000,000
2009	30,000,000
2011	20,400,000
2012	20,400,000
2013	27,000,000
2014	17,000,000
2015	21,600,000
2016	11,100,000
2019	37,800,000
2020	19,200,000
2024	22,200,000
Total	381,900,000

Total value: $38,190,000.

== See also ==
- Coins of the New Zealand dollar
