= Australian fifty-cent coin =

Current denomination of Australian currency

Fifty cents
- Australia
- Value: 0.50 AUD
- Mass: 15.55 g
- Diameter: 31.65 (across flats) mm
- Thickness: 2.80 mm (maximum)
- Edge: Plain
- Shape: Dodecagonal
- Composition: 75% copper, 25% nickel
- Years of minting: 1969–present
- Catalog number: —

Obverse
- Design: Queen Elizabeth II (1969–2023); King Charles III (2024–present)
- Designer: Various (1969–2023); Dan Thorne (2024–present)
- Design date: 2024

Reverse
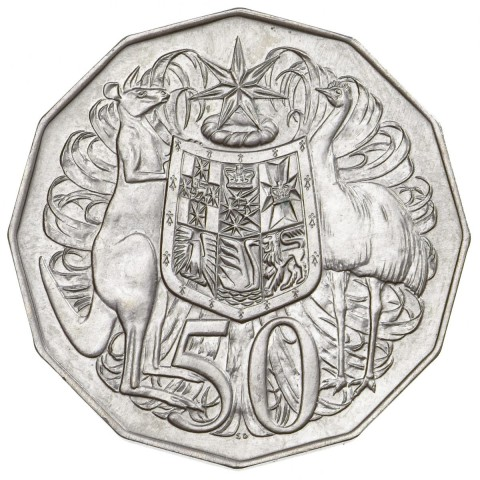
- Design: Australian coat of arms
- Designer: Stuart Devlin
- Design date: 1965

The twelve-sided fifty-cent coin is the third-highest denomination coin of the Australian dollar, worth 1/2 of a dollar. It is the largest sized coin in circulation. It is equal in size and shape to the Cook Island $5 coin, and both remain the only 12-sided coins in the southern hemisphere. It was introduced in 1969 to replace the round fifty-cent coin issued in 1966.

The original, round, 50-cent coin was made of 80% silver and 20% copper; but as the value of a free-floating silver price became higher, the coin's bullion value became more valuable than its face value; so that version was withdrawn from circulation and replaced with the dodecagonal cupro-nickel version.

It is by diameter the largest Australian coin currently issued and second largest after the Crown of 1937–38. It is also the heaviest Australian coin in common circulation. Many commemorative designs have been issued, the large size allowing for detailed content.

With a diameter of 31.65 millimetres (1.246 in) across flats, the 50-cent coin is one of the largest in volume among those currently circulating in the world. One coin of larger diameter is the Costa Rican five-hundred-colón (32.9 millimetres (1.30 in)); the larger fifty-franc (CFP) (32.9 millimetres (1.30 in)) discontinued in January 2023 by the smaller F 50 (24.0 millimetres (0.94 in)).

The 1986, 1987, 1989, 1990, 1992, year dated 50c are only available in mint and proof sets, with the exception of the 1967 and 1968, as no mint/proof sets exist for those years and there were no circulation strikes produced either.

Fifty-cent coins are legal tender for amounts not exceeding $5 for any payment of a debt.

== Obverse ==
As with all coins of Australia, the reigning monarch features on the obverse. Elizabeth II and Charles III have been featured on the coin so far.

Unlike other decimal denominations, five different portraits of the queen have been used on 50-cent coins. A unique effigy by Vladimir Gottwald was used for the 2000 royal visit commemorative fifty-cent piece. This is the only Australian decimal coin to have an obverse designed by an Australian and to have a portrait of the queen which is not also used on British currency.

The other four portraits have featured on all then-current denominations: from 1966 to 1984 one by Arnold Machin, from 1985 to 1998 one by Raphael Maklouf, from 1999 to 2019 a portrait by Ian Rank-Broadley, and since 2019 a portrait by Jody Clark. These portraits were introduced to British coins in 1968, 1985, 1998 and 2015, respectively.

== Commemorative coins ==
The Australian fifty-cent coin was the first to display a variation of the reverse design in 1970 for the commemorating the bicentennial of Lieutenant James Cook's landing in Australia. Various other designs followed until the one-dollar and twenty-cent coins also included new designs.

Year	Subject	Mintage
1970	Bicentenary of James Cook's 1770 voyage	16,500,000
1977	25th anniversary of the accession of Queen Elizabeth II	25,000,000
1981	Marriage of HRH the Prince of Wales and Lady Diana Spencer	20,000,000
1982	Brisbane XII Commonwealth Games	49,600,000
1988	Australian Bicentenary	9,000,000
1991	25th anniversary of decimal currency	4,700,000
1994	United Nations International Year of the Family	21,300,000
1995	50th anniversary of the end of World War II – Edward 'Weary' Dunlop	15,900,000
1998	200th anniversary of the voyage of Bass and Flinders	22,400,000
2000	Millennium year	16,600,000
2000	Royal visit of Queen Elizabeth II	5,100,000
2001	Centenary of Federation – Australian Coat of Arms	43,100,000
2001	Centenary of Federation – Australian Capital Territory (ACT)	2,000,000
2001	Centenary of Federation – New South Wales (NSW)	3,000,000
2001	Centenary of Federation – Norfolk Island	2,200,000
2001	Centenary of Federation – Northern Territory (NT)	2,100,000
2001	Centenary of Federation – Queensland (QLD)	2,300,000
2001	Centenary of Federation – South Australia (SA)	2,400,000
2001	Centenary of Federation – Tasmania (TAS)	2,200,000
2001	Centenary of Federation – Victoria (VIC)	2,800,000
2001	Centenary of Federation – Western Australia (WA)	2,400,000
2002	Year of the Outback	11,500,000
2003	Australia's volunteers	13,900,000
2004	Primary school design competition winner (John Serrano)	10,200,000
2005	60th anniversary of the end of World War II	26,600,000
2005	Secondary school Commonwealth Games design competition winner (Kelly Just)	20,500,000
2010	Australia Day	11,400,000
2014	50th anniversary of the Australian Institute of Aboriginal and Torres Strait Islander Studies	3,000,000
2016	50th anniversary of decimal currency	7,000,000
2017	50th anniversary of the 1967 referendum & 25th anniversary of the Mabo decision	1,400,000
2019	International Year of Indigenous Languages	2,000,000
2024	50th anniversary of the National Aboriginal and Islanders Day Observance Committee	2,310,000
2026	60th anniversary of the Wave Hill walk-Off & 50th anniversary of Aboriginal land rights	TBA

== See also ==
- Coins of the Australian dollar

Preceded by Australian round fifty-cent coin	Fifty cents (Australian); 1969–present	Succeeded by Current
