= New Zealand five-cent coin =

Obsolete denomination of New Zealand currency

Five cents
- New Zealand
- Value: 0.05 New Zealand dollars
- Mass: 2.83 g
- Diameter: 19.43 mm
- Thickness: 1.24 mm
- Edge: fully milled
- Composition: Cupronickel
- Years of minting: 1967–2006
- Catalog number: -

Obverse
- Design: Queen Elizabeth II
- Designer: Ian Rank-Broadley
- Design date: 1999

Reverse
- Design: A tuatara, native only to New Zealand, sitting on a coastal rock.
- Designer: Reginald George James Berry
- Design date: 1967

The New Zealand five-cent coin was the lowest denomination coin of the New Zealand dollar from 1990 to 2006. The five-cent coin was introduced when the New Zealand dollar was introduced on 10 July 1967, replacing the New Zealand sixpence coin. On 31 July 2006 it was eliminated as part of a revision of New Zealand's coins, and it was demonetised on 1 November 2006.

== History ==
The five-cent coin was introduced on 10 July 1967 with the decimalisation of New Zealand currency, where the New Zealand dollar replaced the New Zealand pound at a rate of two dollars to a pound, with six pence in the old pound currency equaling five cents in the new one. The new five cent coin was the same size and composition as the old sixpence coin it replaced to ease the transition. The coin was made of cupronickel, 19.43 mm in diameter, and weighed 2.83 grams.

By the early 2000s, the five-cent coin had become of little value due to inflation, and its costs to produce had long exceeded its face value. The coin was subsequently demonetised on 1 November 2006.

Counting proofs and coins in mint sets, a total of 617,508,200 coins of the denomination were minted during its existence, a total value of $30,875,410.00.

In 2017, American author John Green requested that some of the coins be given to him to give away as gifts on his upcoming book tour. He put out a video about the experience in November 2017.

== See also ==
- Coins of the New Zealand dollar
