= Australian round fifty-cent coin =

Discontinued Australian coin design

Fifty cents
- Australia
- Value: 0.50 AUD
- Mass: 13.28 g
- Diameter: 31.51 mm
- Thickness: 2.00 mm
- Edge: milled
- Composition: 80% silver, 20% copper
- Years of minting: 1966
- Catalog number: —

Obverse
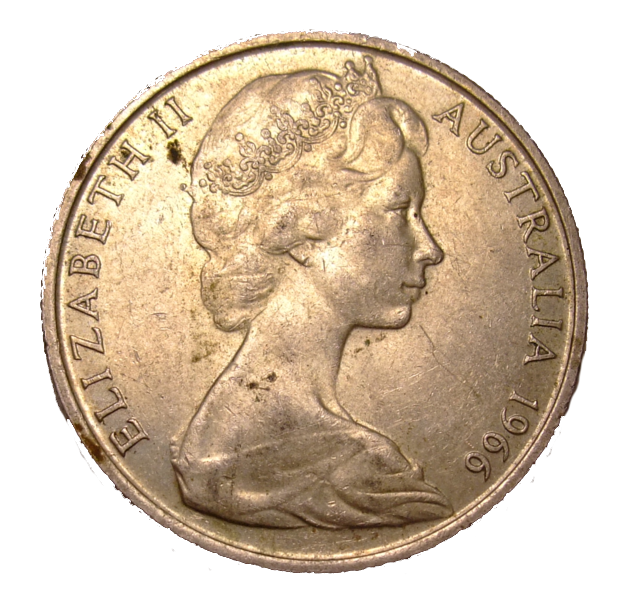
- Design: Queen Elizabeth II, Queen of Australia
- Designer: Arnold Machin
- Design date: 1966

Reverse
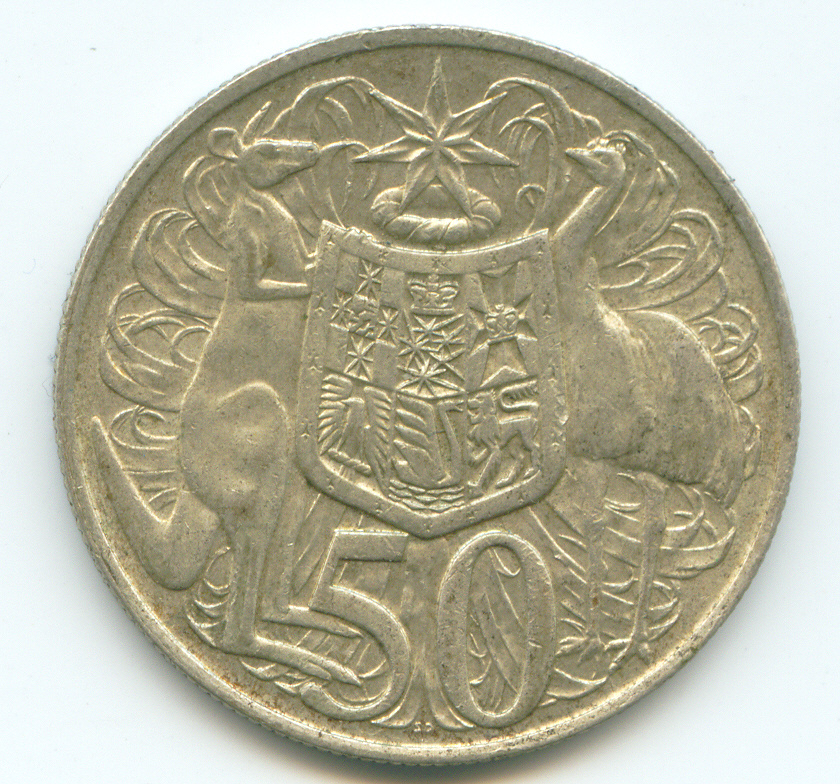
- Design: Coat of arms of Australia
- Designer: Stuart Devlin
- Design date: 1965

The round fifty cent coin was the highest-denomination and largest diameter coin of the Australian dollar when it was introduced on 14 February 1966 as part of the transition to decimal currency. (Note: The higher denomination – and physically smaller – $1 and $2 coins were introduced in 1984 and 1988 respectively.) It has a nominal value of half an Australian dollar, equivalent to five shillings of the Australian pound that the dollar replaced. Due to the large number minted in 1966, and the rising cost of silver, it was not made in any other year. It was replaced by a twelve-sided 50 cent coin in 1969, which retained its reverse of the Australian coat of arms.

The round fifty cent coin contained 80% silver and 20% copper but, because the value of silver quickly increased after the coins were issued, their bullion value became higher than their face value, so they were withdrawn from circulation. A total of 36.45 million coins were minted, with 14 million being put into circulation.

Round 50 cent coins are still legal tender, but they are rarely used as means of payment as their precious metal value greatly exceeds their face value.

== General references ==
- Ian W. Pitt, ed. (2000). Renniks Australian Coin and Banknote Values (19th ed.). Chippendale, NSW: Renniks Publications. ISBN 0-9585574-4-6.

Preceded by No modern predecessor	Fifty cents (Australian); 1966	Succeeded by Fifty cent coin (Australian)
