= The Royal Family: A Centenary Portrait =

Painting by John Wonnacott

- Artist: John Wonnacott
- Year: 2000
- Medium: Oil on canvas
- Dimensions: 366.3 cm × 249.3 cm (144.2 in × 98.1 in)
- Location: National Portrait Gallery, London

The Royal Family: A Centenary Portrait is an oil-on-canvas painting by English artist John Wonnacott, from 2000. It is part of the collection of the National Portrait Gallery (NPG) in London. The painting depicts Queen Elizabeth the Queen Mother in her centenary year surrounded by her daughter Queen Elizabeth II and son-in-law Prince Philip, her grandson Prince Charles (later King Charles III) and her great-grandsons Prince William and Prince Harry. It was commissioned by trustees of the NPG in 1999 ahead of the Queen Mother's 100th birthday.

== Description ==
The painting depicts the royal family in the White Drawing Room at Buckingham Palace, similar to Sir John Lavery's portrait of King George V and his family, The Royal Family at Buckingham Palace (1913). Wonnacott was noted to have been a follower of realism painting and influenced by the works of Sir William Coldstream and Walter Sickert. Unlike Lavery's 1913 portrait, Wonnacott tried to mix the formality afforded by the setting with the contemporary appearance and relaxed attitudes of his subjects.

The portrait shows four generations of the House of Windsor, with the Queen Mother seated on a yellow chair and Prince Harry leaning onto it. Prince Charles and the Queen stand on either side while Prince Philip stands in the background. The royal corgis are also depicted at the feet of the Queen Mother and Prince William in the foreground. In a satirical piece for The Guardian discussing the best and worst royal portraits, John Crace pointed out the corgis blending in with the carpet, stating "It's not a pattern in the carpet, Granny. It's a corgi." With the Queen Mother at its centre, the entire group is tucked away in the lower portion of the painting.

Each of the subjects sat for up to seven hours for the artist and the painting process took about a year. The portrait was exhibited at the gallery between 2000 and 2006 loaned to Beningbrough Hall between 2014 and 2016.
