= Kauri bond =

A Kauri bond is a bond denominated in New Zealand dollars that is issued by a foreign (i.e. non New Zealand) issuer. The first issue took place in 2004.

The name "kauri" comes from one of the New Zealand's larger native trees.
