= Aspet, Haute-Garonne =

Aspet
- Commune
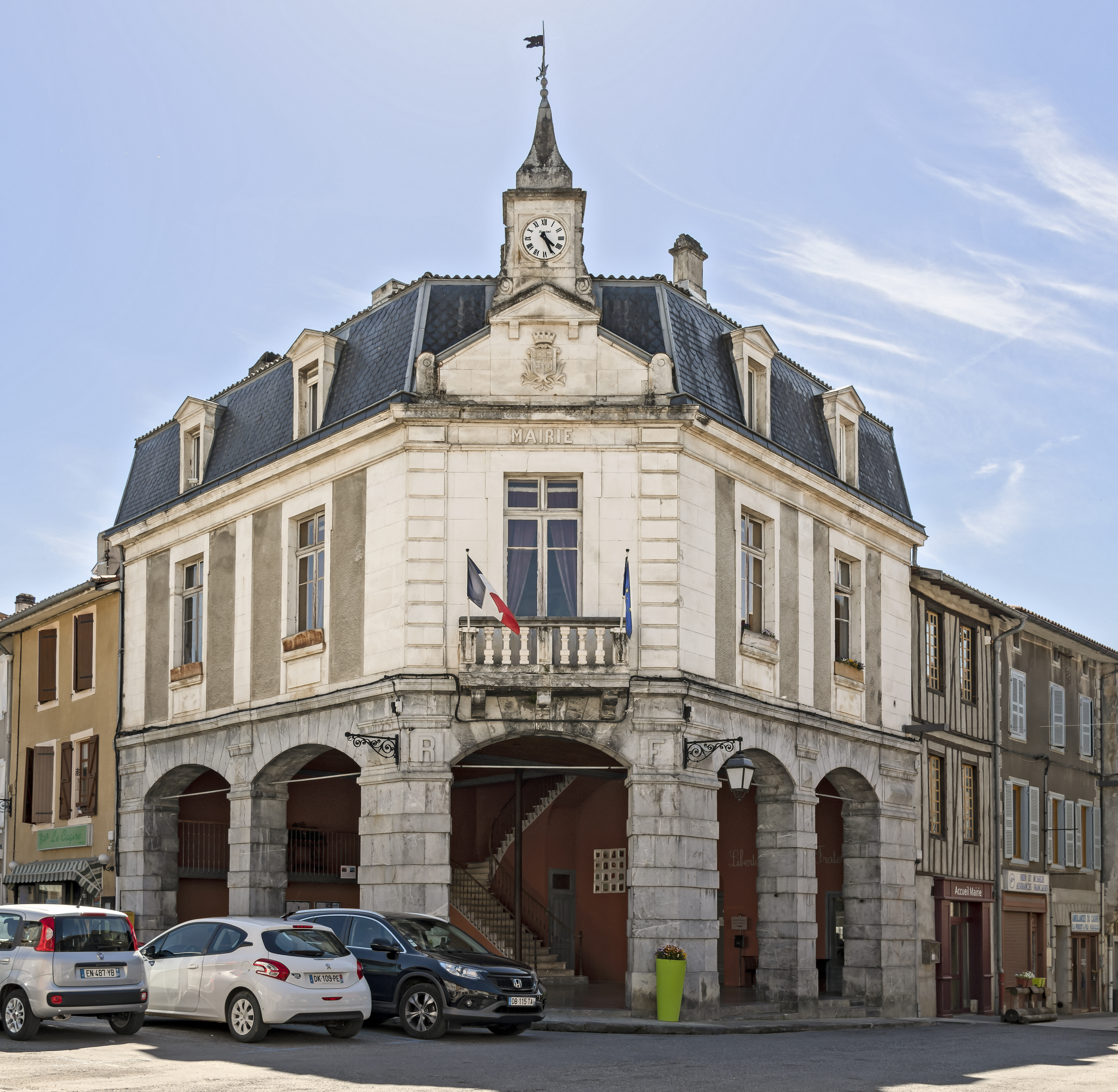
- Town hall of Aspet

- Coat of arms
- Location of Aspet
- Location within France Location within Occitanie
- Coordinates: 43°00′58″N 0°48′08″E
- Country: France
- Region: Occitania
- Department: Haute-Garonne
- Arrondissement: Saint-Gaudens
- Canton: Bagnères-de-Luchon
- Intercommunality: CC Cagire Garonne Salat

Government
  - Mayor (2020–2026): Jean-Sébastien Billaud-Chaoui
- Area^{1}: 26.37 km^{2} (10.18 sq mi)
- Elevation: 470 m (1,540 ft)
- Highest elevation: 1,240 m (4,070 ft)
- Lowest elevation: 399 m (1,309 ft)
- Population (2023): 907
  - Density: 34.4/km^{2} (89.1/sq mi)
- Time zone: UTC+01:00 (CET)
  - Summer (DST): UTC+02:00 (CEST)
- INSEE/Postal code: 31020 /31160
- ^{1} French Land Register data, which excludes lakes, ponds, glaciers > 1 km^{2} (0.386 sq mi or 247 acres) and river estuaries.

Aspet (French pronunciation: [aspɛ]; Occitan: Aspèth) is a commune in the Haute-Garonne department in southwestern France.

== Gallery ==
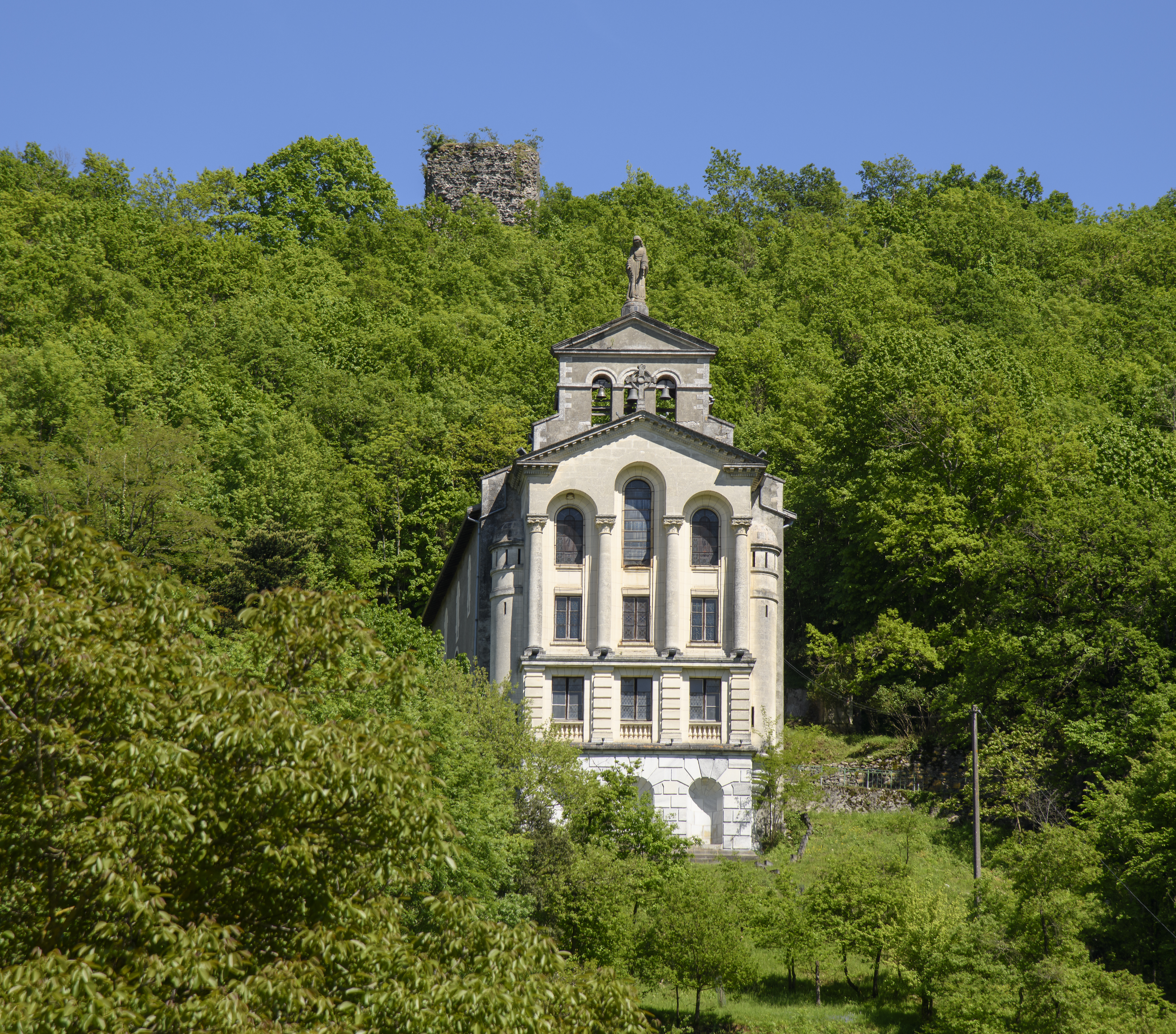
Chapel of Miègecoste and the medieval tower of Chucaou

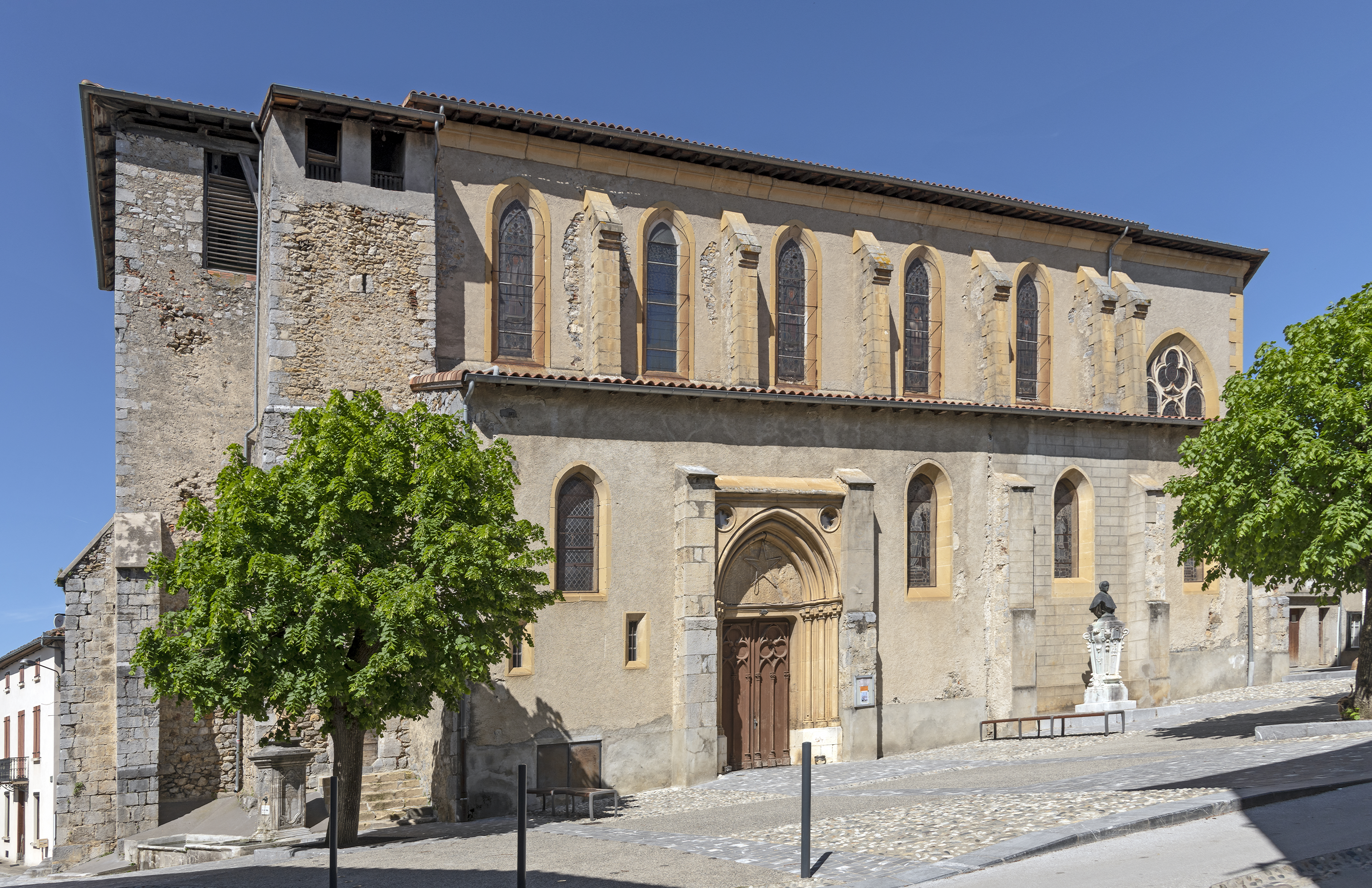
Saint Martin's church

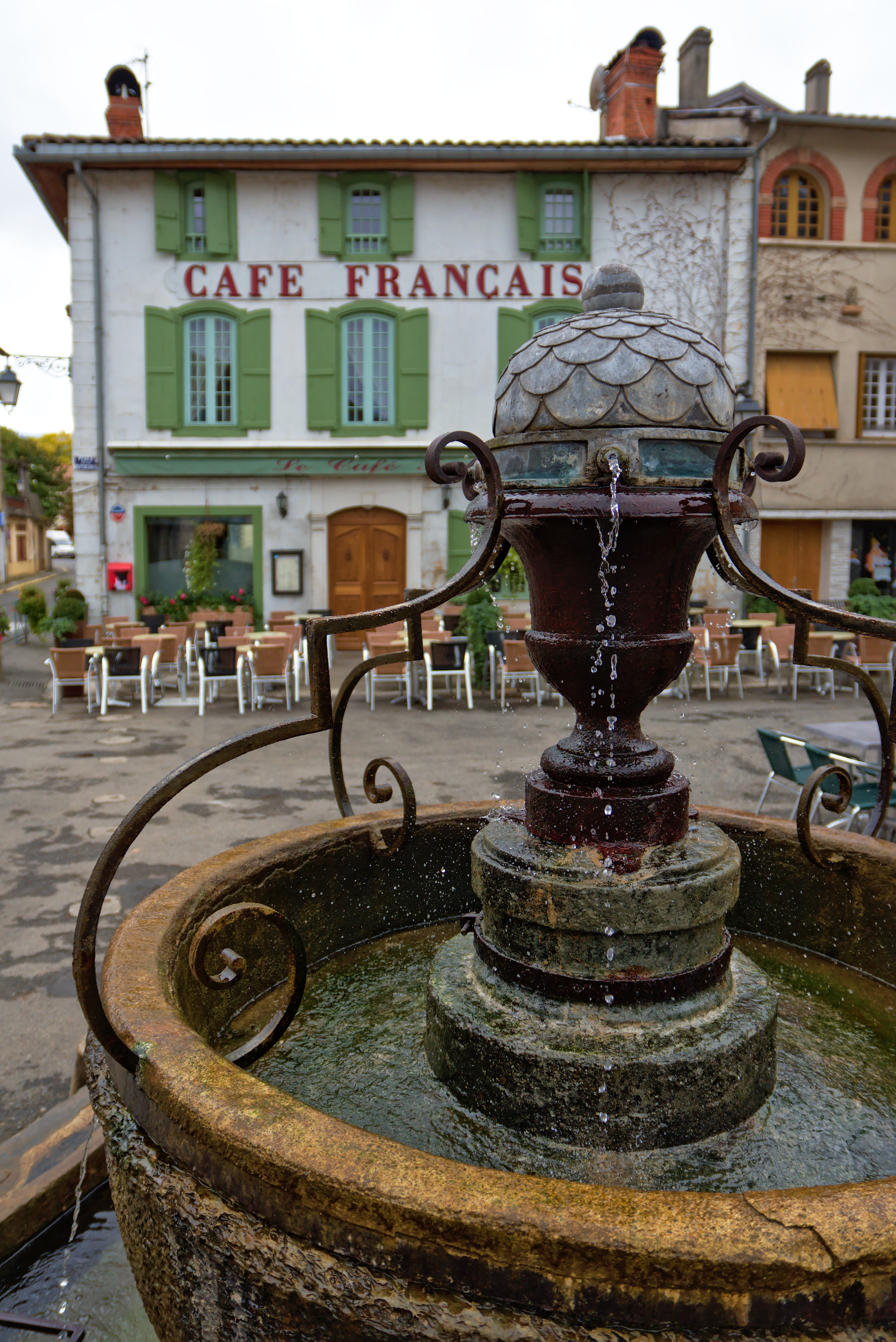
The fountain (monument historique).

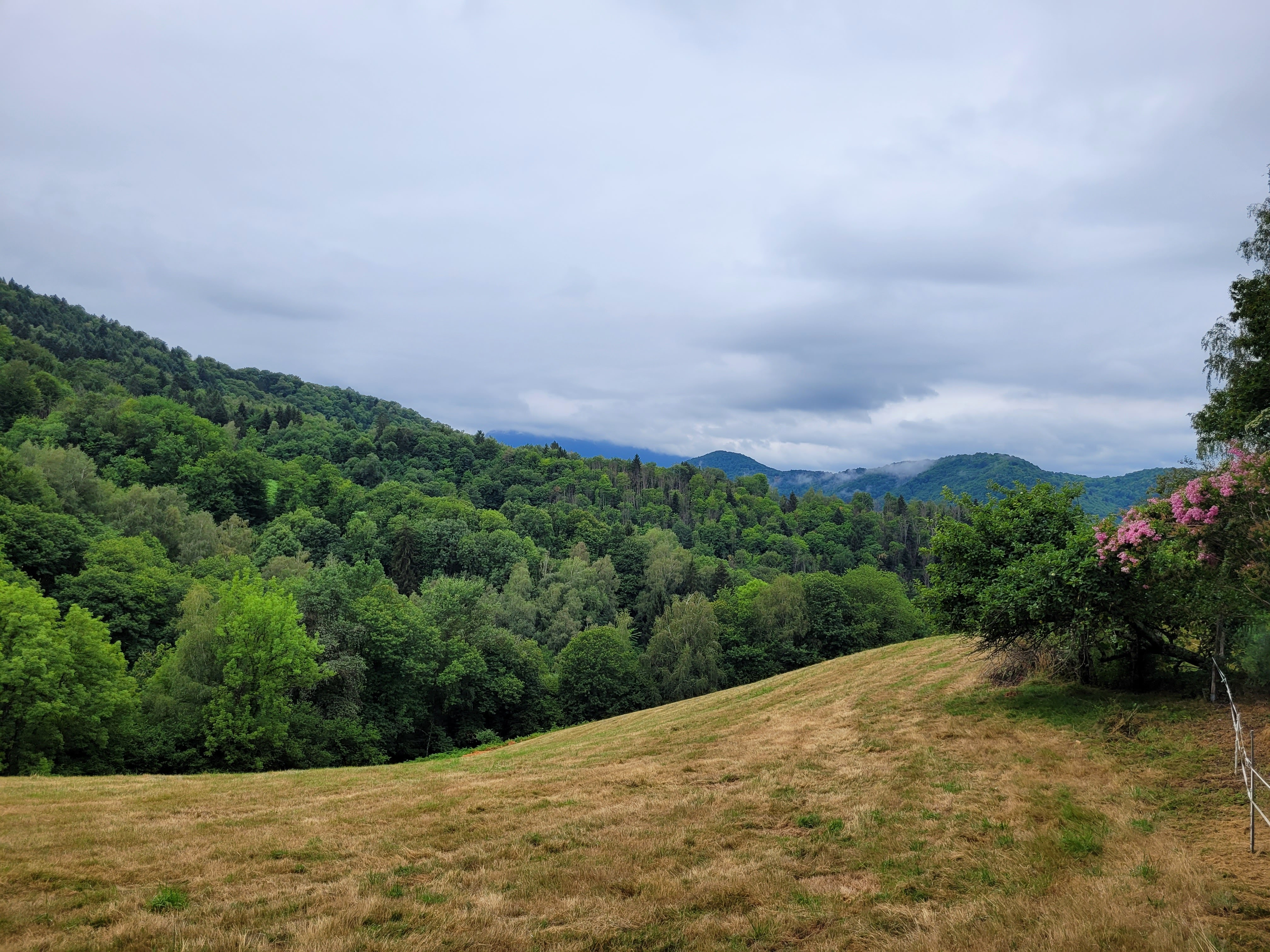
View from artist Ray Atkins' house

== Geography ==
Located in the middle of the Pyrenees mountain chain, within the ancient region of Comminges, Aspet sits 15 km south to Saint-Gaudens and at the foot of the Cagire (1,912 metres (6,273 ft) in Altitude).

== Toponymy ==
According to some, the name Aspet comes from the Basque language where azpeta means at the cliff's foot. The only issue is that there are no cliffs to be seen in Aspet as the landscape is mainly made of rolling hills.

The first document stating the existence of the town was found in 1068 and states its name as « Spel » or « Espel ».

== History ==
The exact date of the creation of the Seigneurie (lordship) d'Aspet is not known. The first lord able to be named is Ramon-At(hon) ruling there around 1068.

Names of several lords who took part in the Crusades have also been found such as Arnaud II, who left with Philippe-Auguste from Genoa in 1190.

At the beginning of the 15th century, the Coarraze family takes the lead of the territory. Raymond-Arnaud II de Coarraze fought with Joan of Arc during the Siege of Orléans. The last representative of the Coarraze name was dame Catherine, who supposedly commissioned the fountain we can still admire on the town's main square. She died in 1492, leaving the leadership to the County of Foix which had Henri III de Navarre as last baron, the soon to be king Henri IV of France. Under his reign, Aspet and its surroundings became part of the royal territories. Thus, in the main street of Aspet (Grand-rue), which leads to the church, are to be found the remains of the Royal Judges House.

== Population ==
Historical population
Year	Pop.	±% p.a.
1968	1,186	—
1975	1,229	+0.51%
1982	962	−3.44%
1990	986	+0.31%
1999	923	−0.73%
2007	938	+0.20%
2012	951	+0.28%
2017	879	−1.56%
2023	907	+0.52%
Source: INSEE

== See also ==
- Communes of the Haute-Garonne department
