= New Zealand dollar =

Currency of New Zealand

New Zealand dollar (English); tāra o Aotearoa (Māori); $NZ
$100 banknote, obverse
$1 coin, depicting a kiwi on the reverse

ISO 4217
- Code: NZD (numeric: 554)
- Subunit: 0.01

Units of account
- Base unit: dollar
- Plural: dollars
- Symbol: $
- Nickname: kiwi
- Subunit
- 1/100: cent
- Plural
- cent: cents
- Symbol
- cent: c

Denominations
- Banknotes
- Freq. used: $5, $10, $20, $50, $100
- Coins
- Freq. used: 10c, 20c, 50c, $1, $2

Demographics
- Date of introduction: 10 July 1967; 59 years ago
- Replaced: New Zealand pound
- User(s): New Zealand (including Tokelau); Cook Islands; Niue; Pitcairn Islands (British Overseas Territory)

Issuance
- Central bank: Reserve Bank of New Zealand
- Website: rbnz.govt.nz
- Printer: Note Printing Australia (provides base polymer note material)
- Website: noteprinting.com
- Mint: Primarily Royal Canadian Mint and Royal Mint (UK), others previously

Valuation
- Inflation: 3.7% (New Zealand only)
- Source: Reserve Bank of New Zealand, September 2026
- Pegged by: Cook Islands dollar (historical), Niue dollar and Pitcairn Islands dollar (all at par)

The New Zealand dollar (Māori: tāra o Aotearoa; sign: $; code: NZD) is the official currency and legal tender of New Zealand. It is used in New Zealand, including Tokelau, as well as in the Cook Islands and Niue (which are both in free association with New Zealand) and in the Pitcairn Islands (a British overseas territory).

Its base unit is the dollar, each divided into 100 cents. Internationally, the abbreviations "$NZ" or "NZ$" are used when necessary to distinguish it from other currencies, particularly the Australian dollar. The dollar was introduced in 1967, replacing New Zealand pound.

Currently, the denominations in circulation are five coins and five banknotes with the smallest being the 10-cent coin; smaller denominations have been discontinued due to inflation and production costs. In the context of currency trading, the New Zealand dollar is sometimes informally called the "Kiwi" or "Kiwi dollar", since the flightless bird, the kiwi, is depicted on its one-dollar coin. It is the tenth most traded currency in the world, representing 2.1% of global foreign exchange market daily turnover in 2019.

== History ==
=== Introduction ===
Prior to the introduction of the New Zealand dollar in 1967, the New Zealand pound was the currency of New Zealand, which had been distinct from the pound sterling since 1933. The pound used the £sd system, in which the pound was divided into 20 shillings and one shilling was divided into 12 pence, a system which by the 1950s was considered complicated and cumbersome.

Switching to decimal currency had been proposed in New Zealand since the 1930s, although only in the 1950s did any plans come to fruition. In 1957, a committee was set up by the Government to investigate decimal currency. The idea fell on fertile ground, and in 1963, the Government decided to decimalise New Zealand currency. The Decimal Currency Act was passed in 1964, setting the date of transition to 10 July 1967. Words such as "fern", "kiwi" and "zeal" were proposed to avoid confusion with the word "dollar", which many people associate with the United States dollar. In the end, the word "dollar" was chosen anyway, and an anthropomorphic dollar note cartoon character called "Mr. Dollar" became the symbol of transition in a huge publicity campaign.

On Monday 10 July 1967 ("Decimal Currency Day"), the New Zealand dollar was introduced to replace the pound at a rate of two dollars to one pound (one dollar to ten shillings, ten cents to one shilling, 5/6 cent to a penny). Some 27 million new banknotes were printed and 165 million new coins were minted for the changeover.

=== Exchange rate ===
The New Zealand dollar was initially pegged to both the British pound sterling and the United States dollar at NZ$1 = UK£1/2 = US$1.40. On 21 November 1967 sterling was devalued from UK£1 = US$2.80 to US$2.40 (see Bretton Woods system), but the New Zealand dollar was devalued even more from NZ$1 = US$1.40 to US$1.12, to match the value of the Australian dollar.

In 1971, the US devalued its dollar relative to gold, leading New Zealand on 23 December 1971 to peg its dollar at US$1.1952, keeping the same gold value. From 9 July 1973 to 4 March 1985 the dollar's value was determined from a trade-weighted basket of currencies.

On 4 March 1985, the NZ$ was floated at the initial rate of US$0.4444. Since then, the dollar's value has been determined by the financial markets, and has been in the range of about US$0.39 to 0.88.

The dollar's post-float low was US$0.3922 on 22 November 2000, and it reached a post-float high on 9 July 2014 of US$0.8821. Much of this medium-term variation in the exchange rate has been attributed to differences in interest rates.

The New Zealand dollar is among the 10 most-traded currencies.

On 11 June 2007, the Reserve Bank sold an unknown worth of New Zealand dollars for nine billion USD in an attempt to drive down its value. This is the first intervention in the markets by the Bank since the float in 1985.

Two suspected interventions followed, but they were not as successful as the first: the first appeared to be initially effective, with the dollar dropping to approximately US$0.7490 from near US$0.7620. However, within little more than a month it had risen to new post-float highs, reaching US$0.8103 on 23 July 2007.

After reaching its post-float record high in early 2008, the value of the NZ$ plummeted throughout much of the 2nd half of 2008 and the first quarter of 2009 as a response to the global economic downturn and flight by investors away from "riskier" currencies such as the NZ$. The NZ$ bottomed out at approximately US$0.50 on 6 March 2009. However, it rebounded strongly as the year progressed, reaching the US$0.75 range by November 2009.

By late 2012, the dollar was holding above 80 US cents, occasionally reaching 85¢, prompting calls from the Green Party for quantitative easing. Unions also called on the Government and the Reserve Bank to take action, but as of February 2013 both had declined.

As of early June 2017, the NZD was trading at approximately US$0.71, and in early November 2019 it was valued as US$0.63 = NZ$1.

== Coins ==
=== History ===
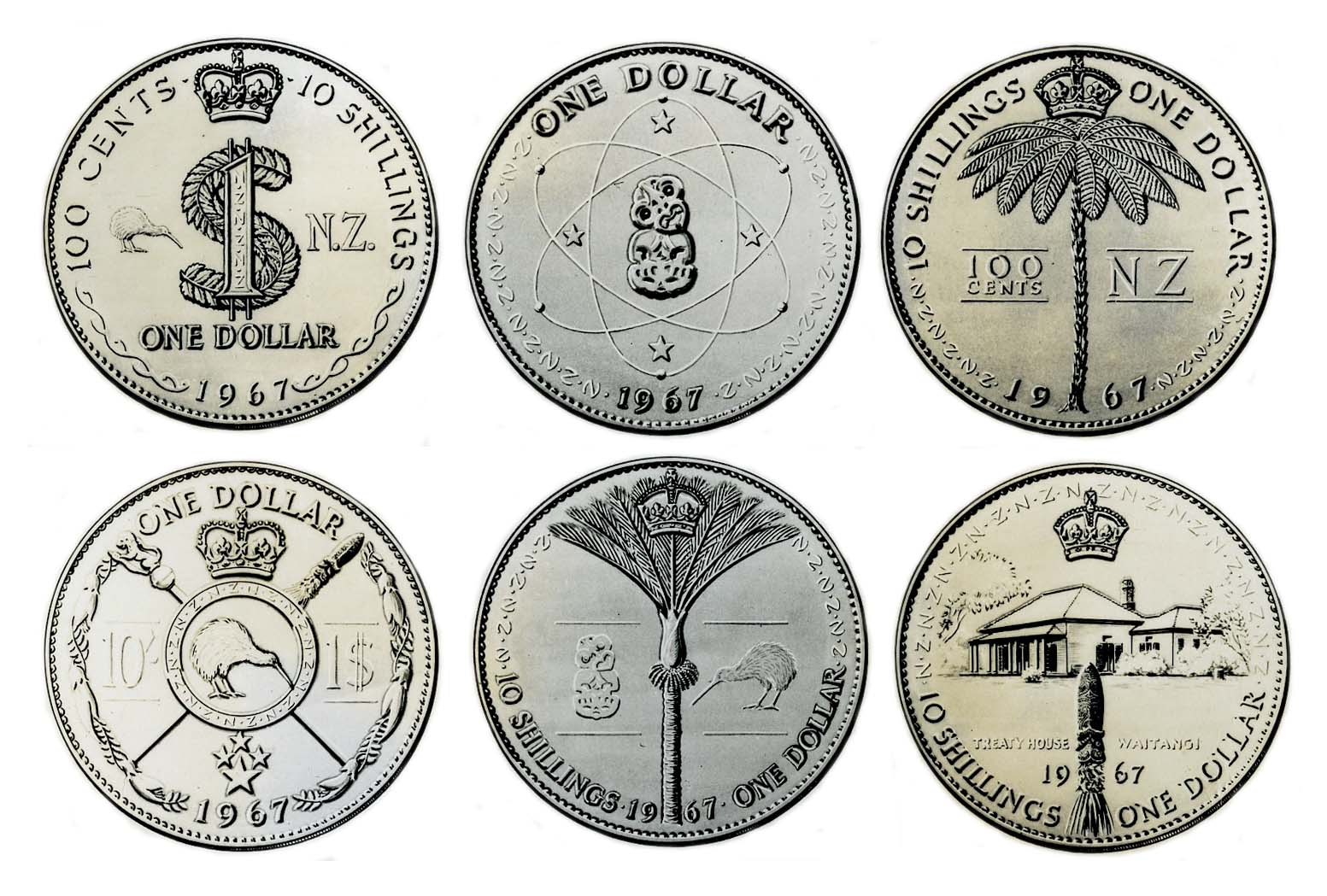
Proposed designs for a $1 (10 shilling) coin

On the introduction of the dollar, coins came in denominations of 1c, 2c, 5c, 10c, 20c, and 50c. The 1c and 2c coins were bronze, the others were cupro-nickel. To ease transition, the 5c, 10c, and 20c were the same size as the sixpence, shilling and florin (2s) that they respectively replaced, and the 50c was the same size as the half-crown (2½s) but equivalent to twice its value. Until 1970, the ten-cent coin bore the additional legend ONE SHILLING. The obverse designs of all the coins featured Arnold Machin's portrait of Queen Elizabeth II, with the legend ELIZABETH II NEW ZEALAND [YEAR]. The reverse sides of coins introduced in 1967 did not follow the designs that were originally intended for them. Those modern art and sculpture themed designs were leaked to a newspaper and met a very negative public reaction. The final releases were given more conservative designs in line with public expectations.

In 1986, New Zealand adopted Raphael Maklouf's new portrait of the Queen. The 1c and 2c coins were last minted for circulation in 1987, with collector coins being made for 1988. The coins were demonetised on 30 April 1990. The lack of 1c and 2c coins meant that cash transactions were normally rounded to the nearest 5c (10c from 2006), a process known as Swedish rounding.

On 11 February 1991, aluminium-bronze $1 and $2 coins were introduced to replace existing $1 and $2 notes. In 1999, Ian Rank-Broadley's portrait of the Queen was introduced and the legend rearranged to read NEW ZEALAND ELIZABETH II.

On 11 November 2004, the Reserve Bank announced that it proposed to take the 5c coin out of circulation and to make the 50c, 20c and 10c coins smaller and use plated steel to make them lighter. After a three-month public submission period that ended on 4 February 2005, the Reserve Bank announced on 31 March 2005 that it would go ahead with the proposed changes. The changeover period started on 31 July 2006, with the old coins usable until 31 October 2006. The old 50c, 20c, 10c and 5c pieces are now no longer legal tender, but they are still redeemable at the Reserve Bank. Prior to the change over, these coins were similar, save for the legend and reverse artwork, to international (mainly Commonwealth) coins of the same British-derived sizes, which led to coins from other currencies, particularly older coins, being accepted by vending machines and many retailers.

Commemorative coins, with face values of 50c, were issued in 2015 and 2018 to mark the centenary of the Gallipoli landings and of Armistice Day.

=== Current circulating coins ===
Image	Value	Technical Parameters				Description			Date of Issue
Reverse	Value	Diameter	Thickness	Mass	Composition	Edge	Reverse	Obverse	Date of Issue
10 cent NZD coin reverse	10c	20.50 mm	1.58 mm	3.30 g	Copper-plated steel	Plain	Queen Elizabeth II	A Māori koruru, or carved head	31 July 2006
20 cent NZD coin reverse	20c	21.75 mm	1.56 mm	4.00 g	Nickel-plated steel	"Spanish flower"	Queen Elizabeth II	Māori carving of Pukaki, a chief of the Ngati Whakaue iwi between traditional koru kowhaiwhai patterns	31 July 2006
50 cent NZD coin reverse	50c	24.75 mm	1.70 mm	5.00 g	Nickel-plated steel	Plain	Queen Elizabeth II	HM Bark Endeavour and Mount Taranaki	31 July 2006
1 dollar NZD coin reverse	$1	23.00 mm	2.74 mm	8 g	Aluminium bronze	Intermittent milling	Queen Elizabeth II	Kiwi and silver fern	11 February 1991
2 dollar NZD coin reverse	$2	26.50 mm	2.70 mm	10 g	Aluminium bronze	Grooved	Queen Elizabeth II	Kotuku (great egret)	11 February 1991
These images are to scale at 2.5 pixels per millimetre. For table standards, see the coin specification table.

After the death of Queen Elizabeth II in September 2022, the Reserve Bank said it would exhaust its existing coin stocks before introducing new coins featuring King Charles III. The first coins featuring a new obverse effigy of Charles III will be the 2024 ten cent coins, beginning circulation in 2027.

== Banknotes ==
=== History ===
In 1967, notes were introduced in denominations of $1, $2, $5, $10, $20 and $100. All except the $5 replaced their pound predecessors at two dollars to the pound, with each denomination issued in the same colour as the pound note they replaced, to aid cash-handling during the transition.

The original series of dollar notes featured on the obverse a portrait of Queen Elizabeth II wearing Queen Alexandra's Kokoshnik tiara, King George's VI festoon necklace, and Queen Mary's floret earrings, while the reverse featured native birds and plants. The notes were changed slightly in 1981 due to a change of printer (from De La Rue to Bradbury, Wilkinson & Co.)—the most noticeable difference being the portrait based upon a photograph by Peter Grugeon, in which Queen Elizabeth II is wearing Grand Duchess Vladimir's tiara and Queen Victoria's golden jubilee necklace. The $50 note was added in 1983 to fill the long gap between the $20 and the $100 notes. $1 and $2 notes were discontinued in 1991 after being replaced with coins.

A new series of notes, known as Series 5 was introduced in 1992. The obverse of each note featured a notable New Zealander, while the reverse featured a native New Zealand bird and New Zealand scenery. The Queen remained on the $20 note. In 1999, series 6 polymer notes replaced the paper notes. The designs remained much the same, but were changed slightly to accommodate new security features, with the most obvious changes being the two transparent windows.

In 2015–16, new Series 7 notes were issued, refreshing the note design and improving security features. As of 2021, Series 6 and 7 notes are currently legal tender.

In September 2022, following the death of Queen Elizabeth II, the Reserve Bank said it would exhaust its existing stocks of $20 notes before introducing new notes featuring King Charles III.

=== Current circulating banknotes ===
The most recent issue of New Zealand banknotes is the seventh series, first released in October 2015 and May 2016.

Image	Value	Dimensions	Main Colour	Description			Date of Issue
Obverse	Value	Dimensions	Main Colour	Obverse	Reverse	Watermark	Date of Issue
	$5	135 × 66 mm	Orange	Edmund Hillary; Aoraki / Mount Cook	Campbell Island scene Hoiho (yellow-eyed penguin); Bulbinella rossii (Ross lily); Pleurophyllum speciosum (Campbell Island daisy); Bull kelp	Elizabeth II	October 2015
	$10	140 × 68 mm	Blue	Kate Sheppard; White camellia flowers	River scene Whio (blue duck); Parahebe catarractae Blechnum fern	Elizabeth II	October 2015
	$20	145 × 70 mm	Green	Elizabeth II; New Zealand Parliament Buildings	New Zealand alpine scene Kārearea (New Zealand falcon); Marlborough rock daisy Red tussock in flower Mount Tapuae-O-Uenuku	Elizabeth II	May 2016
	$50	150 × 72 mm	Purple	Āpirana Ngata; Porourangi Meeting House	Conifer broadleaf forest scene Kōkako (blue wattled crow); Supplejack (kareao); Sky-blue mushroom	Elizabeth II	May 2016
	$100	155 × 74 mm	Red	Ernest Rutherford; Nobel Prize medal	Beech forest scene Mohua (yellowhead); Red beech South Island lichen moth	Elizabeth II	May 2016
These images are to scale at 0.7 pixel per millimetre (18 pixel per inch). For table standards, see the banknote specification table. For details of the circulating series 6 designs, see Banknotes of the New Zealand dollar.

== In foreign exchange markets ==
=== History ===
With the breakdown of the Bretton Woods system in 1971, both Australia and New Zealand converted the mostly-fixed foreign exchange regimes to a moving peg against the US dollar. In September 1974, Australia moved to a peg against a basket of currencies called the trade weighted index (TWI) in an effort to reduce fluctuations associated with its peg to the US dollar. The peg to the TWI was changed to a moving peg in November 1976, causing the actual value of the peg to be periodically adjusted.

=== Current exchange rates ===
Current NZD exchange rates
From Google Finance:	AUD CAD CHF CNY EUR GBP HKD JPY USD KRW SGD JPY
From Yahoo! Finance:	AUD CAD CHF CNY EUR GBP HKD JPY USD KRW SGD JPY
From XE.com:	AUD CAD CHF CNY EUR GBP HKD JPY USD KRW SGD JPY
From OANDA:	AUD CAD CHF CNY EUR GBP HKD JPY USD KRW SGD JPY

=== In currency trading ===
The New Zealand dollar contributes greatly to the total global exchange market—far in excess of New Zealand's relative share of population or global GDP.

According to the Bank for International Settlements, the New Zealand dollar's share of global foreign exchange market daily turnover in 2016 was 2.1% (up from 1.6% in 2010) giving it a rank of 11th. Trading in the currency has climbed steadily since the same survey in 1998 when the NZD's ranking was 17th and the share of turnover was just 0.2%.

Most traded currencies by value Currency distribution of global foreign exchange market turnover
Currency	ISO 4217 code	Proportion of daily volume		Change (2022–2025)
Currency	ISO 4217 code	April 2022	April 2025	Change (2022–2025)
United States dollar	USD	88.4%	89.2%	▲0.8pp
Euro	EUR	30.6%	28.9%	▼1.7pp
Japanese yen	JPY	16.7%	16.8%	▲0.1pp
Pound sterling	GBP	12.9%	10.2%	▼2.7pp
Renminbi	CNY	7.0%	8.5%	▲1.5pp
Swiss franc	CHF	5.2%	6.4%	▲1.2pp
Australian dollar	AUD	6.4%	6.1%	▼0.3pp
Canadian dollar	CAD	6.2%	5.8%	▼0.4pp
Hong Kong dollar	HKD	2.6%	3.8%	▲1.2pp
Singapore dollar	SGD	2.4%	2.4%	Steady
Indian rupee	INR	1.6%	1.9%	▲0.3pp
South Korean won	KRW	1.8%	1.8%	Steady
Swedish krona	SEK	2.2%	1.6%	▼0.6pp
Mexican peso	MXN	1.5%	1.6%	▲0.1pp
New Zealand dollar	NZD	1.7%	1.5%	▼0.2pp
Norwegian krone	NOK	1.7%	1.3%	▼0.4pp
New Taiwan dollar	TWD	1.1%	1.2%	▲0.1pp
Brazilian real	BRL	0.9%	0.9%	Steady
South African rand	ZAR	1.0%	0.8%	▼0.2pp
Polish złoty	PLN	0.7%	0.8%	▲0.1pp
Danish krone	DKK	0.7%	0.7%	Steady
Indonesian rupiah	IDR	0.4%	0.7%	▲0.3pp
Turkish lira	TRY	0.4%	0.5%	▲0.1pp
Thai baht	THB	0.4%	0.5%	▲0.1pp
Israeli new shekel	ILS	0.4%	0.4%	Steady
Hungarian forint	HUF	0.3%	0.4%	▲0.1pp
Czech koruna	CZK	0.4%	0.4%	Steady
Chilean peso	CLP	0.3%	0.3%	Steady
Philippine peso	PHP	0.2%	0.2%	Steady
Colombian peso	COP	0.2%	0.2%	Steady
Malaysian ringgit	MYR	0.2%	0.2%	Steady
UAE dirham	AED	0.4%	0.1%	▼0.3pp
Saudi riyal	SAR	0.2%	0.1%	▼0.1pp
Romanian leu	RON	0.1%	0.1%	Steady
Peruvian sol	PEN	0.1%	0.1%	Steady
Other currencies		2.6%	3.4%	▲0.8pp
Total (Note: The total sum is 200% because each currency trade is counted twice: once for the currency being bought and once for the currency being sold. The percentages above represent the proportion of all trades involving a given currency, regardless of which side of the transaction it is on.)		200.0%	200.0%	

== See also ==
- Australian dollar
- Cook Islands dollar
- Economy of New Zealand
- History of Chatham Islands numismatics
- Kauri bond
- Pitcairn Islands dollar
- Postal orders of New Zealand

== Notes ==
Preceded by: New Zealand pound Reason: decimalisation Ratio: 2 dollars = 1 pound	Currency of New Zealand; 10 July 1967 –	Succeeded by: Current
