= 2 cents =

2 cents or two cents may refer to:

== Coins ==
- Australian two-cent coin
- 2 cent euro coin
- New Zealand two-cent coin
- Two-cent piece (United States)

== Other uses ==
- My two cents, an American idiom
- 2Cents, a metal/punk band
- My Two Cents, a fictional news show hosted by Kent Brockman on the American cartoon TV show The Simpsons
- Lesson of the widow's mite, a Biblical story that describes a gift of roughly two cents
- Two Cents, an American educational web series distributed by PBS Digital Studios
- Your Two Cents, a 2019 Canadian web series
- Two Cent Bridge, a bridge in Maine, United States
- Two Cents Worth of Hope, a 1952 film
