= Ray Atkins =

British artist

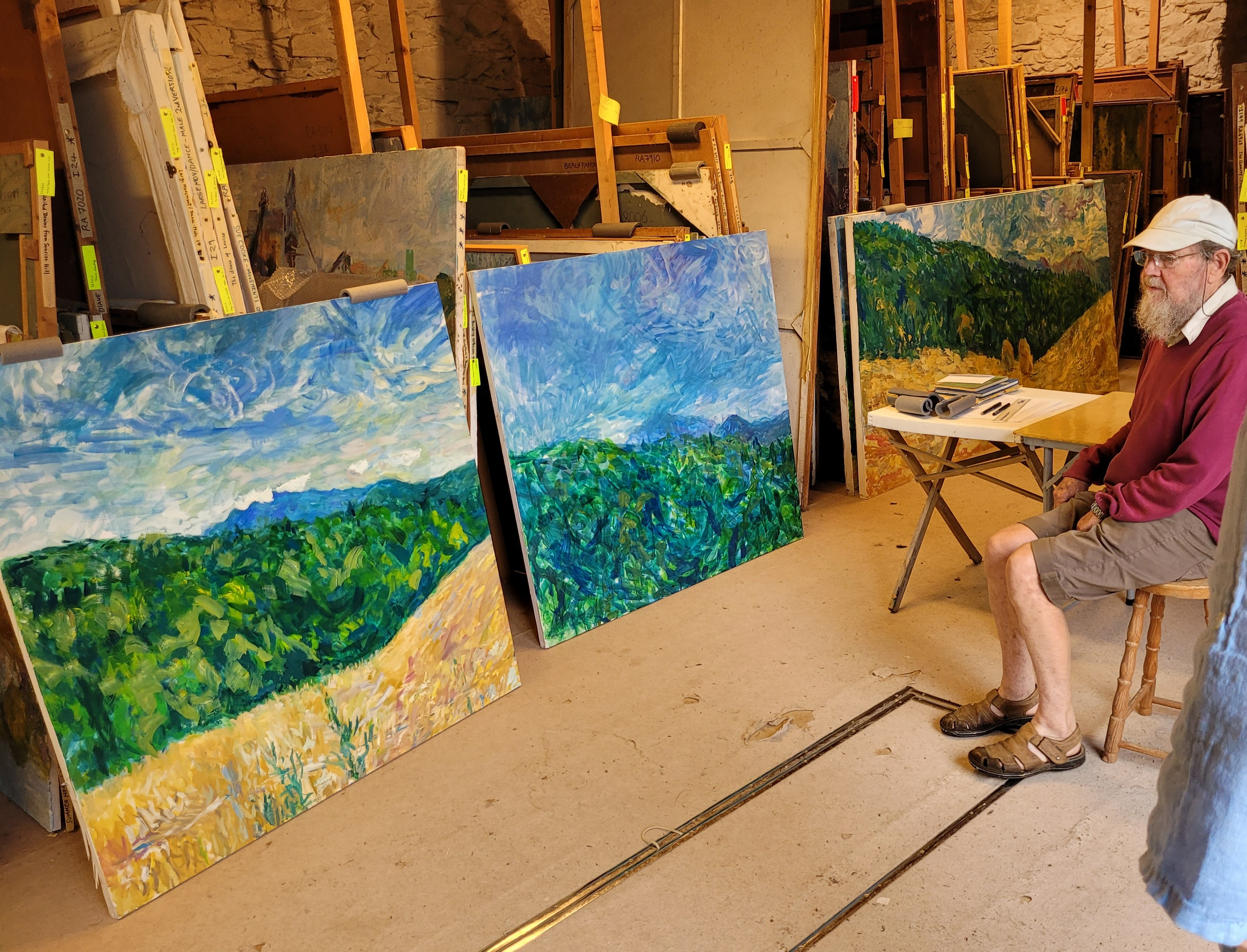
Painter Atkins showing visitors some of his paintings, summer 2022

Ray Atkins is a British figurative artist, member of the St Ives School & the London Group and educator. He was born in 1937 in Exeter, Devon, and studied art at Bromley College of Art and at the Slade School of Fine Art. He is known particularly for his large paintings, painted in situ over a period of weeks or months.

Atkins taught at Bournemouth College of Art from 1965 to 1970, at Reading University’s department of fine art under Claude Rogers and in 1971 at Epsom School of Art. He went on to paint in Cornwall, teaching at Falmouth School of Art. In 2009, he moved to France, where he continues to paint.

== Life and career ==
After graduating from the Slade in 1964, Atkins initially worked in London. He was influenced by the painting of Frank Auerbach, and while he was at the Slade School of Fine Art for postgraduate studies he worked in Auerbach's studio. Before leaving London he completed a series of large paintings of Millwall Dock.

Atkins taught at Bournemouth College of Art from 1965 to 1970. He moved to Reading in 1970 to teach at Reading University's department of fine art, where he worked alongside John Wonnacott. Atkins' style of teaching was to paint alongside the students. Frank Auerbach, who was an occasional visiting tutor at Reading, commented on this in conversation with Atkins: 'I was very impressed by that fact that unlike most teachers [...] you seemed to be spending all your time in the room with the students. Setting an example, the best thing you could do.'

In 1974 he moved to Cornwall, where he taught at Falmouth School of Art. In his own art, he produced a series of paintings of the industrial heritage of Cornwall: old mines, quarries and the open cast china clay pits around St Austell and on Bodmin Moor. He became a member of the London Group in 1978.

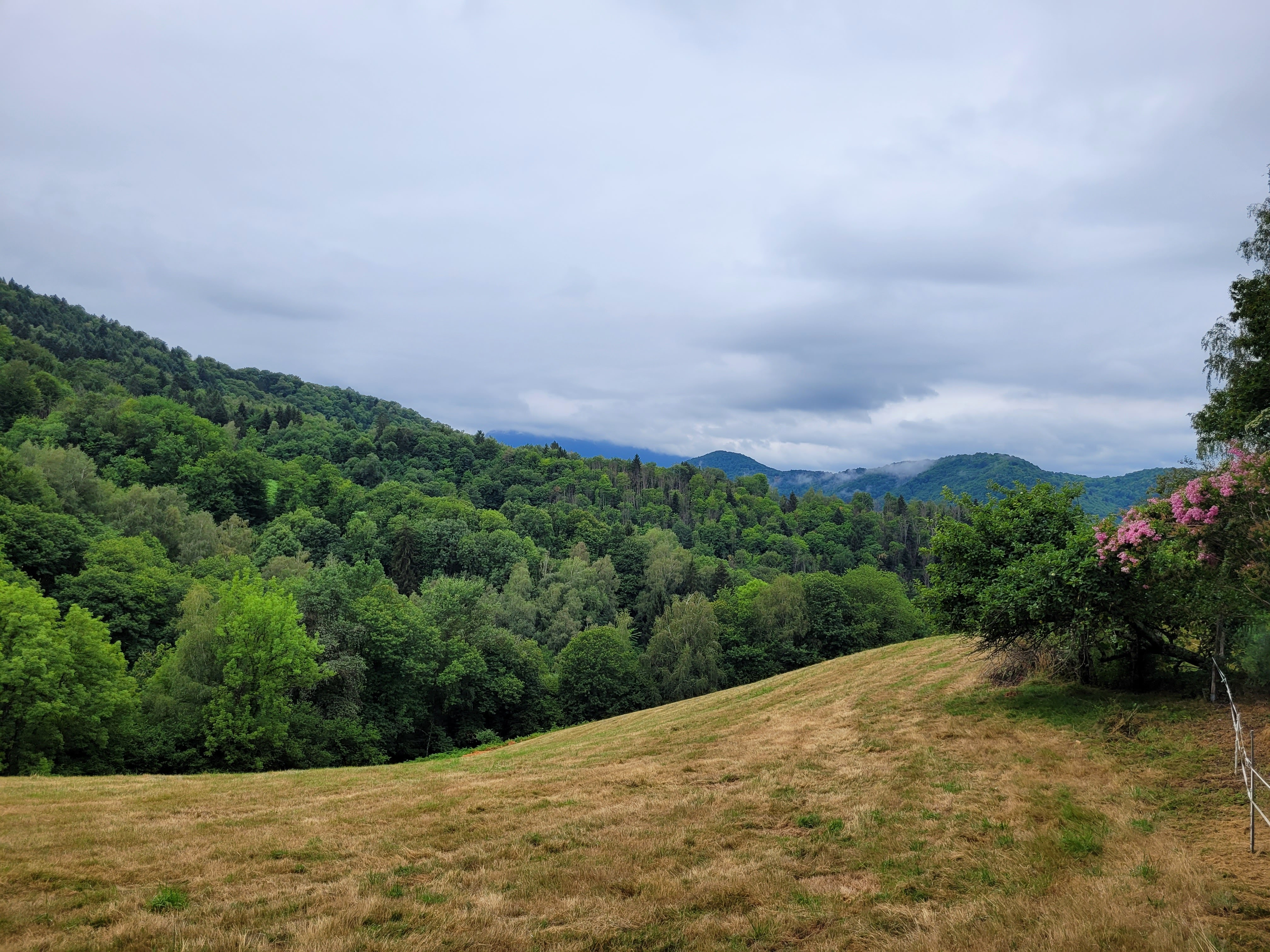
View with forest from Atkins' garden, near Aspet, France, often the subject of his paintings

In 2009 Atkins relocated, with his partner dancer and choreographer Hsiao Hwa Li, to a remote farmstead near Aspet, Haute-Garonne in the foothills of the French Pyrenees.

== Style and influences ==
Atkins typically creates a painting over a period of weeks or months. "In a sense, my paintings are the opposite of Impressionism. My paintings are often constructed over a fairly long timescale of a few days to a few months. It is by the accumulation of several moments, from my observations over a long period and the work of the material that I recreate a new situation, the sensation of the moment”.

While at Reading, Atkins started to work on gigantic paintings out of doors, painting close to the River Thames. "I was reading about Le Corbusier, about how he wanted all his buildings to have a human measurement, and I thought painting should have this connection with the human body as well and so I decided to do a six foot square picture. He found a suitable site at Milwall Dock and obtained permission from the Port of London Authority to paint there. Since that time, Atkins paintings have usually been created on-site, and are often on a monumental scale. As Leon Kossoff wrote in 2003: "Ray Atkins uses the outside world as a studio. The landscapes emerge from day to day involvement with an ever changing subject which is finally committed to a specific visual experience. I have admired these extraordinary paintings for many years."

After moving to Cornwall, he developed his method of painting on large scale from direct observation of the landscape, leaving the works were left in situ until finished. He sets up his boards, often up to three metres wide and weighing fifty kilograms, in front of the landscape, fixing the work to the ground securely and leaving them in place over a period of weeks as works in progress.

== Collections ==
Atkins' works can be found in many public and private collections, including the British Council, the Arts Council of England, the British Museum, the Newlyn Art Gallery and Reading University's collection.

== Exhibitions ==
=== Solo exhibitions ===
- 1970: Piers Morris Gallery, London
- 1974: Whitechapel Art Gallery
- 1977: Newlyn Art Gallery
- 1983: Royal Institution of Cornwall, Truro
- 1985: Galerie Leisten und Thiesen, Munster, Germany
- 1988: Eurogallery, London
- 1989: New Paintings Art Space Gallery, London
- 1991: New Paintings Art Space Gallery, London
- 1993: New Paintings Art Space Gallery, London
- 1995: New Paintings Art Space Gallery, London
- 1996: Ray Atkins retrospective, Art Space Gallery, London
- 1996: Ray Atkins retrospective, Royal West of England Academy, Bristol
- 1997: Kilkenny Arts Week, Kilkenny Castle Ireland, (invited artist)
- 1998: New Paintings, Art Space Gallery, London
- 1999: Ray Atkins and the Figure, Art Space Gallery, London
- 2001: Broken Ground, Wheal Jane mine, Truro (in collaboration with poet Peter Redgrove and composer Paul Hancock)
- 2001: Rhythm of the Seasons, Art Space Gallery, London
- 2003: Paintings 2003, Art Space Gallery, London
- 2005: Paintings 2005, Art Space Gallery, London
- 2007: Paintings and Drawings 2007, Art Space Gallery, London
- 2009: Aspet s'Expose (invité d'honneur), Aspet, Haute- PaintingsGaronne, France
- 2011: Ray Atkins: The Long View: from Cornwall to the Pyrenees, Art Space Gallery, London and touring:
- 2012: Ray Atkins: The Long View: from Cornwall to the Pyrenees, Dean Clough Art Gallery, Halifax, West Yorkshire
- 2014: Jean Marmignon Theatre Gallery, St Gaudens, France
- 2015: At the Forest's Edge Art Space Gallery, London
- 2016: The Reading Years Reading Museum, Reading, UK
- 2026: Ray Atkins Unseen West Gallery, Mall Galleries, London

=== Selected group exhibitions ===
- 1961 onwards: London Group exhibitions.
- 1964: Young Contemporaries
- 1968: From Life, Camden Arts Centre
- 1974: British Painting '74, Hayward Gallery, London
- 1978: Newlyn Society at Pont Aven, Brittany, France
- 1982: Summer Show I, Serpentine Gallery, London
- 1983: Cleveland International Drawing Biennale
- 1984: Dortmund Art Fair, Germany
- 1985: Royal Society of British Artists(invited artist), Mall Galleries, London
- 1986: Twentieth Century British Artists and the Sea, Laing Art Gallery, Newcastle
- 1989: Salute to Turner, Agnew's, London
- 1995: Royal Academy summer exhibition
- 2001: The London Group at the Walk
- 2005: Tree-Mendous, Falmouth Art Gallery
- 2011: Flashback, Art Space Gallery, London

== Bibliography ==
Buckman David, (2006), Artists in Britain since 1945, Vol 2, Art Dictionaries Ltd, Bristol
