= New Zealand fifty-cent coin =

50 cent coin of New Zealand

Fifty cents
- New Zealand
- Value: 0.50 New Zealand dollars
- Mass: 5.00 g
- Diameter: 24.75 mm
- Thickness: 1.70 mm
- Edge: Plain
- Composition: nickel-plated steel
- Years of minting: 1967 – present
- Catalog number: –

Obverse
- Design: Elizabeth II, Queen of New Zealand
- Designer: Ian Rank-Broadley
- Design date: 1999

Reverse
- Design: Captain Cook's HMS Endeavour near Mount Taranaki
- Designer: Reginald George James Berry
- Design date: 1967

The New Zealand fifty-cent coin is a coin of the New Zealand dollar. It was the largest by denomination, diameter and mass to have been introduced on the decimalisation of the currency on 10 July 1967, replacing the pre-decimal crown coin (five shillings). A total of 81,585,200 pre-2006 50 cent coins were issued, with a total value of $40,792,600.00.

On 31 July 2006, as part of a revision of New Zealand's coinage, the fifty cent was made smaller, lighter and of a cheaper alloy (nickel-plated steel). On 1 November of that year the previous larger fifty cent coin was demonetised.

Both the larger and smaller coin featured on its reverse the ship HMS Endeavour on which Captain Cook became the first Briton to reach New Zealand, in October 1769. The obverse, as per all New Zealand coins, features the reigning monarch, which throughout the coin's mintage has only been Queen Elizabeth II.

== History ==
=== Larger coin ===
Following a 1959 committee, it was agreed in 1963 that New Zealand would use decimal currency. In 1964, the denominations, designs, weights and diameters of the coins were confirmed in the Decimal Currency Act. The decimal dollar replaced the New Zealand pound (pegged to the British pound) at the rate of two dollars per pound. The pre-decimal progenitor of the fifty-cent coin was the five-shilling crown, a coin that throughout the British Empire was not widely used (the New Zealand crown was only issued in 1935, 1949 and 1953 with a total of 458,148 specimens). The fifty-cent coin used the five shilling value of the crown, but used the dimensions, weight and composition of the smaller half-crown (2½ shillings).

The original fifty-cent coin which circulated between 1967 and 2006 was made of cupro-nickel and had five sections of alternate milling on its edge. At 31.75 mm (1.25 in) diameter and weighing 13.61 g (0.48 oz) it was the largest coin issued of the dollar. From 1967 to 1985 all New Zealand coins featured Arnold Machin's portrait of Queen Elizabeth II on the obverse. James Berry was selected to design the reverse of all of New Zealand's decimal coins, and his fifty cent design featured HMS Endeavour, the ship on which Captain Cook became the first Briton to reach New Zealand in October 1769. Mount Taranaki is seen in the distance and the legend ENDEAVOUR is written on the bottom. The design remains unchanged to the present day.

New Zealand adopted decimal currency on 10 July 1967 and $5,000,000 worth of fifty-cent coins were issued that year. The large amount meant that no further minting occurred until 1971-the longest wait for a second year of production for any of the original decimal coins.

In 1986 the portrait of the Queen was changed to the version by Raphael Maklouf which had been introduced to the coins of the pound sterling in the previous year. This portrait remained on the obverse until the current version by Ian Rank-Broadley was introduced in 1999. However, no 50-cent coins were minted from 1989 to 2000.

=== Smaller coin ===
In 2006, New Zealand revised its coinage. The fifty-cent coin was altered due to its size being larger than most of the world's coins, and therefore being an inconvenience to the public. In 2004, 51% of the public when asked by the Reserve Bank of New Zealand if they supported reducing size of coins agreed to the changes, and the rate grew to 66% when it was revealed that it would save taxpayers' money. The alloy was changed to nickel-plated steel, which saved 25% of minting costs, and the edge was smoothed.

The immediate production of the smaller coin was a face value of NZ$35.1 million (70.2 million coins) and entered circulation on 31 July 2006 alongside the larger coin. The larger coin was withdrawn from circulation on 1 November 2006.

=== Future ===
After the death of Queen Elizabeth II in September 2022, the Reserve Bank said it would exhaust its existing coin stocks before introducing new coins featuring King Charles III. Based on current stock levels, this would likely be several years away.

== Commemoratives ==
In 1969, to mark the bicentennial of Endeavour's arrival to New Zealand, a commemorative version of the fifty cent with the Machin portrait was produced with an inscription on its edge. Since no regular fifty cent coins were issued in 1969 the coin is rare. Estimated mintage; 100,000.

In 1994, a bi-metallic coin of fifty cents was issued to mark the 225th anniversary of Endeavour's arrival. The coin featured the Maklouf portrait and is New Zealand's only ever bimetallic coin.

In 2003 six coins with the Rank-Broadley portrait were released, with images of characters from The Lord of the Rings. The link to New Zealand was that they were directed by New Zealander Peter Jackson. Silver dollars with the characters were also produced.

There are two commemorative 50c coins currently in circulation as legal tender. The first one was released on 23 March 2015. It features the standard obverse design but on the reverse it features two soldiers, one New Zealander and one Australian surrounded by two ferns and a mangopare (hammerhead shark) design; with the words "The Spirit of Anzac We Will Remember Them" and "1915–2015" in reference to the 100th anniversary of the Battle of Gallipoli in 1915. It is the first circulating coin to feature colour, a black background around the soldiers. The coins are limited to 1,000,000 and were minted by the Royal Canadian Mint at Winnipeg.

The second one was released on 1 October 2018. It also features the standard obverse design but on the reverse it features an RSA poppy in the middle, surrounded by a free formed remembrance wreath that has incorporated the silver fern and the koru; with the words "Eleventh Hour of the Eleventh Day of the Eleventh Month". It was issued to commemorate the 100th anniversary of Armistice Day. It is the second circulating coin to feature colour. The coins are limited to 2,000,000 and were minted by the Royal Canadian Mint at Winnipeg.
