= International Year of the Family =

The year 1994 was proclaimed the International Year of the Family by the United Nations General Assembly. Its objectives are promoted by the United Nations Programme on the Family.

This was one of many International observances declared for specific days, months and years.

In October 1994, the United Nations Secretary-General opened the three-day International Conference on Families, saying:

Five years ago, the General Assembly decided that 1994 was to be the International Year of the Family.

At the time, there was no consensus. Some did not see the point of an International Year of the Family. Opinions were divided as to what the Year was about. Some people argued that support for the family discriminates against those who prefer to live outside family units. There were also disagreements over the activities which should be organized to mark the year...

The International Year of the Family has stimulated a worldwide debate. Many political notions have been clarified. Out of the process of debate and reflection have come new insights.

Instead of confusion and hesitation, there is now consensus about the role of the family in human society. Today, a new realism prevails. It is accepted that the family is a fundamental institution of human society. Indeed, it is established that society is a structure made up of families and individuals related to society, in the first instance, through families.
