= New Zealand one-dollar coin =

Current denomination of New Zealand currency

One dollar
- New Zealand
- Value: 1.00 New Zealand dollars
- Mass: 8.00 g
- Diameter: 23.00 mm
- Thickness: 2.74 mm
- Edge: Intermittently milled
- Composition: Copper-Aluminium-Nickel (Cu 92%, Al 6%, Ni 2%)
- Years of minting: 1967–present (Note: Commemorative coins were produced between 1967-1989. Became standard in 1990)
- Catalog number: –

Obverse
- Design: Elizabeth II, Queen of New Zealand
- Designer: Raphael David Maklouf; Ian Rank-Broadley
- Design date: 1986 (RDM); 1999 (IRB)

Reverse
- Design: A kiwi surrounded by silver fern fronds
- Designer: Robert Maurice Conly
- Design date: 1990

The New Zealand one-dollar coin ($1) is a coin of the New Zealand dollar. The current circulating coin was introduced on 11 February 1991 to replace the existing $1 note. There had previously been occasional issues of commemorative "silver dollars", but they are rarely seen in circulation.

The depiction of a kiwi on the reverse helps give the New Zealand dollar the colloquial name "Kiwi (dollar)", although the term was in use before the $1 coin was introduced.

Both the $1 and $2 coins are gold-coloured, and requests for a Koha, donation or entry fee sometimes say gold coin please.

== History ==
Prior to 1990 there were several commemorative one dollar coins produced in the years, including in 1967 for the beginning of decimalisation, 1969 for the bicentenary of James Cook's voyages, and 1974 for New Zealand Day (now called Waitangi Day). While these were struck as commemorative issues they also served as valid legal tender.

The current coin replaced the New Zealand one dollar note in use ever since New Zealand's currency was decimalised on 10 July 1967. The reason for replacing the note was due to inflation making the note more expensive to produce, and notes had to be replaced regularly due to wear and tear. The $1 coins, and $2 coins, were first minted in 1990, but circulated in 1991. The $1 notes were withdrawn later that year.

The new $1 coin was made of aluminium bronze, and was 23.0 mm in diameter, 2.74 mm thick, and 8.0 g in weight. The edge of the coin consisted of eight sections, alternating between milling and plain sections. The reverse of the coin was designed by Robert Maurice Conly, and depicted two symbols of New Zealand: a kiwi facing left in the centre, surrounded by four fronds of the silver fern (Cyathea dealbata). Both the kiwi and the silver ferns sat above the legend reading the denomination "ONE DOLLAR". The obverse consisted of Raphael Maklouf's portrait of Queen Elizabeth II, the Queen of New Zealand, with the legend reading "ELIZABETH II NEW ZEALAND [year of minting]".

In 1999, the obverse of all new $1 coins was changed with the addition of Ian Rank-Broadley's portrait of Queen Elizabeth II, and the legend was rearranged to read "NEW ZEALAND ELIZABETH II [year of minting]".

In 2006, the Reserve Bank of New Zealand replaced the 10c, 20c and 50c coins in circulation with smaller, lighter ones, and removed the 5c coin from circulation. The $1 remained the same as it was relatively new (the oldest $1 coins were only 14 years old), they circulated well, and the extra expense of adapting machines that only took $1 coins. Another reason for the change in size was that the 10c and $1 coin were very similar in size, being only 0.62 mm different in diameter.

Due to a similar design, it was sometimes possible to pass the $1 coin as a £1 coin in the United Kingdom, in shops and vending machines. However, since the new 2017 £1 coin release this is no longer possible.

== Mintage Figures ==
Year	Coins minted
1990	40,000,000
1991	10,000,000
2000	5,000,000
2002	8,000,000
2003	4,000,000
2004	2,700,000
2005	2,000,000
2008	11,000,000
2010	10,000,000
2013	10,080,000
2015	10,000,000
2019	12,960,000
2020	8,760,000
Total	134,500,000

Total value: $134,500,000

== Future ==
After the death of Queen Elizabeth II in September 2022, the Reserve Bank said it would exhaust its existing coin stocks before introducing new coins featuring King Charles III. Based on current stock levels, this would likely be several years away.

== See also ==
- Australian one-dollar coin
