= John Wonnacott =

English painter

John Henry Wonnacott CBE (born 1940, London, England) is a British painter.

Wonnacott trained at the Slade School of Fine Art during 1958–63. He taught at Reading University's department of fine art alongside Ray Atkins from 1965 to 1973, recalling "From the start Ray and I determined to work alongside the students. I drew for my two days at the beginning of the week while Ray often worked on substantial paintings at his end, with one of his models posing for at least half a term. It was rewarding to be instructing students in measurement and objective analysis in a room dominated by Ray’s energy-packed images." Following this, he taught at the Norwich School of Art from 1977 to 1986. He then moved to Southend-on-Sea, Essex, and still lives there. His solo exhibitions include shows at the Scottish National Portrait Gallery in Edinburgh (1986) and the National Portrait Gallery in London (2000). He has also had artworks exhibited at the Barbican Centre, the Royal Academy, and the Tate Gallery, all in London.

In 1997, Wonnacott painted the British prime minister John Major. In 2000, he painted the British royal family in a 12-foot tall artwork.

Wonnacott is a Commander of the Order of the British Empire (CBE), awarded in 2000. He was the 2005 winner of the Ondaatje Prize for portraiture.
