= Spanish flower =

Coin shape

The Spanish flower (Spanish: Flor española, or canto liso estriado, "fluted smooth edge") is a type of coin flan shape. It consists of a smooth edge separated into equal sections by seven indents. At least two coin issuers, the European Union and Fiji, have mentioned explicitly that the Spanish flower shape was chosen to help the visually-impaired. However, the Polish commemorative coin has different technical specifications than the circulation issue, which makes it impractical in daily use. Therefore, the Spanish flower shape has novelty value only on this coin.

== Origin ==
Spanish flower

The Spanish 50 peseta coins issued between 1990 and 2000 were the first to feature the Spanish flower shape.

== Coins with Spanish flower shape ==
- Spain, 50 pesetas 1990-1999
- Eurozone, 20 euro cent from 1999
- Azerbaijan, 10 qəpik from 2006
- New Zealand, 20 cents from 2006
- Malaysia, 50 sen from 2012
- Poland, 2 złote 2012, 50th anniversary of Radio of Poland
- Fiji, 2 dollars
- Sri Lanka, 2 Rupees, 2017
- Kazakhstan, 200 tenge, 2020
