= James Berry (artist) =

New Zealand artist & stamp designer

James Berry OBE
- Born: Reginald George James Berry; 20 June 1906; London, England
- Died: 6 November 1979 (aged 73); Auckland, New Zealand
- Occupation: Artist

Reginald George James Berry OBE (20 June 1906 – 6 November 1979) was a New Zealand artist, noted for creating a large number of postage stamp and coin designs. He was born in London in 1906, and emigrated to New Zealand in 1925. He went on to become a commercial artist at a Wellington advertising agency, and in 1932 became a freelance artist. His work included book covers and illustrations, but is most famous for more than 1,000 stamp, coin and medal designs.

== Biography ==
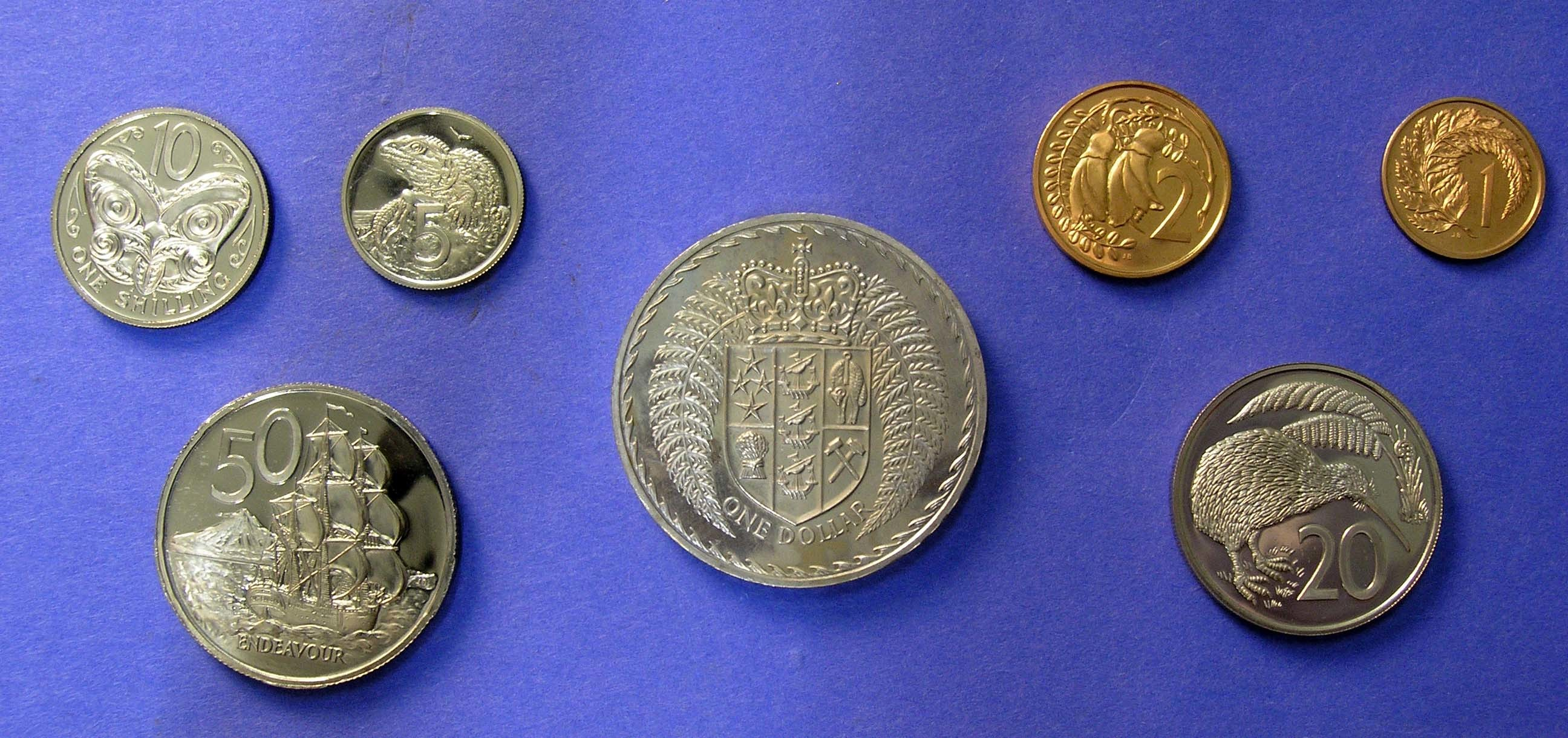
The 1967 decimal coin set, with designs by Berry

Berry's first successful stamp design was for New Zealand's 1933 health stamp. For the next 20 years he designed a vast majority of the stamps issued by New Zealand. Increasing numbers of stamp issues meant that more artists were subsequently employed, but Berry continued designing stamps into the 1970s. Berry also designed stamps for Western Samoa, the Cook Islands, Niue, Tonga, and Bermuda.

After a lengthy process, Berry was the artist for the final designs selected for New Zealand's decimal coins, introduced in 1967 in denominations of 1, 2, 5, 10, 20 and 50 cents. The 1, 2 and 5-cent coins have been withdrawn from circulation, and the 20-cent redesigned. Berry's 10-cent and 50-cent designs remain in use today, although current coins are smaller than the originals.

Berry died on 6 November 1979 in Auckland.

== Awards and honours ==
During his life, Berry was accorded various awards and honours, including:

- 1948 – described by the American journal Weekly Philatelic Gossip as "the greatest postage stamp designer in the world".
- 1966 – named "Man of the Year" by the Dominion Sunday Times
- 1968 – appointed Officer of the Order of the British Empire, for services as designer of postage stamps and decimal currency coins, in the 1968 New Year Honours
- 1978 – honorary member of the Royal Philatelic Society of New Zealand.
- 1980 – Gold Medal, Accademia Italiana dell'Arte e del Lavoro

== Bibliography ==
- J.R. Tye – The Image Maker. The Art of James Berry. Hodder and Stoughton, Auckland London Sydney Toronto 1984. 192 Pages.
