= Arnold Machin =

British sculptor, coin designer and stamp designer (1911–1999)

Arnold Machin OBE RA FRSS
- Machin in later life
- Born: 30 September 1911; Stoke-on-Trent, England, UK
- Died: 9 March 1999 (aged 87); Stafford Borough, Staffordshire, England, UK
- Education: Royal College of Art, London
- Known for: China painting, sculpture, coin design, postage stamp design
- Notable work: Portraits of Queen Elizabeth II on British decimal coinage and postage stamps

Arnold Machin OBE RA FRSS (/ˈmeɪtʃɪn/; 30 September 1911 – 9 March 1999) was a British artist, sculptor, and coin and postage stamp designer.

== Biography ==
Machin was born Stoke-on-Trent in 1911. He started work at the age of 14 as an apprentice china painter at the Minton Pottery. During the Depression he learnt to sculpt at Stoke-on-Trent College of Art, which was opposite the Minton factory. In the 1930s he moved to Derby, where he worked at Royal Crown Derby and met his wife Patricia. He went on to study at the Royal College of Art in London.

After imprisonment in the Second World War as a conscientious objector, he returned to modelling and sculpture, and created many notable ceramics which are now prized collector's items. In 1947 he was elected an associate member of the Royal Academy of Arts, was a Master of Sculpture from 1959 to 1966 and became the longest-serving member of the Academy. He was elected an Academician in 1956 and a Fellow of the Royal British Society of Sculptors. From 1951, he was a tutor at the Royal College of Art. Machin was appointed an Officer of the Order of the British Empire (OBE) in the 1965 New Year Honours.

After retirement, Machin lived in his home, Garmelow Manor, Eccleshall, Stafford Borough, Staffordshire, until his death in 1999, aged 87.

== Stamp and coin designs ==
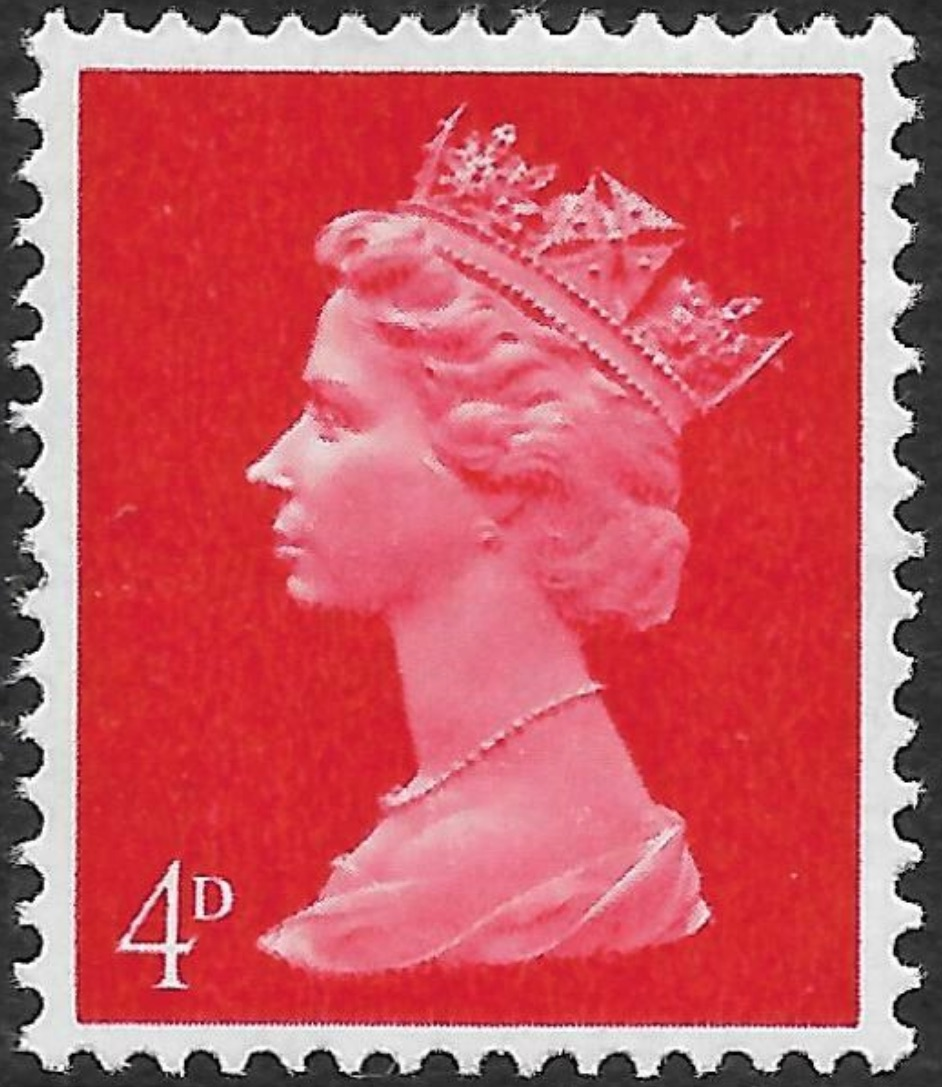
Machin's portraits of Queen Elizabeth II: as used on decimal coinage from 1968 (left), and on a British postage stamp of 1969.

In 1964 Machin was chosen to design a new image of Queen Elizabeth II for the decimal coinage, which was to be introduced from 1968. This was used for all British coins until 1984 and was also used on the coins of Rhodesia in 1964, coins of Canada from 1965 to 1989, Australia from 1966 to 1984 and New Zealand from 1967 to 1985.

In 1966 the Queen approved Machin's similar design for an effigy of her to be used on what came to be known as the "Machin series" of British definitive postage stamps. Machin produced a bas-relief in clay which, when combined with a different coloured background, is reminiscent of the overlaid decoration of potteries such as Wedgwood. The design was first used on the 4d stamp which was issued in June 1967, and was used on all British definitive stamps (except more recent regional issues) since. It is thought that this design is one of the most reproduced works of art in history with approximately 320 billion copies produced.

On several occasions the Queen was approached with suggestions for the replacement of the Machin stamp portrait. Although she considered alternatives, she never approved any new design, stipulating that any such replacement would have to be "a work of real quality".

In 2007 the Machin-designed stamp was still in use at its 40th anniversary and to mark the occasion, the Royal Mail issued a commemorative stamp featuring a photograph of Machin. It was also available for sale in a miniature sheet which incorporated another stamp with a reproduction of a Machin series stamp, as well as two £1 Machins in different colours.

In 2017, the 50th anniversary was celebrated by Royal Mail with a large number of products including miniature sheets, presentation packs, first day covers, a retail stamp booklet, a prestige stamp booklet, a medal cover, and new post and go faststamps.

== Conservation ==
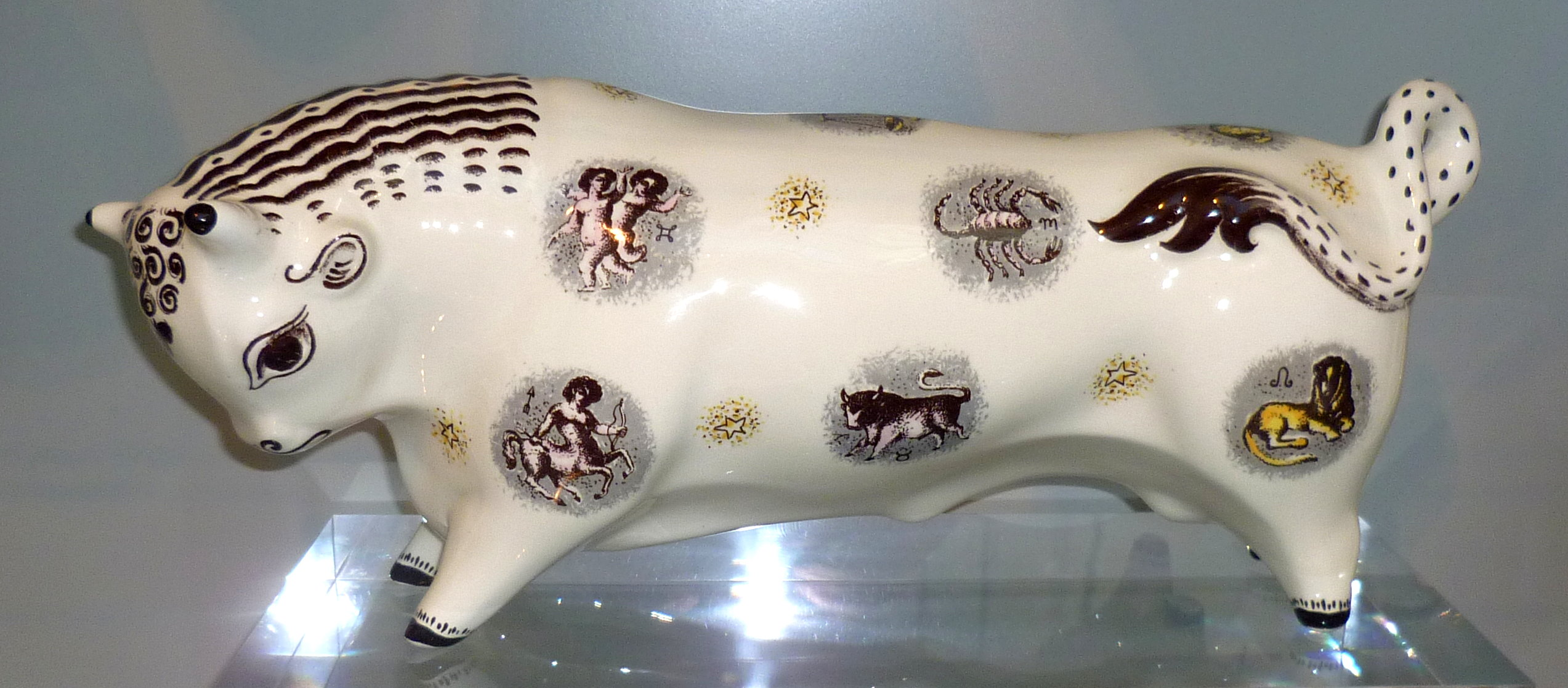
Taurus the Bull, modelled by Arnold Machin in 1945. Produced by Wedgwood, 1950, earthenware and transfer printing. The design includes the signs of the zodiac.

In the year 1956, while resident at number 15 The Villas, Stokeville, an estate of 24 Victorian houses in Stoke-upon-Trent, he received publicity in the national press when he chained himself to an old metal lamp-post, in protest at its planned removal. Machin's protest, "against the destruction of all the beautiful things which is going on in this country" did not prevent the lamp-post from being replaced by a concrete one; however, it was given to him for his own garden and his wife Patricia unlocked him. The lamp has since been restored to its original position.

== Family ==
Machin and his wife, (the author and painter Patricia), had a son, Francis (1949–2007), who was also an artist, and an architect.

After Francis died, some of his father's possessions, from his house near Eccleshall in rural Staffordshire, were sold at auction. These included the fourth of the known final plasters made to create the Machin stamp series, the three others being kept in the Royal Mail archives.

Minor planet 3109 Machin is named in his honour.

Preceded by Mary Gillick	Coins of the pound sterling Obverse sculptor 1965	Succeeded by Raphael Maklouf
