= Raphael Maklouf =

British sculptor (born 1937)

Raphael Maklouf FRSA
- Born: Raphael David Maklouf; 10 December 1937 (age 88); Jerusalem, Mandatory Palestine
- Education: Camberwell School of Art
- Occupation: Sculptor

Raphael David Maklouf (born 10 December 1937) is a British sculptor, best known for designing an effigy of Queen Elizabeth II used on the coins of many Commonwealth nations.

Maklouf was born in Jerusalem, to a Jewish family; his father was Samuel Maklouf (1911–1990, born in Safed, then in Palestine); his mother was Leonie Maklouf (born in Saarbrücken, Germany, 1915).

The family emigrated to the United Kingdom after the Second World War. Raphael Maklouf attended the Camberwell School of Art until 1958, afterwards becoming an academic lecturer for ten years. He was made an Associate of the Royal Society of British Sculptors in 1979.

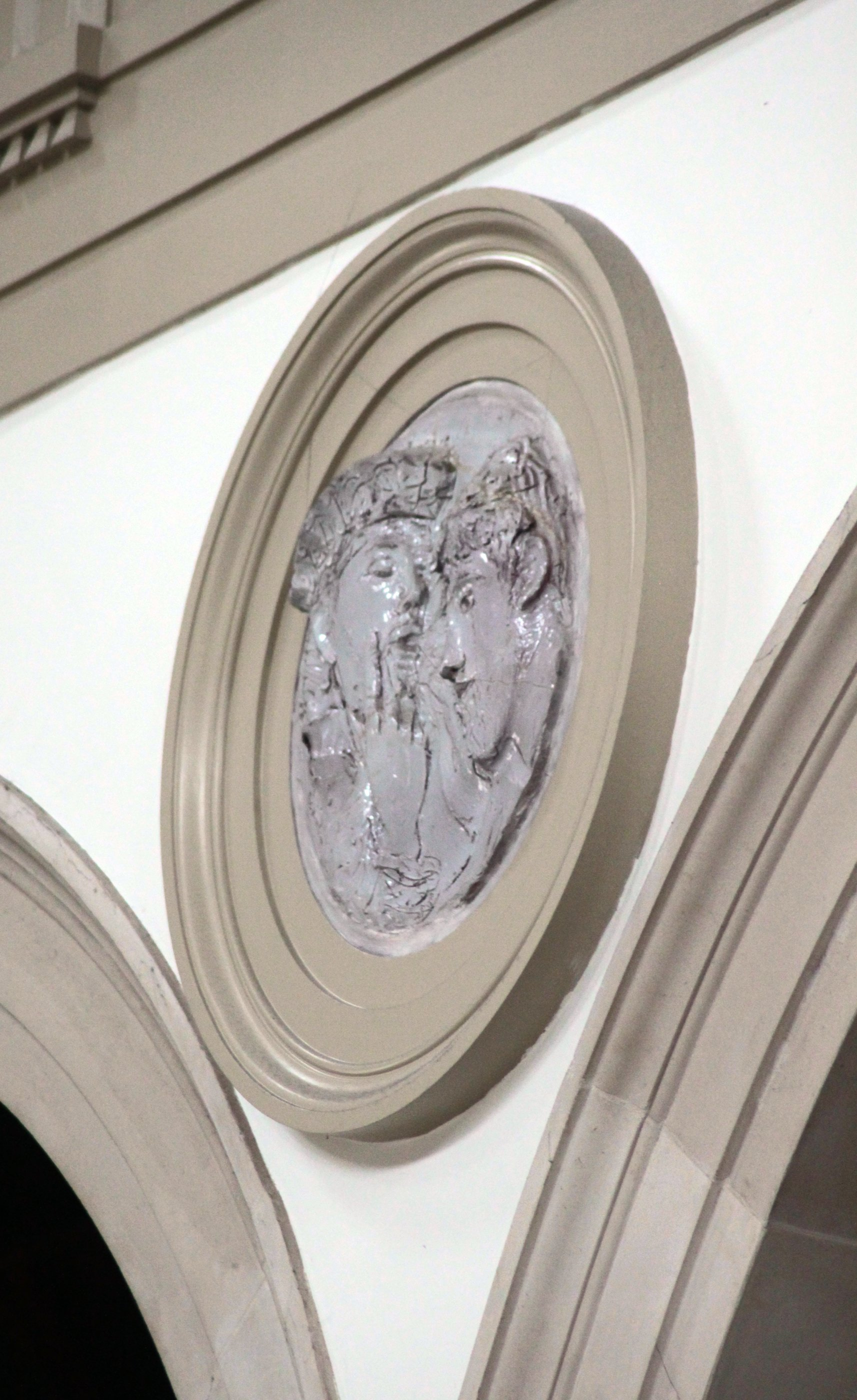
One of Maklouf's Stations of the Cross in Brentwood Cathedral

Two of his designs were selected for British coinage on 8 August 1984, one for general circulation and another for commemorative issues. They were used on the coins of several countries from 1985 to 1997. His initials, RDM, are engraved at the base of the Queen's neck. He is additionally known for his sculptural design representing the fifteen Stations of the Cross in Brentwood Cathedral. He is associated with Tower Mint Ltd, which privately produces medals, coins for collectors, and similar items.

Preceded by Arnold Machin	Coins of the pound sterling Obverse sculptor 1984	Succeeded by Ian Rank-Broadley
