= Magic lantern (disambiguation) =

A magic lantern is an early type of image projector, an ancestor of the modern slide projector.

Magic lantern may also refer to:

== Books ==
- Magic Lantern (novel), 1945 novel by Lady Eleanor Smith
- Magic Lantern, an alternate version of the comic book hero Green Lantern
- The Magic Lantern, a 1952 novel by Robert Carson satirizing Hollywood
- The Magic Lantern, a 1988 autobiography by Swedish film director Ingmar Bergman
- The Magic Lantern, a 1990 book by Timothy Garton Ash recounting the fall of communism throughout Eastern Europe

== Music ==
- The Magic Lanterns, a 1960s music group
- Magic Lantern (album), 2023 art book and studio album by Yorushika
- Magic Lantern, a 1968 album by Haymarket Square

== Theatre ==
- Magician's Lantern, a Czech theater in Prague which served as the headquarters for the Velvet Revolution reform movement
- Magic Lantern (theater), a theater in Bridgton, Maine, United States
- Rainbow and Magic Lantern Cinemas, in Canada
- Magic Lantern, a street theater and puppetry group in the 1970s, formed by Taffy Thomas

== Software ==
- Magic Lantern (firmware), enhancements to Canon digital SLRs
- Magic Lantern (spyware), FBI keylogging and surveillance software

== Other uses ==
- Magic Lantern (charity), United Kingdom-based educational charity

== See also ==
- Magic lamp, a plot device in the story of Aladdin
- The Punch and Judy Murders, also published under the title The Magic Lantern Murders
- Laterna magica (disambiguation)
