= James Mayhew =

British artist and writer

James Mayhew

James John Mayhew (born 1964 in Stamford, Lincolnshire) is an English illustrator and author of children's books, storyteller, artist and concert presenter/live art performer.

== Early life and education ==
The son of RAF pilot John Byrne Mayhew and Linda Georgina Mayhew (née Leighton), James Mayhew was brought up in the village of Blundeston, Suffolk. He was a founder pupil of the Benjamin Britten High School and later attended the Denes High School in Lowestoft (for sixth form studies). On leaving school Mayhew studied at Lowestoft School of Art from 1982 to 1984, and then at Maidstone College of Art (now the University for the Creative Arts).

== Publishing career ==
Mayhew's first published work was Katie's Picture Show (1989). In 1982, a summer as a pavement artist in Lowestoft, recreating famous works of art, inspired this idea, which was subsequently developed at Maidstone College of Art in 1984. This was the start of a series about a girl who explores paintings by climbing inside them. The central character is based on the author's sister, Katharine. There are currently 14 titles in the series, including Katie and the Mona Lisa (Renaissance art); Katie and the Waterlily Pond (Monet's pictures); Katie and the Starry Night (Van Gogh) and the non-art-related title Katie's London Christmas. In 2014 Mayhew re-illustrated the first title for a 25th anniversary edition. A musical stage production of Katie and the Mona Lisa was premiered at the Ashcroft Theatre, Croydon in April 2013, subsequently repeated in a revised production at the Edinburgh Fringe in 2015. Katie in London was one of 50 books chosen for the Books about Town project in 2014, where books were recreated as benches. Mayhew hand-painted his bench which was positioned near the Tower of London until auctioned off in October 2014.

Mayhew has published over 50 books. They include the Ella Bella Ballerina series, Once Upon A Tune, Miranda the Castaway, Boy, illustrations for the Mouse and Mole books (animated for BBC television, with the voices of Alan Bennett, Richard Briers and Imelda Staunton), Gaspard the Fox series (by Zeb Soanes), Nen and the Lonely Fisherman (by Ian Eagleton), Koshka's Tales (a collection of Russian Folk stories), Can you see a Little Bear? and Mrs Noah's Pockets (story by Jackie Morris). Mayhew has had books published in Japan, China, Korea, Germany, France, Greece, Estonia, Spain, Catalonia, Scandinavia, Russia, Turkey, the US, and other countries. He has also written for television (Melody and Driver Dan's Story Train). In 2018 he illustrated the first in a series of books by BBC Radio 4 broadcaster Zeb Soanes, called Gaspard the Fox, about a real urban fox that visits the author in North London.

== Awards ==
In 1994 he received The New York Times Award for one of the ten best illustrated books of the year for The Boy and the Cloth of Dreams, written by Jenny Koralek. In 2011 Mayhew was the first illustrator selected to appear on the BBC's Authors Live series for Scottish Book Trust. In 2022 Nen and the Lonely Fisherman (by Ian Eagleton) was awarded the inaugural Children's and YA Polari Prize for LGBTQ+ books, in a ceremony at the British Library.

== Presenting concerts ==
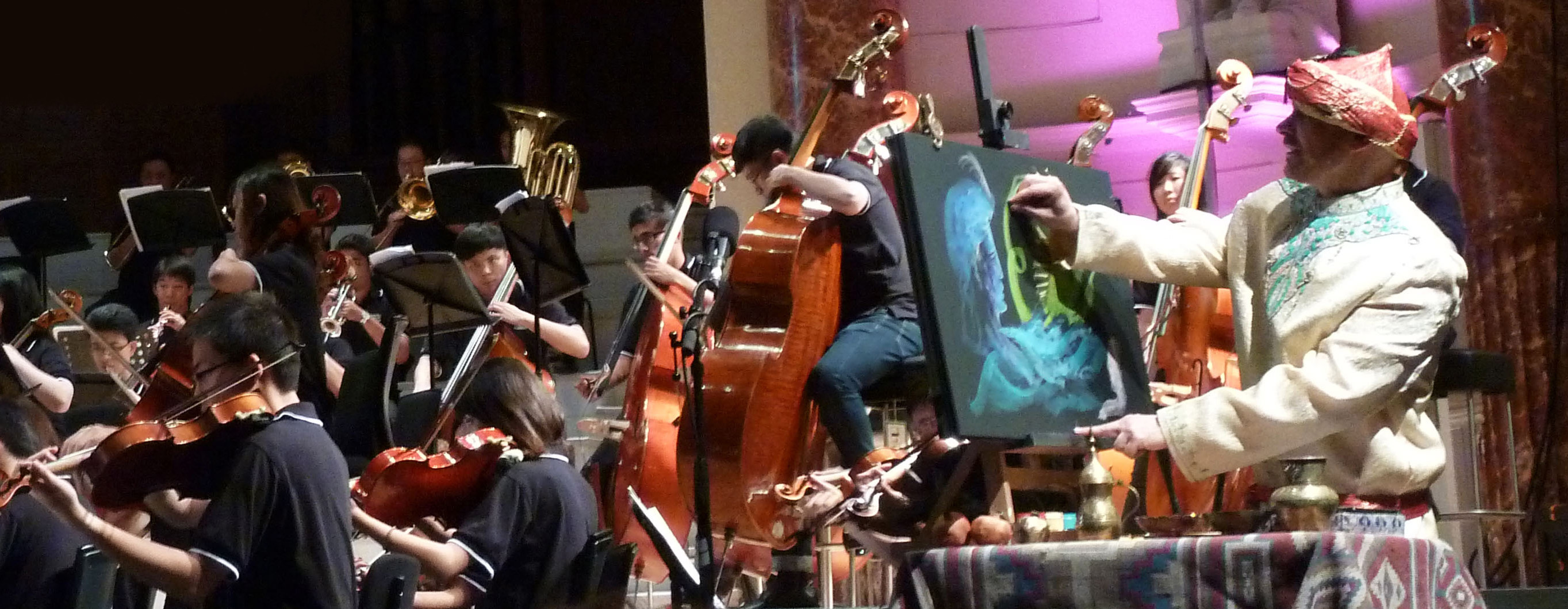
James Mayhew painting to Rimsky-Korsakov's Scheherazade with The Orchestra of the Music Makers at the Cheltenham Music Festival.

Since 2007 Mayhew has devised and presented classical music concerts for children with different orchestras, ensembles and soloists. These events incorporate narration and live illustration, painted in time to the music, and usually projected. They have included Peter and the Wolf, The Firebird, Swan Lake, Pictures at an Exhibition, The Young Person's Guide to the Orchestra, The Planets, William Tell and Scheherazade. In 2016 he made his debut at the Royal Albert Hall.

Mayhew's collaborations include concerts with the BBC National Orchestra of Wales, the Royal Scottish National Orchestra, London Mozart Players, the Doric String Quartet, Carducci Quartet, The Orchestra of the Music Makers from Singapore, The Piccadilly Symphony Orchestra, The Docklands Sinfonia, Chetham's Symphony Orchestra, Baroque specialists Realm of Music, and the Russian pianist Alexander Ardakov. In 2013 he designed sets and costumes for a production of the opera Noye's Fludde in Tewkesbury Abbey, to celebrate Benjamin Britten's centenary year, and as part of his role as the Guest Director of the 2013 Cheltenham Music Festival.

In February 2017, the composer Bernard Hughes adapted Mayhew's The Knight Who Took All Day as a concert work for orchestra and narrator. Mayhew himself narrated (and illustrated) the premiere with the Hertford Symphony Orchestra. Later that month, he departed from his usual classical concerts to join the singer-songwriter Tanita Tikaram at the Barbican Centre in London. Mayhew painted to two songs: "Glass Love Train" and "Cathedral Song".

In July 2017, Mayhew performed, as narrator, in the premiere performances of a new orchestral work for children, for which he also wrote the script: The Caretaker's Guide to the Orchestra. The music was composed by Jeremy Holland-Smith and was performed by the Docklands Sinfonia. The performances were directed by Royal Ballet choreographer/director Will Tuckett.

Mayhew is artistic advisor to The Són Project, the Southampton-based professional orchestra.

Mayhew has published two books of stories based on music to which he has presented at concerts: Once Upon a Tune (2021) and A Symphony of Stories (2024) both published by Otter-Barry Books.

== Other projects ==
Mayhew has spoken at festivals, conferences and schools internationally and in 2014 was Illustrator in Residence at the Edinburgh International Book Festival. He has exhibited at the Scottish National Gallery in 2010 and 2014/15. In 2017 he worked in Singapore and Vietnam, on literary and art projects for both students and teachers. For several years he taught students on the Children's Book Illustration M.A. in Cambridge Anglia Ruskin University, and has taught courses on writing at the Arvon Foundation.

Mayhew is an adviser to the charity Action for Children's Arts, and has served as a committee member for the Children's Writers and Illustrator's Group for the Society of Authors, and is active in campaigning for better opportunities for children and children's authors. The art created at concerts has also raised funds for charities through auctions. He is also patron of Magic Lantern, an arts education charity.

Mayhew currently lives in Suffolk with his husband "Toto" (the Catalonian artist Antonio Reche-Martinez).

== Books written or illustrated by Mayhew include ==
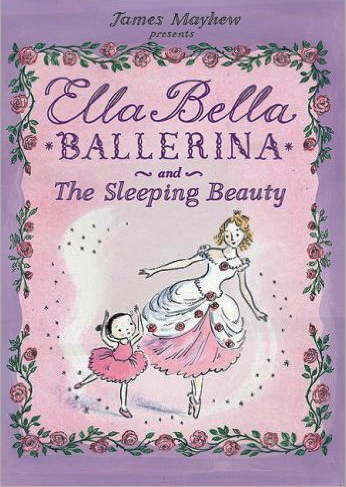
Front cover of Ella Bella Ballerina and The Sleeping Beauty by James Mayhew

Written and illustrated by James Mayhew

- Katie and the Bathers (Katie and Grandma Book 1)
- Katie and the Dinosaurs (Katie and Grandma Book 2)
- Katie and the Starry Night (Katie and Grandma Book 3)
- Katie and the Mona Lisa (Katie and Grandma Book 4)
- Katie and the Sunflowers (Katie and Grandma Book 5)
- Katie in London (Katie and Grandma Book 6)
- Katie and the Impressionists (Katie and Grandma Book 7)
- Katie's Picture Show (Katie and Grandma Book 8)
- Katie and the Spanish Princess (Katie and Grandma Book 9)
- Katie and the Waterlily Pond (Katie and Grandma Book 10)
- Katie in Scotland (Katie and Grandma Book 11)
- Katie and the British Artists (Katie and Grandma Book 12)
- Katie's London Christmas (Katie and Grandma Book 13)
- Katie's Sunday Afternoon (Katie and Grandma Book 14)
- Once Upon A Tune
- Koshka's Tales: Stories from Russia
- Ella Bella Ballerina and The Sleeping Beauty
- Ella Bella Ballerina and Swan Lake
- Ella Bella Ballerina and Cinderella
- Ella Bella Ballerina and The Nutcracker
- Ella Bella Ballerina and A Midsummer Night's Dream
- Ella Bella Ballerina and the Magic Toyshop
- Madame Nightingale Will Sing Tonight
- Dare You!
- Miranda the Explorer
- Miranda the Castaway
- The Magic Sword
- Boy
- The Knight Who Took All Day
- To Sleep, Perchance to Dream (Shakespeare)
- Boneless and the Tinker
- Death and the Neighbours
- Gallows Hill
- Soft Butler's Ghost
- Get Colouring with Katie
- Discover Art with Katie
- Learn to Draw with Katie

Illustrated by James Mayhew and written by others

- Gaspard the Fox by Zeb Soanes
- Gaspard the Fox - Best in Show by Zeb Soanes
- Nen and the Lonely Fisherman by Ian Eagleton
- Gaspard's Foxtrot by Zeb Soanes
- Mrs Noah's Pockets by Jackie Morris
- Mrs Noah's Garden by Jackie Morris
- Mrs Noah's Song by Jackie Morris
- Shakespeare's Stories (retold by Beverly Birch)
- Barefoot Book of Stories from the Opera (retold by Shahrukh Husain)
- Shakespeare's Story Book: Folk Tales that inspired the Bard (retold by Patrick Ryan)
- Pinocchio (retold by Josephine Poole)
- Mouse and Mole (written by Joyce Dunbar)
- Mouse and Mole Have a Party (by Joyce Dunbar)
- A Very Special Mouse and Mole (by Joyce Dunbar)
- Happy Days for Mouse and Mole (Joyce Dunbar)
- The Boy and the Cloth of Dreams (written by Jenny Koralek)
- The Cloth of Dreams (anthology edited by Sally Grindley)
- Tales of Ghostly Ghouls and Haunting Horrors (written by Martin Waddell)

Written by James Mayhew and illustrated by others

- Who Wants a Dragon? (illustrated by Lindsey Gardiner)
- When Dragons Are Dreaming (illustrated by Lindsey Gardiner)
- Bubble & Squeak (illustrated by Clara Vulliamy)
- Can You See a Little Bear? (illustrated by Jackie Morris)
- Starlight Sailor (illustrated by Jackie Morris)
