= Haymarket Square =

Haymarket Square may refer to:

- Haymarket Square (Boston), in Boston
- Haymarket Square (Chicago), in Chicago
- Haymarket affair, a labor demonstration in Chicago at Haymarket Square in 1886
- Haymarket Square (band), a Chicago-based psychedelic rock band
