= Under the Dome (novel) =

2009 novel by Stephen King

- First edition cover
- Author: Stephen King
- Genre: Science fiction, political
- Publisher: Scribner
- Publication date: November 10, 2009
- Publication place: United States
- Media type: Print (hardcover)
- Pages: 1,074
- ISBN: 978-1-4391-4850-1

Under the Dome is a 2009 science fiction novel by American author Stephen King. It is the 58th book published by King, and it is his 48th novel. The novel focuses on a small Maine town, and tells an intricate, multi-character, alternating perspective story of how the town's inhabitants contend with the calamity of being suddenly cut off from the outside world by an impassable, invisible glass dome-like barrier that seemingly falls out of the sky, transforming the community into a domed city.

== Plot summary ==
The novel covers eight days, from October 21 to October 28.

At 11:44 a.m. on October 21, the small Maine town of Chester's Mill is abruptly and gruesomely separated from the outside world by an invisible, semipermeable, dome-shaped barrier of unknown origin. The immediate appearance of the barrier causes a number of injuries and fatalities and traps former Army Captain Dale "Barbie" Barbara—who is trying to leave Chester's Mill because of a local dispute—inside the town.

The town's police chief, Howard "Duke" Perkins, is killed instantly as his pacemaker explodes when he gets too close to the dome. James "Big Jim" Rennie, the town's second selectman and Duke's opposition, uses the opportunity to use the Dome as part of a power play to take over the town. Big Jim appoints one of his cronies, the incompetent Peter Randolph, as the new police chief. He begins expanding the ranks of the Chester's Mill police with questionable candidates, including his son, Junior Rennie, and his friends. Junior has frequent migraines caused by an as-yet-undiscovered brain tumor which has begun affecting his mental state; unknown to Big Jim, Junior was in the process of beating and strangling a girl, Angie McCain, to death when the Dome appeared and has killed another girl, Dodee Sanders (the daughter of head selectman Andy Sanders), by the time Big Jim places him on the police force.

Elsewhere in Chester's Mill, Col. James O. Cox, who is stationed outside of the Dome, calls Julia Shumway, the editor of the local newspaper, and has her carry a message to Barbie to contact him. Cox asks Barbie to act as the government's agent to bring down the Dome. Drawing similarities to Barbie's Army specialization in locating enemy munitions factories, Cox gives him the task of locating the Dome's power source, which is believed to be somewhere in the town. By virtue of a presidential order, Barbie is reinstated in the U.S. military and brevetted to the rank of Colonel, and is presented with a decree granting him authority over the township, acknowledging the political tensions within the town. However, this action is not well received by Big Jim and his faction. Around this time, Brenda Perkins, Duke's widow, discovers a file on her husband's computer that lists Big Jim's criminal schemes.

As Big Jim covertly orchestrates unease and panic to build up his grab for power, Barbie, Julia and some other townspeople attempt to stop the situation from escalating. After crossing Big Jim's path on several occasions, Barbie is framed and arrested for the murders of Reverend Lester Coggins, who laundered money for Big Jim's large-scale methamphetamine operation, and Brenda, both murdered by Big Jim, as well as Angie and Dodee. While Barbie is in jail, other residents track the source of the Dome, using a Geiger counter, to an abandoned farm; the device they find in the middle of the farm's orchard is strongly indicated to be extraterrestrial in origin. The restrictions issued by Big Jim become more severe, and the police force grows more abusive, galvanizing the town and eventually leading some residents to break Barbie out of jail, killing Junior seconds before he can murder Barbie.

The semi-organized resistance flees to the abandoned farm, where multiple people touch the strange object and experience visions. They conclude that the device was put in place by extraterrestrial "leatherheads", named after their appearance, and that specifically they are juveniles who have set up the Dome as a form of entertainment, a sort of ant farm used to capture sentient beings and allow their captors to view everything that happens to them.

On an organized "Visitors Day"—when people outside the Dome can meet at its edge with people within—Big Jim sends Randolph and a detachment of police to take back control of his former methamphetamine operation from Phil "Chef" Bushey, who is stopping Big Jim from covering up the operation as well as hoarding the more than four hundred tanks of propane stored there. Big Jim underestimates Chef's capacity for self-defense and meth-induced paranoia; he, as well as the now-ostracized Sanders defend themselves and the meth lab with assault rifles. Many are killed in the ensuing gunfight, and Chef, who is mortally wounded, detonates a plastic explosive device he has placed in the meth production facility. The ensuing explosion, combined with the propane and meth-making chemicals, unleashes a toxic firestorm large enough to incinerate most of the town.

More than a thousand of the town's residents are incinerated on national television, leaving alive just over 300 individuals who gradually die out as the toxic air restricts their breathing. Among the survivors are the twenty-seven refugees at the abandoned farm, an orphaned farm boy hiding in a potato cellar, and Big Jim and his informal aide-de-camp, Carter Thibodeau, in the town's fallout shelter. Big Jim and Thibodeau eventually turn on each other over the limited oxygen supply; Big Jim stabs and disembowels Thibodeau, only to die several hours later when hallucinations of the dead send him fleeing into the toxic environment outside. The survivors at the barn begin to slowly asphyxiate, despite efforts by the Army to force clean air through the walls of the Dome using industrial-size fans.

Barbie and Julia go to the control device to beg their captors to release them. Julia makes contact with a single female leatherhead, no longer accompanied by her friends and thus not under peer pressure. After repeatedly expressing that they are real sentient beings with real "little lives," and by sharing a painful childhood incident with the adolescent alien, Julia convinces the leatherhead to have pity on them. The Dome rises slowly and vanishes, allowing the toxic air to dissipate and finally freeing what is left of the town of Chester's Mill.

== Characters ==
=== Main characters ===
- Dale "Barbie" Barbara – A former Army lieutenant (initially referred to as a former captain by Colonel Cox), Barbara became a drifter after separating from the Army. Trapped within feet of the edge of the Dome, witnessing a woodchuck cut in half by the event, Dale was attempting to flee the town after a confrontation with Junior Rennie and his friends. Dale soon becomes the U.S. government's choice to run Chester's Mill, after being recalled to active service and promoted to the rank of colonel (partly based on a favorable report from Jack Reacher). This causes more tension between Dale, Big Jim, and Junior, causing the two to frame Dale for the murders they commit. One of the 26 survivors of the Dome.
- Julia Shumway – A cynical woman who owns and edits The Democrat (despite being a Republican), the town's local newspaper. Julia often feels the need to prove a point and expose those she sees around her. Julia becomes the conduit between Colonel Cox and Dale Barbara via her cell phone. Julia and Dale have a budding romantic relationship. Both Dale and Julia are gutsy and tough, brave enough to try any chance they might have for survival. Julia comes from a family of news executives; the newspaper is a family concern. She was groomed early for success and was viewed by her peers as a "goody-two-shoes". A confrontation with her classmates in fourth grade caused her to rethink her status and changed the course of her academic career; however, this same confrontation is key in helping her formulate a plan to end the siege. One of the 26 survivors of the Dome.
- James "Big Jim" Rennie – A power-obsessed second selectman of Chester's Mill based on Dick Cheney, owner of a used car dealership and the biggest crystal meth lab on the east coast. When Chief Perkins is killed on Dome Day, Big Jim becomes the de facto leader of Chester's Mill. He is owed favors by virtually every person of authority in town; he is also rubber stamped by Andy Sanders, the grieving and incompetent first selectman, and Pete Randolph, the new, incompetent town police chief. Big Jim directly controls both Andy and Pete through most of the story. Big Jim murders Lester Coggins, Brenda Perkins, and Carter Thibodeau during his time under the Dome. His actions make him responsible for the deaths of many others. Presumed dead from heart failure in the town's emergency shelter.
- James "Junior" Rennie – Junior is a smalltown thug and son of the most influential man in Chester's Mill. After he is deputized, he recruits new police officers for his father. Junior gradually devolves from a violent (but somewhat sane) thug to a paranoid, angry sociopath, suffering from a brain tumor disguising itself as migraines. He particularly hates Dale Barbara, who laid a beating on Junior and his friends even though they outnumbered him. Dale could have had Junior arrested for assault, but Dale was an outsider and Junior's father was Big Jim. Junior murders Angie McCain early in the story, and Angie's friend Dodee Sanders a short time later when she stops by the McCain house. He later molests the corpses of the two women, referring to them as his "girlfriends" in his delusional state. He slowly becomes more delusional as the novel progresses and his tumor becomes more debilitating. Eventually Junior comes to the false conclusion that Barbara has poisoned him and sets out to kill him. He later murders special deputies Stacey Moggins, Rupe Libby, and Mickey Wardlaw by shooting them, before being killed himself by Jackie Wettington.
- Eric "Rusty" Everett – A kind-hearted physician assistant at Cathy Russell Hospital. Rusty is married to Linda Everett, a police officer, and has two young daughters, Janelle and Judy. His children are the first of many to experience seizures and prophetic visions from the device that generates the Dome. After the town's doctor dies, Rusty tends to those that are ruined in the chaos that erupts after the Dome's arrival, maintaining a cool, optimistic attitude in a time of stress. Rusty is arrested for threatening Big Jim, but escapes and helps the other survivors. One of the 26 survivors of the Dome.
- Joseph "Scarecrow Joe" McClatchey – A 13-year-old student at Chester's Mill Middle School. Joe is a dedicated skateboarder along with his two friends, Norrie Calvert and Benny Drake. Mature and intelligent beyond his years, Joe is one of the first in town to seek answers for the cause of the Dome rather than try to establish a semblance of order. He organizes a protest at the Dome's wall—assisted by Norrie and Benny—and manages to rally the town before an incident calls the entire protest off. He later becomes a valuable ally of Dale Barbara, assisting him in providing a video feed during the incident early in the book where the government sends a missile to try to destroy the Dome. Afterward, he continues to make an effort to find answers to the Dome with his friends, and is among the group that finds the alien generator in the town's back fields. One of the 26 survivors of the Dome.

=== Minor characters ===
The novel contains an expansive cast of minor characters while maintaining a rather small circle of central players.

- Brenda Perkins – Brenda is married to the late Chief Perkins, who was killed on Day One under the Dome when he approached the surface of the Dome and his pacemaker exploded. Brenda is instrumental in uncovering Big Jim's dirty laundry due to her knowledge of her husband's secret files. These files detail Big Jim's illegal activities. Brenda is a friend of Barbie's. After passing a copy of the files to Andrea Grinnell, she confronts Big Jim. Big Jim murders Brenda when she confronts him with the evidence regarding his criminal activities.
- Frank DeLesseps – Frank is a friend of Junior Rennie. He is engaged to Angie McCain and never suspects that Junior could have killed her. He becomes a special deputy at the request of Big Jim and Junior Rennie and is a participant in the gang-rape of Sammy Bushey. While keeping a vigil at the bedside of the injured Georgia Roux (an accessory to the rape), Frank is shot to death by Sammy.
- Carter Thibodeau – Carter is a friend of Junior Rennie, and so is recommended for special deputy. He participates in the gang-rape of Sammy Bushey and is Georgia Roux's boyfriend until her death. Unlike his peers, Carter is intelligent and cunning. Carter becomes Big Jim's personal bodyguard for a short time. Carter shoots Andrea Grinnell to death at the special town meeting before the giant explosion. Eventually he is killed by Big Jim in the town's fallout shelter after Carter attempted to kill Big Jim in order to preserve oxygen.
- Melvin Searles – Another friend of Junior Rennie, Melvin becomes a special deputy at the request of Big Jim Rennie, after Junior recommends him. Melvin is another participant in the rape of Sammy Bushey. Melvin is killed by the explosion started by Phil Bushey and Andy Sanders.
- Georgia Roux – Georgia is the girlfriend of Carter Thibodeau. Georgia becomes a special deputy at the request of Big Jim Rennie, after Junior recommends her. She is a participant in the rape of Sammy Bushey by egging the rapists on. She is admitted to the hospital after receiving facial injuries in the Food City riot. A cowering Georgia is shot dead by Sammy Bushey out of revenge.
- Andy Sanders – Andy is the town's first selectman. He is also widower of Claudette Sanders and the father of Dodee Sanders. Andy has been a puppet to Big Jim Rennie for a long time prior to the Dome and exerts no power. Andy first finds that Claudette has been killed when her plane crashes into the Dome. This immediately destroys any will or motivation he may have had left, causing Andy to follow Big Jim unquestioningly. Upon hearing news of losing his daughter as well, he is about to commit suicide. He changes his mind after an emergency phone call, then joins forces with The Chef. Andy becomes hooked on crystal meth, and later defends the radio station along with The Chef. During the raid on the station, Andy kills Peter Randolph, Roger Killian, Stewart Bowie and Fernald Bowie before he is willingly killed in the explosion detonated by Chef and himself.
- Phil "Chef" Bushey – As far as most of the citizens of Chester's Mill are concerned, Phil Bushey has disappeared. He is the estranged husband of Sammy Bushey and father of Little Walter Bushey. Big Jim and some others know that Phil has become "The Chef" and is holed up at the Christian radio station, charged with cooking vast amounts of crystal meth, hence his name. During the raid on the station, Phil kills Freddy Denton, Aubrey Towle, Stubby Norman and others. Phil presses the button with Andy Sanders which triggers the explosion that destroys himself and the town.
- Peter Randolph – Pete becomes Chief of Police after Duke Perkins' death. He is fairly simple minded and is easily manipulated by Big Jim, who secretly considers Pete his idiot. It is through Pete that Big Jim is able to expand and control the Mill's police force. Pete is executed by Andy Sanders during the raid on the radio station.
- Ollie Dinsmore – Ollie is the son of Alden and Shelley Dinsmore and older brother of Rory Dinsmore. Ollie must survive the death of his parents and brother while under the Dome. He amazingly survives the fire in the Dome by hiding under a pile of potatoes in a cellar with an oxygen tank. When the oxygen runs out, the army provides giant fans which allowed small amounts of air to enter the dome, allowing Ollie to survive. He is one of the 26 survivors of the dome.
- Romeo "Rommie" Burpee – Romeo is married to Michela Burpee. He is the owner of Burpee's department store, and assists in breaking Barbie and Rusty out of prison, as well as getting Dale up to the alien device using resources from his store. Romeo is initially motivated by long ago lover Brenda Perkins' murder. One of the 26 survivors of the dome.
- Jackie Wettington – A police officer on the original Chester's Mill force, she is fired once Big Jim brings enough of his own recruits. Jackie assists in breaking Barbie and Rusty out of prison. She also kills Junior Rennie once Junior has completely snapped. One of the 26 survivors of the dome.
- Piper Libby – Reverend of the First Congregational Church in Chester's Mill. Despite her position, she no longer believes in God. One of the 26 survivors of the Dome.
- Linda Everett – Another police officer from the original force, she is fired because she is married to Rusty Everett. Her two daughters are Janelle and Judy Everett. One of the 26 survivors of the dome.
- Thurston Marshall – Professor at a university and acting doctor at the hospital. Partner of Carolyn Sturges, temporary father figure to Aidan and Alice Appleton. Dies from asphyxiation inside the dome, shortly before it was lifted.
- Carolyn Sturges – Graduate assistant at a university, partner of Thurston Marshall and temporary mother figure to Aidan and Alice Appleton. Killed by a stray bullet fired by Freddy Denton at the town hall meeting.
- Alice Appleton – Separated from her mother due to the dome, older sister of Aidan Appleton, is cared for by Thurston Marshall and Carolyn Sturges whilst under the dome. One of the 26 survivors of the dome.
- Aidan Appleton – Separated from his mother due to the dome, younger brother of Alice Appleton, is cared for by Thurston Marshall and Carolyn Sturges whilst under the dome. Dies from asphyxiation shortly before the dome was lifted.
- Sammy Bushey – Wife of Phil "Chef" Bushey and mother of Little Walter Bushey. She sells marijuana and other drugs and is involved with Dodee Sanders before Sanders' murder. Later on, she is raped by Frank DeLesseps, Carter Thibodeau and Melvin Searles while Georgia Roux eggs them on. She kills DeLesseps and Roux at a hospital as revenge before killing herself.
- Angie McCain – Daughter of LaDonna and Henry McCain, she was a waitress at Sweetbriar Rose. She was engaged to Frank DeLesseps, she was known as the town flirt. She is murdered by Junior Rennie.
- Lester Coggins – Reverend of Christ the Holy Redeemer Church in Chester's Mill. In stark contrast to Piper Libby, he is devout to the point of insanity, frequently flagellating himself for his sins. He assists in Big Jim Rennie's meth ring but is overcome by guilt after the Dome falls and attempts to convince Rennie to come clean. Rennie bludgeons him with a gilded baseball and with the help of Junior Rennie blames the murder on Dale Barbara.
- Freddy Denton – Police officer, one of the first to take the changes in his stride, kills "Clover" Libby (Piper Libby's pet dog) as she mauls a fellow Special Deputy, and Carolyn Sturges. He is killed by Phil "Chef" Bushey.
- Dodee Sanders – Daughter of Claudette and Andy Sanders. She was a waitress at Sweetbriar Rose and was in a relationship with Samantha Bushey. Julia Shumway delivers the news to her that her mother had died. She went to Angie McCain's house to visit her where Junior Rennie murders her.
- Rose Twitchell – Owner of the Sweetbriar Rose, the local café. Sister of Dougie Twitchell and Andrea Grinnell, and employer of Dale Barbara. One of the 26 survivors of the dome.
- Andrea Grinnell – Town's third selectman and recovered Oxycontin addict near the end of the novel. She is married to Tommy Grinnell, and the sister of Dougie Twitchell and Rose Twitchell. Finds the "Vader File" on Big Jim, and begins a proclamation against him during the town hall meeting, where she planned to assassinate Big Jim. After dropping her purse due to withdrawal, Aidan spots her pistol and innocently proclaims, "That lady has a gun!" Killed by Carter Thibodeau.
- Ernie Calvert – Retired supermarket manager; father-in-law of Joanie Calvert and grandfather of Norrie Calvert. Helps break Barbie and Rusty out of prison; dies due to lack of oxygen shortly before the dome was lifted.
- Stacey Moggin – Dispatcher at the police station, a supporter of Dale Barbara who had planned to assist in his break-out but is killed by Junior Rennie.
- "Sloppy" Sam Verdreaux – The town drunk, a heavy-smoker for years. He is (temporarily) the least affected by the toxic air in the Dome and assists Barbara and Shumway in making contact with their dome captors. He dies from the effects of the ill air shortly after the dome was lifted.
- Benny Drake – A teenager and close friend of Joseph McClatchey. He helps Joe and Norrie Calvert search for the cause of the dome. Has a mutual crush on Norrie. He died due to lack of oxygen shortly before the dome was lifted.
- "Audrey" Everett – The Everett's golden retriever. She alerts "Rusty" Everett to his daughters' seizures. She dies due to lack of oxygen shortly before the dome was lifted.
- Norrie Calvert – The daughter of Joan Calvert and granddaughter of Ernie Calvert, she forms a close friendship with Joe McClatchey and Benny Drake. One of the 26 survivors of the Dome.
- Colonel James Cox – Former superior of Dale Barbara and overseer of Dome surveillance/eradication, Cox attempts to control the events under the Dome from the outside to no success.

Other human survivors are Dougie Twitchell, Ginny Tomlinson, Gina Buffalino, Harriet Bigelow, Janelle Everett, Judy Everett, Pete Freeman, Tony Guay, Claire McClatchey, Joanie Calvert, Alva Drake, Little Walter Bushey and Lissa Jamieson. Julia Shumway's dog Horace also survives.

== Writing ==
In January 2008, Time magazine quoted King as saying he would "be killing a lot of trees" with his next novel. The first draft was completed in late August 2008, with the manuscript weighing 19 lb (8.6 kg). King has stated the novel is twice as long as his most recent, Duma Key, at "over 1,500 pages in manuscript", and "deals with some of the same issues that The Stand does, but in a more allegorical way". King also described the novel as "very, very long", adding: "I tried this once before when I was a lot younger and the project was just too big for me." King read from the first draft at "The Three Kings" reading event that was held on April 4, 2008, at the Library of Congress, which was broadcast by C-SPAN as part of their Book TV series on May 4, 2008.

=== The Cannibals connection ===
Under the Dome is a partial rewrite of a novel King attempted to write first in 1972 under the same title and then a second time in 1982 as The Cannibals. As King stated on his official site, these two unfinished works "were two very different attempts to utilize the same idea, which concerns itself with how people behave when they are cut off from the society they've always belonged to. Also, my memory of The Cannibals is that it, like Needful Things, was a kind of social comedy. The new Under the Dome is played dead straight." From the material originally written, only the first chapter is included in the new novel.

According to Stephen J. Spignesi's 1998 book The Lost Work of Stephen King, The Cannibals (originally titled Under the Dome) is an unpublished, unfinished 450-page handwritten novel written in 1982, while King was filming Creepshow. This work later served as inspiration to King's new novel Under the Dome. In 1982, King said: "I've got about four hundred and fifty pages done and it is all about these people who are trapped in an apartment building. Worst thing I could think of. And I thought, wouldn't it be funny if they all ended up eating each other? It's very, very bizarre because it's all on one note. And who knows whether it will be published or not?" In Douglas E. Winter's book The Art of Darkness, Stephen King is also quoted, talking around the time of Creepshow, about the origins of Under the Dome: "I worked on a book called The Cannibals—I had started it five years before, but it was called Under the Dome then. It didn't get finished either time."

On September 15, 2009, Stephen King's official site posted a 61-page facsimile excerpt from King's original novel The Cannibals, consisting of the first four chapters of the original typescript. A further 63 pages were posted on October 4. The excerpts served to also document how long ago King had had the idea of being under a dome:

Several Internet writers have speculated on a perceived similarity between Under the Dome and The Simpsons Movie, where, [...] Springfield is isolated inside a large glass dome [...]. I can't speak personally to this, because I have never seen the movie, and the similarity came as a complete surprise to me...although I know, from personal experience, that the similarity will turn out to be casual. For the doubters, this excerpt [from The Cannibals] should demonstrate that I was thinking dome and isolation long before Homer, Marge, and their amusing brood came on the scene."

=== Environmental and political undertones ===
In an interview for PopEater.com, King admitted the book's environmental theme:

From the very beginning, I saw it as a chance to write about the serious ecological problems that we face in the world today. The fact is we all live under the dome. We have this little blue world that we've all seen from outer space, and it appears like that's about all there is.

In an interview with James Lileks of the Star Tribune, King said:

It's a natural allegorical situation, without whamming the reader over the head with it. I don't like books where everything stands for everything else. It works with Animal Farm: You can be a child and read it as a story about animals, but when you're older, you realize it's about communism, capitalism, fascism. That's the genius of Orwell. But I love the idea about isolating these people, addressing the questions that we face. We're a blue planet in a corner of the galaxy, and for all the satellites and probes and Hubble pictures, we haven't seen evidence of anyone else. There's nothing like ours. We have to conclude we're on our own, and we have to deal with it. We're under the dome. All of us.

Speaking to Time regarding the novel's politics, King said:

I was angry about incompetency. Obviously I'm on the left of center. I didn't believe there was justification for going into the war in Iraq. And it just seemed at the time, that in the wake of 9/11, the Bush Administration was like this angry kid walking down the street who couldn't find whoever sucker punched him, and so turned around and punched the first likely suspect. Sometimes the sublimely wrong people can be in power at a time when you really need the right people. I put a lot of that into the book. But when I started I said, "I want to use the Bush–Cheney dynamic for the people who are the leaders of this town." As a result, you have Big Jim Rennie, the villain of the piece. I got to like the other guy, Andy Sanders. He wasn't actively evil, he was just incompetent—which is how I always felt about George W. Bush.

Speaking to The New York Times Book Review, King said:

I enjoyed taking the Bush–Cheney dynamic and shrinking it to the small-town level. The last administration interested me because of the aura of fundamentalist religion that surrounded it and the rather amazing incompetency of those two top guys. I thought there is something blackly humorous in it. So in a sense, Under the Dome is an apocalyptic version of The Peter Principle.

== Release ==
The paperback edition of Just After Sunset, released on September 29, 2009, included an excerpt from the novel. A 4,000-word excerpt was published in the November 6, 2009 issue (#1074) of Entertainment Weekly.

The preliminary dust jacket cover art was released to online retailers like Amazon.com and Barnes & Noble with the words "cover to be unveiled". In late August 2009, it was revealed that the real cover would be unveiled on October 5, 2009, with parts of it being shown on September 21, 25 and 28. The cover art design for Under the Dome is said to be a departure from King's previous illustrated covers, using a combination of illustration, photographs, and 3D renderings. The final jacket design was released in two variations: with white lettering; and with the less common dark gray lettering.

On December 16, 2009, Stephen King held a book signing at the Magic Lantern movie theater in Bridgton, Maine, the town that the fictitious Chester's Mill is modeled after. He also made several TV appearances discussing the similarity between the real town and the fictional one. "I live 18 miles out of town and I've lived there for a long time," said King. "I looked at the police station, that's the police station in the book. I just used the geography, the lake; everything is there." King was a Bridgton resident for nearly five years. Bridgton also serves as the setting in The Mist (1980). On the day of the release, Stephen King was in New York City at The TimesCenter to promote the book.

In mid-October, Under the Dome became one of the highly discounted book preorders on Amazon.com, Wal-Mart, and Target, sparking a "price war" between the retailers. The price for Under the Dome and several other high-profile hardcover books to be released in November 2009, typically around US$25, was set at just US$9 (a discount of nearly 75 percent off on a new hardcover). Later, Wal-Mart lowered the price to US$8.98 and included free shipping. Target's price was set at US$8.99.

=== Viral marketing ===
A number of viral marketing websites for popular locations referenced in Under the Dome were created to publicize the book, including Big Jim Rennie's Used Cars, the Sweet Briar Rose Diner, the Chester's Mill Democrat Newspaper, and others. A site was created for the Town of Chester's Mill, which provides links to all points of interest. An alternate reality game also took place utilizing all of these sites, beginning at the blog of Scarecrow Joe, one of the characters in the novel.

=== Limited editions ===
A Collector's Edition (limited to 25,000 copies) and a Signed Edition (limited to 1,500 copies) were published by Scribner concurrently with the regular trade edition. These editions feature a dust jacket without any lettering, a removable band with author name and title, printed endpapers with the map of the town in color (regular edition contains a black and white map in the book's front matter), 27 illustrations by The New Yorker cartoonist Matthew Diffee, a ribbon marker, and also contain a deck of cards with the Diffee illustrations. These editions are printed on specialty paper with different binding.

A signed and numbered UK edition, published by Hodder & Stoughton, sold exclusively by both Hatchard's Bookshop and Waterstones, was limited to 500 copies. It included the 4-color endpapers, the 27 trading cards illustrated by cartoonist, Matthew Diffee, and was packaged in a slipcase.

== Reception ==
Author Dan Simmons, to whom Stephen King sent the manuscript for Under the Dome as a gift, commented on it on May 5, 2009, calling the novel "huge, generous, sprawling, infinitely energetic [...], absolutely enjoyable and impressive." Publishers Weekly reviewed the novel on September 11, 2009, calling it "formidably complex and irresistibly compelling." The review said the book contains "themes and images from King's earlier fiction, and while this novel doesn't have the moral weight of, say, The Stand, nevertheless, it's a nonstop thrill ride as well as a disturbing, moving meditation on our capacity for good and evil". In a review for The Plain Dealer, Daniel Dyer calls Under the Dome "a massive cautionary novel", saying it is "busy, ambitious, overlong but addictively munchable, [and] fundamentally a novel about human cruelty, animated by our desires for power, pleasure and sex." USA Today called the novel "propulsively intriguing", "staggeringly addictive", and stated that "Readers can wallow in this glorious novel's metaphoric and oh-so au courant messages about U.S. domination, freedom of the press, torture and environmental abuse, but they also can come to this novel just for the story." The Los Angeles Times called Under the Dome "impressive", containing "lucid prose and chilling precision." Janet Maslin's review for The New York Times said that Under the Dome "has the scope and flavor of literary Americana." Maslin says, "Hard as this thing is to hoist, it's even harder to put down." Ted Anthony of the Associated Press states that "Under the Dome is one of those works of fiction that manages to be both pulp and high art, that successfully—and very improbably—captures the national zeitgeist at this particularly strange and breathless period in American history." On November 9, 2009, the author Neil Gaiman in his blog stated that "Under the Dome was one of [his] favourite books of the year so far."

James Parker of the New York Times noted in his review of Under the Dome that the novel contains lines that are "stinkers", which made him feel "the clutch of sorrow." Regarding King's "pulp speed" output, James Parker noted: "We shouldn't be too squeamish about the odd half-baked simile or lapse into B-movie dialogue." The review in the New York Post states that Under the Dome "shares some of The Stand's faults, like a left-field disaster [...] that works almost as a reverse deus ex machina, randomly wiping out half the cast. In both novels, the climactic "battle"—if you can really call it that—pales to the buildup. King is better at characters and situations than causes and reasons. But at least The Stand feels like a saga [...]. I won't reveal the secret of the Dome, except to say that the payoff is more Star Trek (original series) than epic." John Dugdale, in a review for The Sunday Times wrote: "King's inability to raise his game—to relinquish the methods of his more straightforward tales of the paranormal—prevents you taking his socio-political vision seriously. The simple division of characters into goodies and baddies, the use of magic, the homespun style, the sentimental ending, the vital role played by a dog in defeating the forces of evil—all of these belong in fiction for older children, not the grown-up novels he's bent on emulating."

== Television adaptation ==
Shortly after the release of the book, it was announced that Steven Spielberg's DreamWorks Television would be developing a cable miniseries based on the novel. Spielberg and King were announced as executive producers. Brian K. Vaughan was hired to adapt the book. Vaughan wrote the first episode, which was directed by Niels Arden Oplev. It premiered on June 24, 2013, and was an instant success for CBS; the premiere in June 2013 broke the record as the most-watched summer drama premiere on any television network since 1992, with the "Pilot" episode reaching over 13 million views. The show ran for three seasons and concluded on September 10, 2015.

== Sources ==
- Spignesi, Stephen (1998). The Lost Work of Stephen King. Birch Lane Press. pp. 131–132. ISBN 1-55972-469-2.
