= Lowestoft Sixth Form College =

Lowestoft 6th Form College
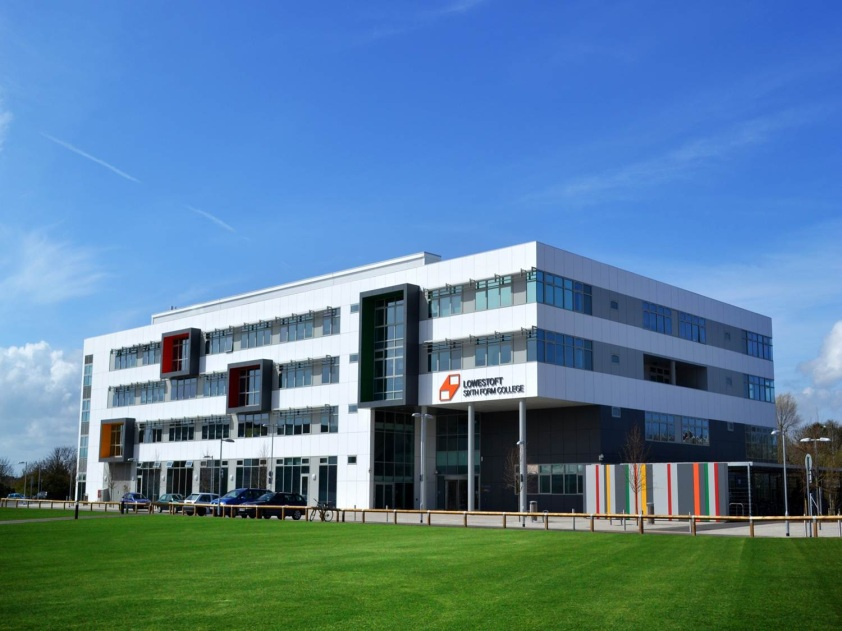

Location
- Rotterdam Road; Lowestoft, Suffolk, East Anglia, England, NR32 2PJ; United Kingdom; 52.4848°N 1.7435°E

Information
- Type: Sixth Form College
- Established: 2011
- Local authority: Suffolk
- Department for Education URN: 136255 Tables
- Ofsted: Reports
- Principal: Kerry Payne
- Gender: Mixed
- Age: 16 to 19
- Website: www.lowestoftsfc.ac.uk

Lowestoft Sixth Form College is a sixth-form college in the town of Lowestoft in the English county of Suffolk. The college opened in September 2011, replacing sixth form provision in the existing high schools in Lowestoft. The college is a member of the Sixth Form College Association, Association of Colleges and the Association of Colleges Eastern Region. The current principal is Mr. David Gartland. Students come to Lowestoft Sixth Form College mainly from high schools in the local area of North Suffolk and South Norfolk.

The college was established to educate students between the ages of 16 and 19. Students study for AS & A-Levels and other qualifications such as BTEC and GCSE.

== History ==
The college replaced the Lowestoft Sixth Form Consortium, a shared sixth form provision which ran at the town's three high schools. A Suffolk County Council School Organisation Review decided that post 16 academic provisions in Lowestoft would be best served by a single institution, rather than through the three high-school based sixth forms at Benjamin Britten High School, Ormiston Denes Academy (formerly The Denes High School) and East Point Academy (formerly Kirkley Community High School).

Capital funding for the College was approved at Ministerial level in December 2009 and building work was soon underway at a cost of £25 million. The College was officially opened on 17 October 2012, by Lord Tollemache the Lord-Lieutenant of Suffolk.

== The building ==
Lowestoft Sixth Form College is a modern purpose-built building. It was designed by Atkins and constructed by Morgan Sindall, it consists of 8060m^{2} of learning space for up to 1000 students. Accommodation is on four floors. In 2012 it was announced as a winner of a Royal Institute of British Architects’ Craftsmanship award. The college was designed to be energy efficient.

Facilities include science laboratories, a music recording studio, dance, drama and art studios as well as general teaching classrooms, pastoral support and a careers-advisory service.
