= Ormiston Denes Academy =

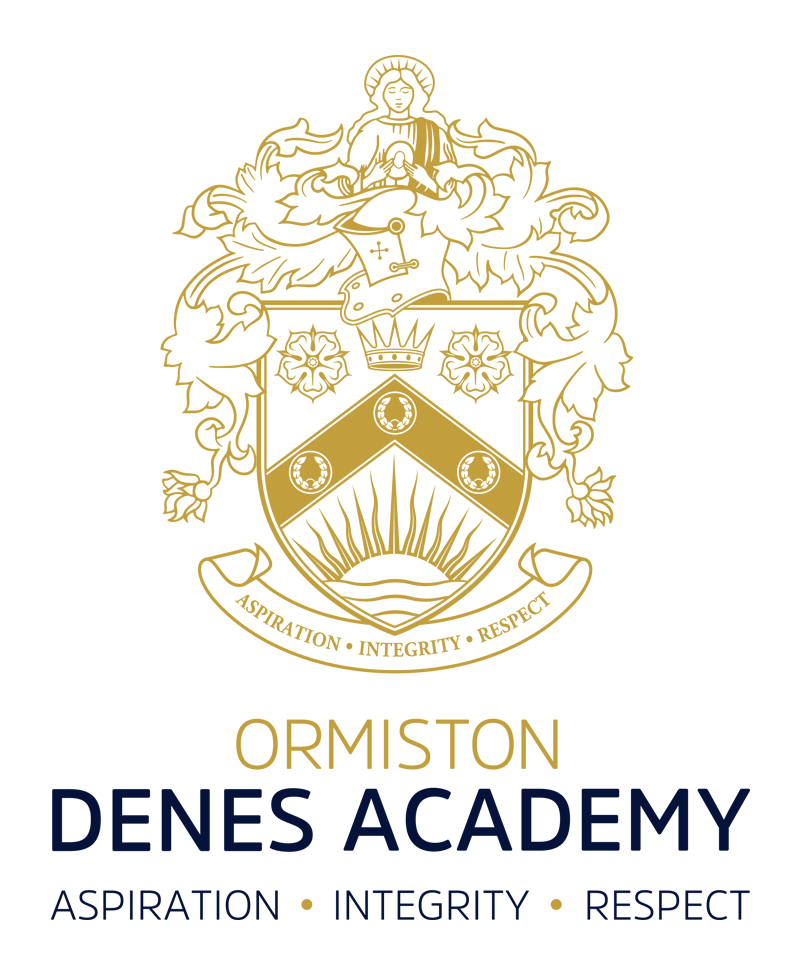

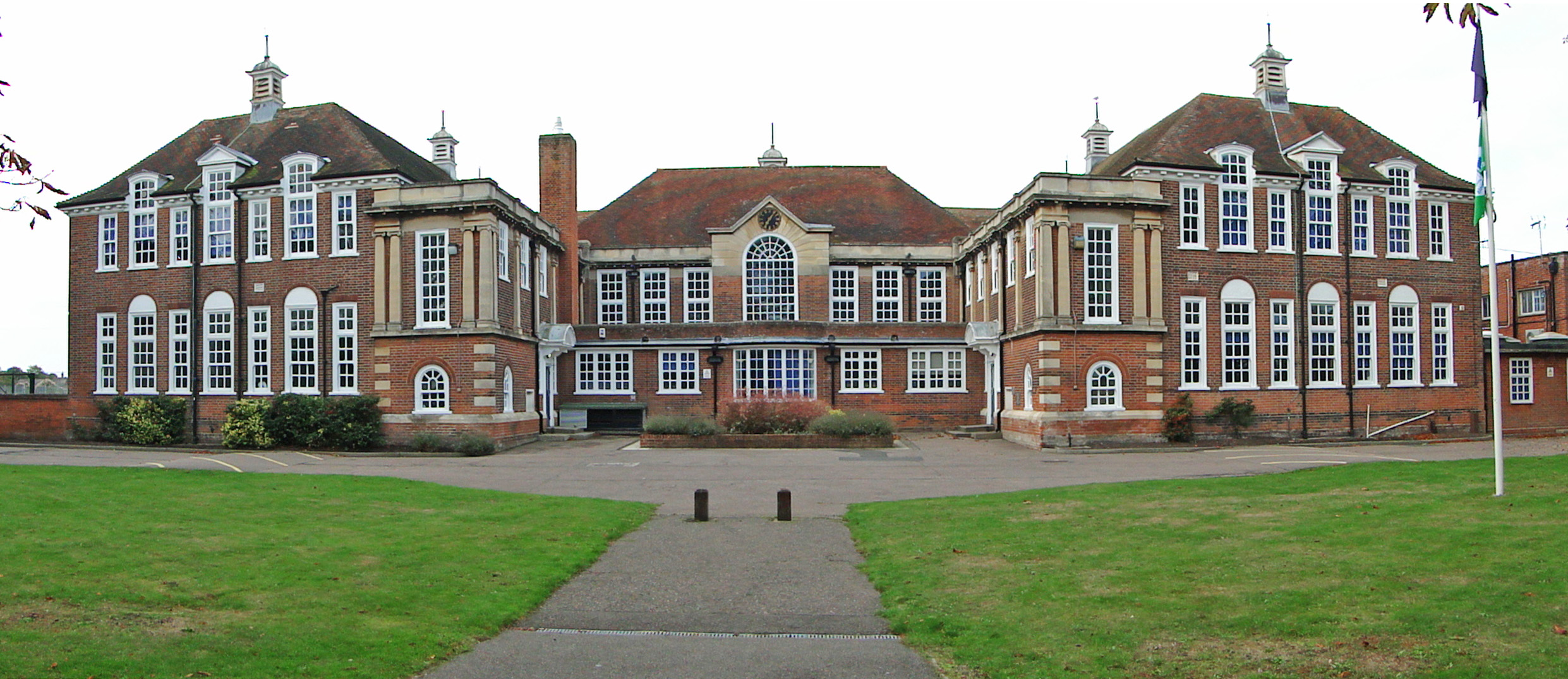

Location
- Yarmouth Road; Lowestoft, Suffolk, NR32 4AH; England; 52°29′23″N 1°44′55″E

Information
- Type: Academy
- Motto: Aspiration, integrity, respect
- Ofsted: Reports
- Principals: Kate Williams
- Gender: Coeducational
- Age: 11 to 16
- Houses: 4
- RSV Ambassador: Amy Butcher
- Website: http://www.ormistondenes.co.uk/

Ormiston Denes Academy is a secondary school with academy status located in the northern outskirts of Lowestoft in the English county of Suffolk. It has around 1000 students aged 11 to 16.

It is situated on Yarmouth Road, the A47. It is also home to a sports training centre open to the public.

== History ==
Located in the historic parish of St Margaret's, the academy's history dates back to 1910 when it was founded as a replacement for a secondary fee-paying day school established in 1904. Built by Brown and Kerr its main building is a Grade II Listed Building with a Queen Anne facade. The school was originally designed to accommodate 320 pupils with the site comprising eleven acres of which seven were playing fields. For the first nine years the school was called the Lowestoft Municipal Secondary School and its aim was to provide a ‘sound education for boys and girls between the ages of 10 and 18’. In 1914, the first school magazine, The Lowestoftian was published, detailing the events of the school. Although it had seen many changes over time The Lowestoftian was discontinued in 2019.

=== Grammar school ===
From 1920 the school was renamed the Lowestoft Secondary School before becoming known as Lowestoft Grammar School from 1945 under the changes of the 1944 Butler Education Act. In June 1940, soon after the start of the Second World War and as a result of the danger from air raids on Lowestoft, 327 pupils together with the Head Master and 21 members of staff were evacuated to Worksop. The return to Lowestoft commenced in 1943 with eventually all returning by July 1944.

After the end of the war there was a population boom, which caused a rapid rise in the number of pupils attending the school. This necessitated a utilitarian building programme in order to accommodate the new pupils. This expansion of the school buildings continued intermittently for the next 30 years.

=== Comprehensive ===
The school became a comprehensive in 1971 and was renamed The Denes High School. As Denes High School, it competed against Kenilworth Grammar School in the Top of the Form radio competition, recorded on Wednesday 17 February 1971. Kenilworth won 44–37.

In September 2004 it was designated by the Department for Education and Skills as a specialist school as a Business and Enterprise College.

=== Loss of sixth form ===
In September 2011 the school became an 11 to 16 school as part of the reorganisation of schools in Lowestoft by Suffolk County Council. Pupils in years 7 and 8 joined the school after the closure of eight middle schools in Lowestoft. The opening of Lowestoft Sixth Form College also meant that the school lost its role in the Lowestoft 6th consortium, which had operated as a shared sixth form between the high schools in the town.

As The Denes High School, it was rated as 'Inadequate' in all four criteria following an Ofsted inspection in September 2012 and was placed into special measures. The headteacher, Peter Marshall, who joined the school in October 2012, led the conversion to academy status in 2013 as part of the Ormiston Academies Trust and the school was renamed Ormiston Denes Academy. The school was taken out of special measures in March 2015 but saw little improvement in its examination results in 2016. On 5 September 2016, Peter Marshall left the school after resigning to "explore other career opportunities closer to home". He was replaced by Ben Driver as interim principal until January 2017, when Mr. Driver was appointed principal Kate Williams is now principal.

== Notable alumni ==
=== The Denes High School ===
- James Mayhew, artist; author and illustrator of children's books
- Sean Harris, actor
- Karl Theobald, actor and comedian
- Zeb Soanes, BBC Radio 4 Newsreader, author and Television Presenter
- Daniel Cooper, journalist

=== Lowestoft Grammar School ===
- Rosemary Ashe, actress/singer
- Dennis Barker, Guardian journalist
- Sir Tim Brighouse, Chief Adviser from 2003–07 for London Schools at the DfES
- Terry Butcher, Ipswich and England footballer
- Claud Castleton, Victoria Cross recipient
- Andrew Marshall, screenwriter, who wrote and created 2point4 Children, wrote Radio 4's 1970s The Burkiss Way (with David Renwick), and was Douglas Adams' inspiration for the character Marvin in The Hitchhiker's Guide to the Galaxy
- Maj-Gen John Milne CB, Colonel Commandant from 2001–07 of the Royal Artillery
- Brendan Neiland, professor of painting, artist
- Tony Palmer, film and theatre director
- David Porter, local Conservative MP from 1987–97 for Waveney
- Eddie Spearritt, Ipswich Town footballer
