= Laterna magica =

Laterna magica may refer to:

- Laterna Magika, a theater in Prague
- Laterna Magica (composition), a composition by Kaija Saariaho
- Laterna Magica, Ingmar Bergman's autobiography

== See also ==
- Magic Lantern (disambiguation)
