= Britten as a Boy =

2025 statue in Lowestoft, Suffolk, England

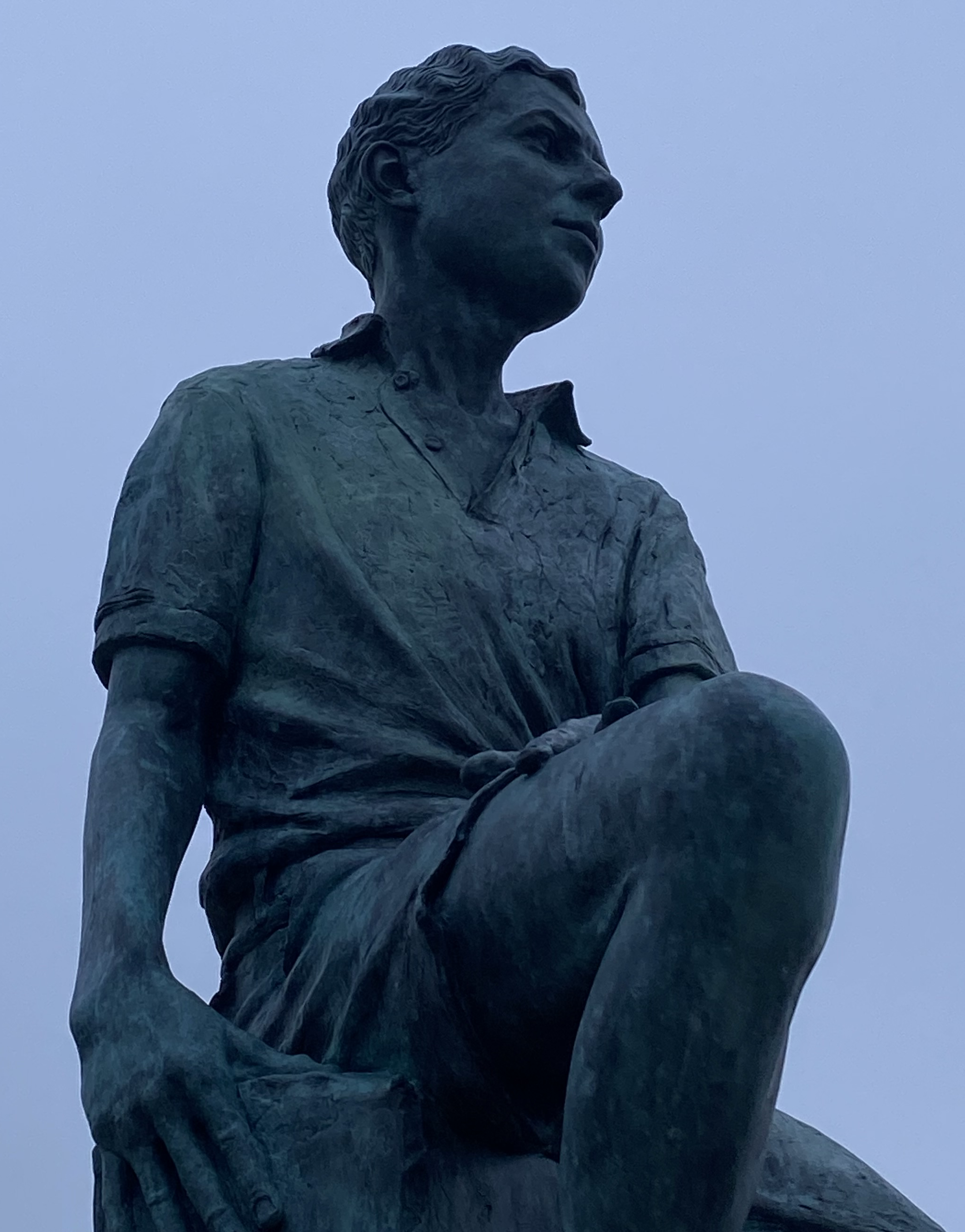
- Britten as a Boy (2025)
- Artist: Ian Rank-Broadley
- Year: 2025
- Medium: Bronze
- Subject: Benjamin Britten
- Location: Lowestoft, Suffolk; 52°27′54.41″N 1°44′40.06″E
- Website: https://www.brittenasaboy.com/

Britten as a Boy is a statue of Benjamin Britten in Lowestoft, Suffolk, England, completed in 2025. It depicts Britten as a teenager looking out to the North Sea, at the age at which his musical talents were first discovered by Frank Bridge.

It was sculpted by Ian Rank-Broadley, who was chosen due to his excellent previous catalogue of sculpture in the medium of bronze.

The statue is situated at Lord Kitchener's Garden in the Kirkley Cliff area of South Lowestoft. It is located close to his childhood home and the school which he had attended as a child. The pose is intended to evoke Britten looking out of his bedroom window, which inspired his work.

The campaign to fund the statue began in April 2022. The cost of the statue and its installation was £120,000.

It was unveiled on 10 November 2025 by English composer John Rutter.

== What Bliss is Home ==
A newly-composed song "What Bliss is Home", with music by composer Ben Parry and lyrics by Zeb Soanes, was performed at the unveiling ceremony. Both composer and lyricist have a link to the county of Suffolk where Britten was born. Parry was born in Ipswich, and Soanes in Lowestoft.
