= Zeb Soanes =

British broadcaster

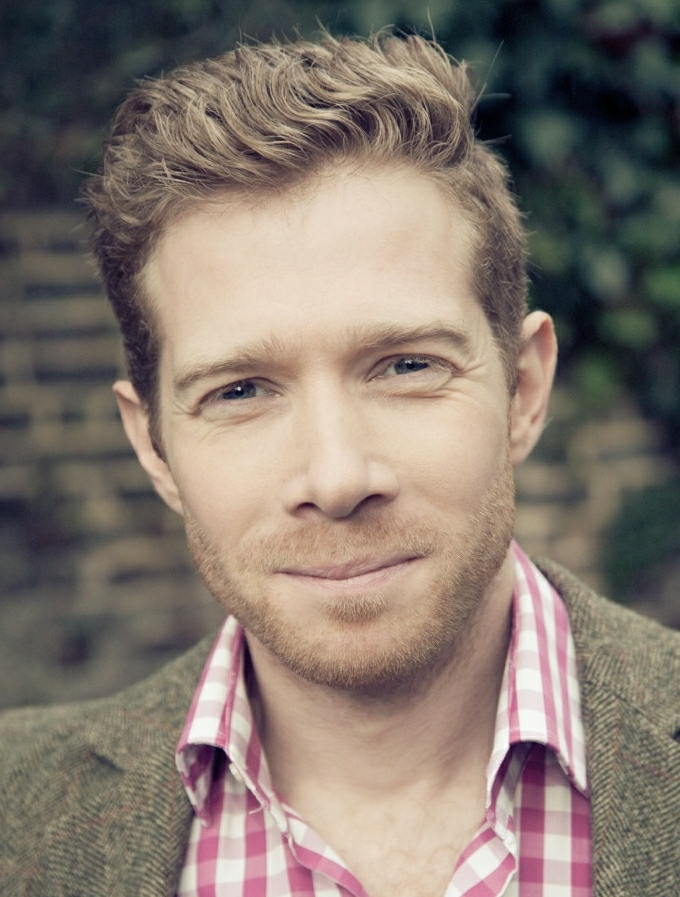
- Soanes in 2014
- Born: 24 June 1976 (age 49); Lowestoft, Suffolk, England
- Education: Harris Middle School, Lowestoft; Denes High School, Lowestoft
- Alma mater: University of East Anglia
- Occupations: Journalist, news reader, radio presenter, author, actor
- Employer: Global Radio
- Notable credit(s): BBC Radio 4 Gaspard the Fox books
- Television: BBC Proms
- Website: zebsoanes.com

Zebedee Soanes (born 24 June 1976) is a British radio presenter and theatre actor who hosts the weekday evening music show Relaxing Evenings with Zeb Soanes on Classic FM.

He was previously a newsreader and continuity announcer on BBC Radio 4 and BBC Radio 4 Extra until June 2022. He presents live concerts, specialising in narrated orchestral works, and has published the children's book series Gaspard the Fox.

== Early life and education ==
Soanes was born in Lowestoft, Suffolk, the son of a Methodist minister and one of three children. He went to Northfield St Nicholas Infants School, Harris Middle School and Denes High School, a state comprehensive school in the town, before studying Drama and Creative Writing at the University of East Anglia. He then taught drama at Langley School and toured Britain as an actor.

== Life and career ==
=== Early career and Shipping Forecast ===
An appearance on BBC Local Radio led to a job as a presentation announcer for the television channels BBC One and BBC Two. His voice launched BBC Four in 2002 and he was the channel's sole announcer for ten months. He left BBC television and took up a position with BBC Radio 4 on 9 February 2003. In 2001 he began reading the Shipping Forecast, a weather report for the seas around the British Isles, which is broadcast four times a day on BBC Radio 4.

He has been engaged to record special forecasts for several TV dramas, including Sherlock, where he adds the new sea area of 'Sherrinford' (a secret facility located in secured waters) and he reads the forecast over the opening titles of the ITV detective series Grace. He also recorded the forecast for Sandi Toksvig's play Silver Lining, produced by English Touring Theatre and for the Royal National Theatre's 2023 production of Odysseus.

=== Later radio career ===
Soanes has been a newsreader for Radio 4's Today, PM and the Six O’Clock News.

He acted with Toby Jones in the radio drama Beautiful Dreamers and has reported for BBC Radio's long-running series From Our Own Correspondent. In December 2010, Radio Times magazine placed Soanes in the list of the seven most recognisable voices in Britain. Author Francesca Simon, creator of Horrid Henry, featured Soanes as the newsreader in The Lost Gods, her 2013 book for older children.

In a 2015 poll of favourite radio voices in The Sunday Times, Soanes was voted as the favourite male voice. His voice was described, by the paper's radio critic Paul Donovan, as smoother than that of the favourite female Jane Garvey and as "evoking an earlier, more formal BBC".

In 2016 Soanes played Derek Nimmo in the radio drama All Mouth and Trousers, by Mark Burgess, the story behind the making of the television comedy series All Gas and Gaiters.

At Christmas 2018 Soanes appeared as part of the team for the University of East Anglia on BBC's Christmas University Challenge. On Christmas Day, the team lost to University of Westminster by 100 points to 130.

In 2022, Soanes joined Classic FM He hosts the weekday evening music show Relaxing Evenings with Zeb Soanes on the station.

=== The Proms and concert performances ===
Soanes returned to BBC Four television in August 2006 as a presenter for the BBC Proms. In 2017 he presented a television tribute to The Proms on the occasion of the First Night of The Proms, with Soanes partly presenting in Received Pronunciation, fitting the style of early BBC programmes.

In November 2013 he took the role of God in a production of Noye's Fludde for BBC Radio 3, as part of the station's celebration of Benjamin Britten's centenary. In November 2014 he appeared in a concert with the vocal ensemble Opus Anglicanum at Wells Cathedral, featuring the poetry of George Herbert. The ensemble toured an entire reading of Coleridge's The Rime of the Ancient Mariner, set to music by Lynne Plowman.

In 2016 Soanes was narrator for The Snowman by the Brandenburg Sinfonia at St Martin-in-the-Fields, with Andrew Earis conductor. In 2019 the church commissioned him to rewrite the libretto for Vaughan Williams' 1958 nativity pageant, The First Nowell, presented as a charity gala casting BBC colleagues Dame Jenni Murray as God and Evan Davis as a Wise Man. He narrated Peter and the Wolf and Little Red Riding Hood at the Wimbledon International Music Festival, with Leo Geyer conducting. The Daily Telegraph has described Soanes as "the go-to person for music narration, specialising in children's concerts". Andrew Baker, son of broadcaster Richard Baker, has said "It is unusual .... for newsreaders to come from a non-journalistic background, but this seems to have been Zeb's path, just as it was my father's, so the state school, university, actor, BBC trajectory is uncannily similar."

In March 2017 Soanes appeared, alongside Carole Boyd, in a new recording of Façade by William Walton and Edith Sitwell, produced by Andrew Keener. Andrew Baker praised Soanes for his performance': "My father regarded Façade as the pinnacle of the narrator's art, a hugely enjoyable challenge, and a celebration of clarity, breathing, projection and timing. Zeb has all of these attributes, and it's always a pleasure to hear him at work."

=== Return to theatre ===
In 2026 Soanes returned to the stage to play his actor hero Sir Alec Guinness in a one-man-show, touring the UK. Soanes had written to Guinness when he was aged 17 and received a handwritten note of encouragement. Two Halves of Guinness, by Mark Burgess, follows Guinness as he reflects on his distinguished but mysterious life and career, including his fears that he would be remembered only for the iconic role of the Jedi Knight Obi-Wan Kenobi in Star Wars. The play, directed by Selina Cadell, opened at the Watermill Theatre, Newbury on 29 January 2026 and transferred to the Park Theatre, London on 20 April. Interviewed in The Guardian, Sir Ian McKellen praised Soanes' "immaculate impersonation" of Sir Alec Guinness. Gyles Brandreth hailed it "a masterly performance" and the theatre critic Lloyd Evans, writing in The Spectator, observed that "Soanes knows how to capture Guinness’ voice and shy facial mannerisms perfectly."

=== Chancellor of the University of Suffolk ===
It was announced on 8 September 2025 that Soanes would be the next Chancellor of the University of Suffolk, succeeding Dr Helen Pankhurst, the great-granddaughter of suffragette Emmeline Pankhurst who spearheaded the movement which won the right for women to vote.

== Charitable work ==
Soanes is patron of a number of charities; Young Sounds UK (formerly Awards for Young Musicians,), the British Association of Performing Arts Medicine, The Mammal Society and the Thaxted Festival.

=== St Martin-in-the-Fields ===
In October 2022 Soanes gifted royalties from his children's book Gaspard's Christmas to support the work of St Martin-in-the-Fields with homelessness. The book, illustrated by James Mayhew, introduces the subject of homelessness to children at a time of year when we are traditionally encouraged to think of others. Soanes said "We wanted to produce a Christmas story with a powerful heartfelt message, promoting kindness in the Christmas spirit." Revd. Dr. Sam Wells, Vicar of St Martin-in-the-Fields said, "Thanks to Zeb and James’ generosity, royalties from the sales of Gaspard’s Christmas will go to St Martin-in-the-Fields Charity in perpetuity, so that we can continue to offer funding for both individuals and organisations, to help people access suitable accommodation and keep it, right across the UK." Gaspard's Christmas was hailed 'Best Charity Book' in The Independent's 2022 roundup of best Christmas books for children.

=== Britten as a Boy Statue ===
In 2022 Soanes launched a community project in his home town of Lowestoft to raise funds for a statue of Benjamin Britten by the sculptor Ian Rank-Broadley, to be located on the seafront opposite the composer's childhood home. The Britten as a Boy staue depicts the young composer at the age of fourteen when his talent was first recognised and encouraged, to serve as a symbol of inspiration to other local children to achieve their aspirations. Soanes launched the fundraising campaign by unveiling the maquette for the statue in the garden of Britten's birthplace, at 21 Kirkley Cliff Road. On 6 October 2023, he hosted a gala fundraiser for the statue, at London's Wigmore Hall, with star performers including Dame Janet Baker, Sir Thomas Allen, Tasmin Little and Alistair McGowan, which raised £20,000.

== Awards and honours ==
=== Doctor of University ===
Soanes was awarded an honorary doctorate from the University of Suffolk in October 2023 for his "outstanding contribution to education, music, media, literature and very public endorsement and celebration of Suffolk."

=== Betjeman Society Award ===
On 14 June 2024 he was presented with the Betjeman Society Award, after giving a performance of Sir John Betjeman's Banana Blush at St James Garlickhythe church in the City of London, to mark the album's 50th anniversary. Steve Jackson, Chairman of the Betjeman Society said: "Zeb is a worthy winner of the Betjeman Society Award. He has brought John Betjeman's words to new audiences and champions Betjeman through his radio programmes and public appearances that are met with rapturous applause. Such imaginative entertainments keep Betjeman in the public eye and remind us of how versatile and relevant his poems are, even in the digital age. Zeb is a true Betjemanian."

=== Lay Canon of St Edmundsbury ===
It was announced on 9 October 2025 that Soanes would be installed as a Lay Canon at St Edmundsbury Cathedral in Suffolk.

== Personal life ==
Soanes's family have lived in Lowestoft since the 18th century. He now lives in Islington, North London with his partner, Christophe. Formerly a resident of Highgate, he was made a Freeman of Highgate, by means of the ancient Swearing on the Horns ceremony, on 25 February 2015, at the Duke's Head public house.

On 1 April 2021, at the age of 44, Soanes suffered a stroke. He has since worked with the Stroke Association to raise awareness of the condition.

== Books ==
In 2018 independent Welsh publisher Graffeg issued, Gaspard the Fox, a collaboration with the illustrator James Mayhew. The book for children focused on an injured urban fox which had appeared at Soanes' home, and which he and his partner befriended.

The third book in the series, Gaspard's Foxtrot has also been adapted as a narrated concert work by the British composer Jonathan Dove in the tradition of Peter and the Wolf, which was filmed by the Royal Scottish National Orchestra as part of its National Schools Concert Programme 2021. It received its world premiere on 29 July 2021 at the Three Choirs Festival, with the Philharmonia Orchestra, conducted by Alice Farnham.

Dove and Soanes collaborated again on Gaspard's Christmas which was premiered at the Usher Hall, Edinburgh with the Royal Scottish National Orchestra on Friday 23 December 2022.

Soanes' fifth book, Fred and the Fantastic Tub-Tub, illustrated by Anja Uhren, was published by Graffeg in March 2022. The story was originally commissioned by the Orpheus Sinfonia as a narrated concert work with music composed by James Marangone. It was premiered at the Queen Elizabeth Hall at London's Southbank Centre on 22 October 2023.

=== Works ===
- Gaspard the Fox. Illustrated by James Mayhew. Graffeg Limited. May 2018. ISBN 978-1912213542.
- Gaspard: Best in Show. Illustrated by James Mayhew. Graffeg Limited. August 2019. ISBN 978-1912654673.
- Gaspard's Foxtrot. Illustrated by James Mayhew. Graffeg Limited. March 2021. ISBN 978-1913134808.
- Gaspard's Christmas. Illustrated by James Mayhew. Graffeg. 3 October 2023. ISBN 978-1-913134-84-6.
- Fred and the Fantastic Tub-Tub. Illustrated by Anja Uhren. Graffeg Limited. March 2022. ISBN 978-1802580808.
- Peter the Cat's Little Book of Big Words. Illustrated by James Mayhew. Gaspard the Fox. 10 November 2023. ISBN 978-1-80258-024-2.

== Discography ==
- An English Music – Opus Anglicanum
- Mediaeval Carols III – Opus Anglicanum, 1999
- The Great and Wide Sea – Opus Anglicanum, 2010
- In Parenthesis – Opus Anglicanum, 2013
- Walton: Façade, Orchid Classics, 2017
- Frederick Delius: Hassan, Chandos Records, 2024
