= Jim Rennie =

- Under the Dome character
- Dean Norris as Jim Rennie
- First appearance: Under the Dome (novel)
- Last appearance: Under the Dome (TV series)
- Created by: Stephen King
- Based on: Dick Cheney, Donald Trump, Adolf Hitler
- Portrayed by: Dean Norris

In-universe information
- Full name: James Rennie
- Nickname: Big Jim
- Title: First Selectman
- Occupation: Used Car Salesman, First Selectman of Chester's Mill
- Family: Jim Rennie Junior (son)
- Spouses: Pauline Verdreaux-Rennie (show), Francine Rennie (novel)
- Religion: Protestant
- Home: Chester's Mill, Maine
- Nationality: American

James "Big Jim" Rennie is a fictional character in American writer Stephen King's 2009 science fiction novel Under the Dome and its 2013 television series of the same name, in which Rennie serves as the primary antagonist.

Rennie owns Jim Rennie's Used Cars in the fictional town of Chester's Mill, Maine, and serves as the town's Second Selectman, with the First and Second Selectmen being Andy Sanders and Andrea Grinnel, respectively. However, Rennie tends to be the single most powerful person on the board, using Sanders and Grinnel as figureheads.

On October 21, Chester's Mill is inexplicably covered by a dome. Soon, the Police Chief, Howard "Duke" Perkins is killed when his pacemaker explodes when he gets near the dome. In reaction to this, Rennie, who opposes Perkins, places Peter Randolph as the new Chief. Randolph is incredibly loyal, and, with the aid of Rennie Junior, his son, and several other provisional officers, takes advantage of the dome to turn the town into a fascist dictatorship.

== Character background ==
Rennie owns Jim Rennie's Used Cars on Route 119 in Chester's Mill. In the book, it is implied that the dealership is not successful, even though Rennie is the wealthiest person in town. Instead, it acts as a front for Rennie's methamphetamine laboratory that he runs alongside Philip Bushey, or "The Chef," and Lester Coggins. His wife, Pauline Verdreaux-Rennie, in the show, left Chester's Mill, but returned after the dome dropped to reunite with her son. There, she is stabbed by Lyle Chamley, her ex-boyfriend, and is shot by Rebecca Pine. However, in the book, his wife is Francine Rennie. Before the events of the story, she starts dying of an unspecified cancer, but Rennie suffocates her with a pillow before she can.

Once the dome drops over Chester's Mill, Rennie becomes de facto dictator, utilising volunteer special deputies to control the town. The special deputies, including his son, Jim Rennie Junior, use extreme force and violence to control anyone not loyal to him. Soon after he takes full control, the president, Barack Obama, assigns Dale Barbara to take control of Chester's Mill from Rennie. As Barbara is never loyal to Rennie, he is arrested for murders that, in reality, Junior committed, and is due to be executed by firing squad.

Rennie orders a raid on a methamphetamine laboratory that he owns, as it has been taken over by Andy Sanders and Philip Bushey, or The Chef. Bushey is killed in the raid and activates an explosive device, exploding a "relatively small chunk" of plastic explosive and over four hundred tanks of propane and methamphetamine making materials, sending an explosion throughout the Dome, killing everyone except for thirty-two people, including Barbara's allies, who gather near the dome with large fans on the other side to blow in oxygen, and Rennie and one of his special deputies, Carter Thibaudeau, are trapped in a fallout shelter under the town hall, with lethal air outside.

Thibaudeau realizes that there is only enough oxygen for seventy hours, but one hundred if he kills Rennie. He attempts to shoot Rennie, who, after pretending to pretending to pray, kills him with a kitchen knife. Later, when Rennie is trying to replace the propane for the generator, he is visited by hallucinations of all the people he has previously killed, and suffers a heart attack while asphyxiating in the toxic air outside.

== Inspiration ==
Rennie is based on various real-life politicians, such as Donald Trump and former vice president Dick Cheney. He is corrupt, doing very little for the good of the town, laundering funds through the town church's funds, and misappropriating town funds. Once the dome drops, he steals propane from the hospital to continue running his methamphetamine lab, leaving the hospital and his own house to run out of propane for their generators. He stops alcohol sales and reduces medication distribution, so he can use them to control people, especially Third Select woman Andrea Grinnel, who is addicted to Oxycodone. After Dale Barbara is arrested, he calls for his unlawful execution, such as Trump has done in various tweets. He threatens Barbara with waterboarding in order to get information, as Cheney did.

Throughout the book, he is compared to Adolf Hitler, with the special deputies he hires, including his son, using unnecessary force and assaulting people repeatedly and being compared to by numerous characters with the Hitler Youth. Also, several characters, half the town, wear blue "amnesty" armbands, as do many of the newer special deputies, to represent that they support Rennie, similar to the Nazi armbands.

== Reception ==
Rennie has largely been received well, being described as Norris as a "great character." However, he has been described as a comic super villain and unnecessarily evil.
