= Statue of Diana, Princess of Wales =

Statue in London, United Kingdom

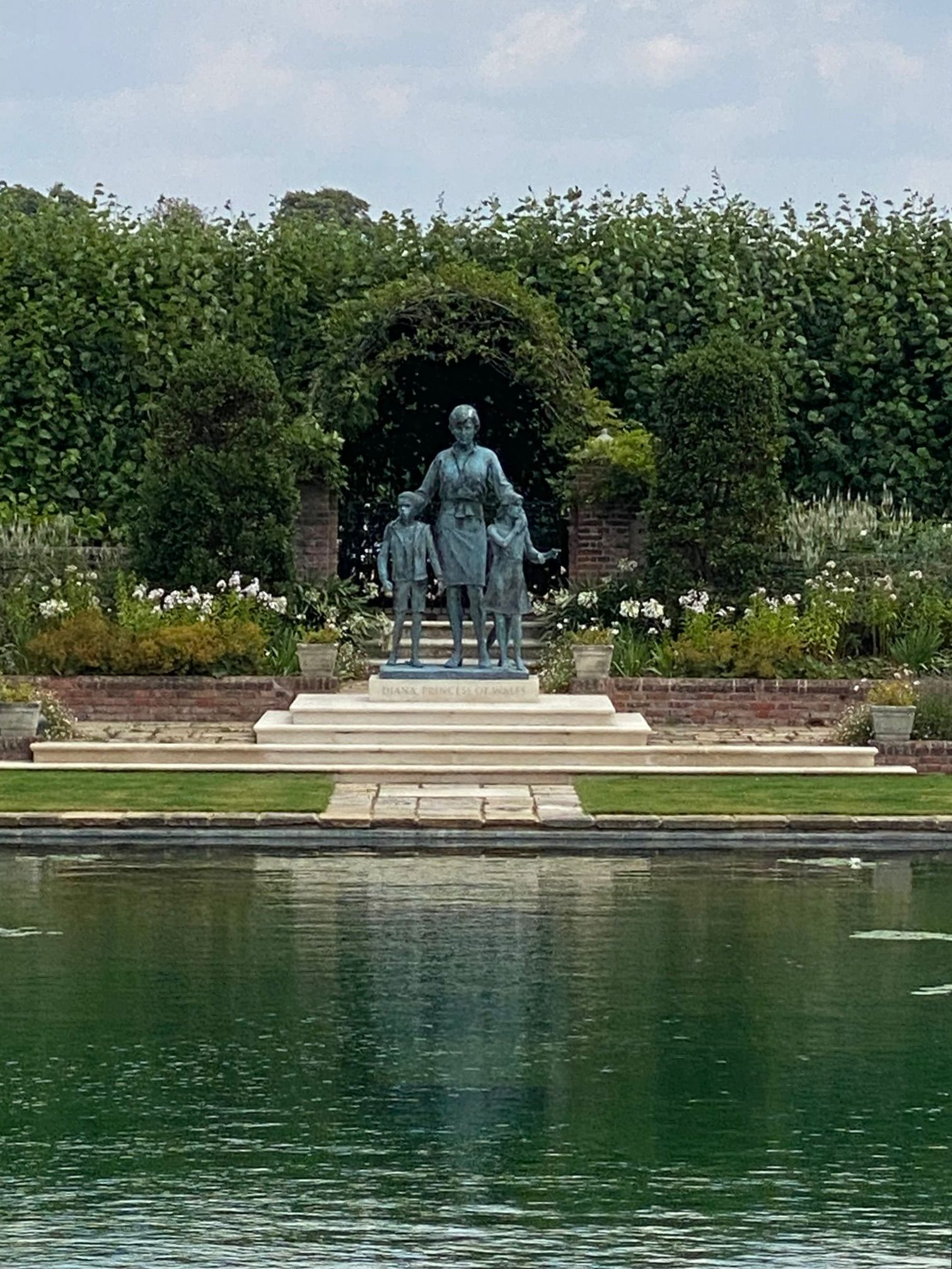
- Interactive map of Statue of Diana, Princess of Wales
- Location: Kensington Palace
- Coordinates: 51.50575°N 0.1866°W
- Designer: Ian Rank-Broadley
- Type: Memorial
- Material: Bronze
- Opening date: 1 July 2021
- Dedicated to: Diana, Princess of Wales

A statue of Diana, Princess of Wales is located in the Sunken Garden of London's Kensington Palace. Commissioned by Diana's two sons William and Harry on the 20th anniversary of her death, the statue was designed and executed by sculptor Ian Rank-Broadley and placed in the newly redesigned garden by Pip Morrison before being unveiled as a memorial to Diana on 1 July 2021, which would have been on her 60th birthday.

== Background ==
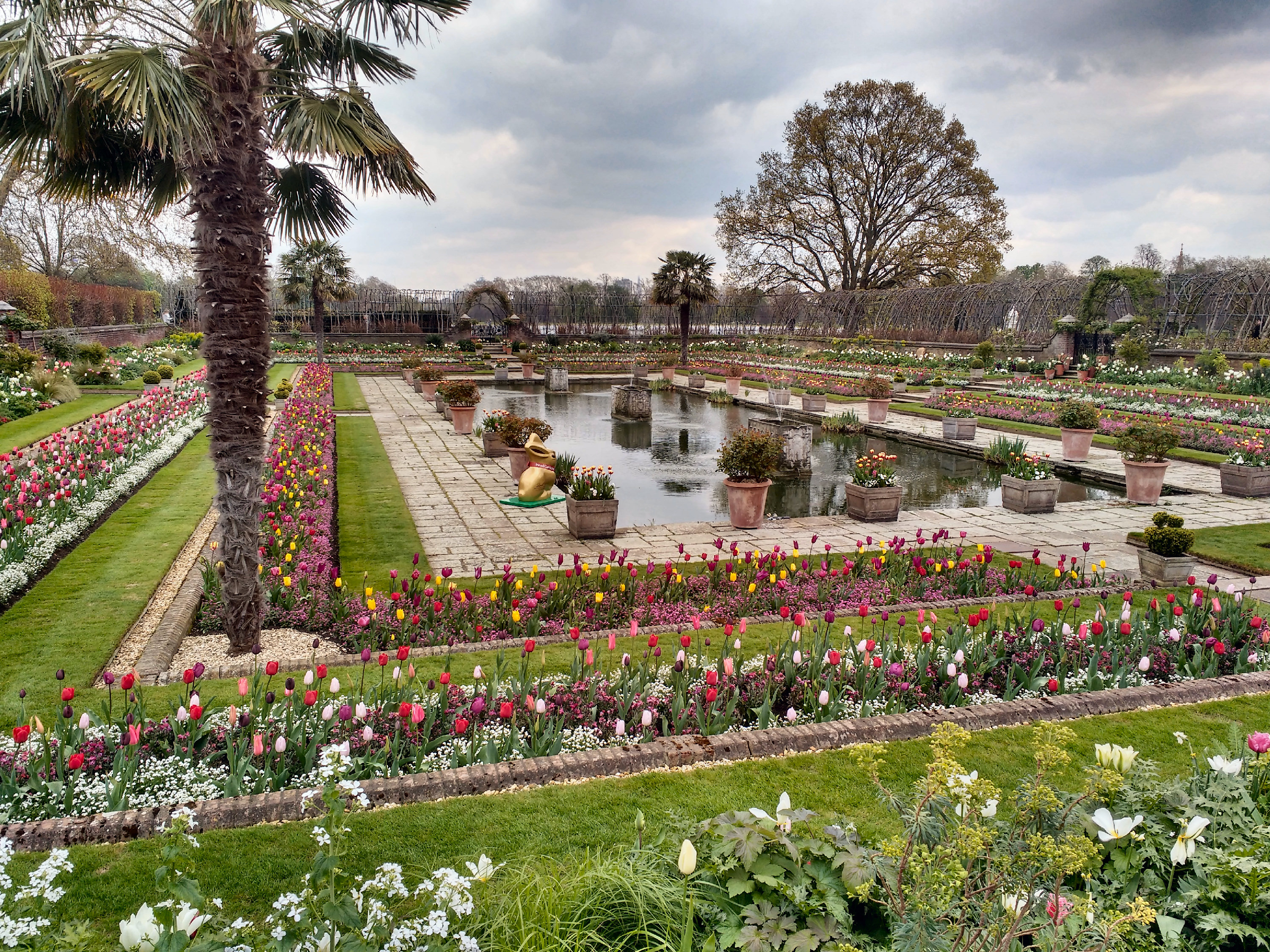
The Sunken Garden in 2019, where the statue stands

In 2017, Diana's two sons commissioned a statue of their mother for Kensington Palace to commemorate the 20th anniversary of her death. In an official statement released by Kensington Palace, Prince William and Prince Harry said "Our mother touched so many lives. We hope the statue will help all those who visit Kensington Palace to reflect on her life and her legacy." The money was raised through public donations, and a small committee consisting of close friends and advisers, including Diana's older sister, Lady Sarah McCorquodale, were said to be working on the project. At the time, the BBC's royal correspondent Peter Hunt wrote, "This national monument to the wife of one future king and the mother of another has been a long time coming. The Queen Mother statue was unveiled seven years after her death." It was announced that Ian Rank-Broadley had been commissioned to execute the statue of Diana. Its completion was initially expected in 2019.

== Design ==
These are the units to measure the worth
Of this woman as a woman regardless of birth.
Not what was her station?
But had she a heart?
How did she play her God-given part?

— The extract from The Measure of a Man by Wallace Gallaher, carved on the paving stone in front of the statue

The statue was unveiled by William and Harry on 1 July 2021, on what would have been Diana's 60th birthday, and shows her surrounded by three children "who represent the universality and generational impact of the Princess's work". It is situated in the middle of one end of the Sunken Garden, newly redesigned by Pip Morrison. Work on redesigning the garden began in 2019; five gardeners planted over 4,000 individual flowers, including many forget-me-nots, Diana's favourite flower, along with "ballerina and blush noisette roses, white triumphator and china pink tulips, lavender, dahlias, and sweet peas". A paving stone in front of the statue features an extract from the poem The Measure of a Man by Wallace Gallaher, previously used in the memorial service to commemorate the 10th anniversary of Diana's death in 2007.

== Reception ==
In his review, the critic Jonathan Jones noted its "aesthetic awfulness ... Flat, cautious realism softened by a vague attempt to be intimate make this a spiritless and characterless hunk of nonsense." Lily Waddell in the Evening Standard called it "beautiful", and that it "captured the people's princess in action and her kind heart". Tristram Fane Saunders from The Daily Telegraph criticised the choice of poem for the paving stone, stating that the extract from "a poem that was already mediocre has been made worse" by disrupting the rhythm and turning "To measure the worth/ Of a man as a man" into "to measure the worth/ Of this woman as a woman".

== See also ==
- Diana, Princess of Wales Memorial Fountain
