= Tim Brighouse =

British educator (1940–2023)

Sir Tim Brighouse
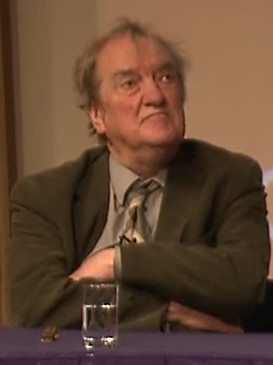
- Brighouse in 2012
- Born: 15 January 1940; Leicestershire, England
- Died: 15 December 2023 (aged 83)
- Education: University of Oxford (PGCE)
- Occupation: Educator
- Children: 4

Sir Timothy Robert Peter Brighouse (15 January 1940 – 15 December 2023) was a British educator. He was the Schools Commissioner for London between 2002 and 2007, where he led the London Challenge.

== Early life and career ==
Brighouse was born in Leicestershire on 15 January 1940. He was brought up there and in East Anglia, and was educated at Loughborough Grammar School, Lowestoft County Grammar School and St Catherine's College, Oxford. Brighouse took his PGCE at the Oxford University Department of Education in 1961. He began his career as a schoolteacher, becoming a deputy head in a South Wales secondary modern school in 1966.

In the early 1970s he worked for Buckinghamshire County Council's education department, and worked with Geoff Cooksey on plans for Stantonbury Campus, the first secondary school of Milton Keynes.

Later he was Professor of Education at Keele University (1989–1993), and Chief Education Officer in both Oxfordshire (1978–1989) and Birmingham Local Authorities.

Whilst he was at Birmingham, he was described by Conservative Education Secretary John Patten as a "madman ... wandering the streets, frightening the children". Brighouse sued and won substantial damages, which he donated to charity. He used some of it to set up the University of the First Age, to encourage out of hours activities to enrich school children's learning.

In May 1997 Brighouse was awarded an honorary degree from the Open University as Doctor of the university.

Brighouse was the Schools Commissioner for London between 2002 and 2007, where he led the London Challenge.

Brighouse was a Non-Executive Director of RM plc the UK educational IT company.

Brighouse was knighted in the 2009 New Year Honours.

== Personal life ==
Tim Brighouse was married to Elizabeth, who is leader of the Labour group on Oxfordshire County Council. They had four children and eight grandchildren. Brighouse died on 15 December 2023, at the age of 83.

== Books and articles ==
- Brighouse, Tim; Woods, David (1999). How to Improve Your School. Routledge. ISBN 978-0-415-19442-6.
- Brighouse, Tim (2006). Inspirations: A Collection of Commentaries and Quotations to Promote School Improvement. Continuum. ISBN 978-1-85539-215-1.
- Brighouse, Tim (2008). The Joy of Teaching. Continuum. ISBN 978-1-85539-339-4.
- Brighouse, Tim; Woods, David (2008). What Makes a Good School Now?. Network Continuum Education. ISBN 978-1-85539-456-8.
- Brighouse, Tim; Woods, David (2013). The A–Z of School Improvement: Principles and Practice. Bloomsbury Education. ISBN 978-1-4411-4569-7.
- Brighouse, Tim (2020). "A 'national education service': what can we learn from the past?". In Hudson, Brian; Leask, Marilyn; Younie, Sarah (eds.). Education System Design: Foundations, Policy Options and Consequences. Routledge. ISBN 978-0-367-20312-2.
- Brighouse, Tim; Waters, Mick (2022). About Our Schools: Improving on Previous Best. Crown House Publishing. ISBN 978-1-78583-595-7.
