= Alexander Ardakov =

- Born: Kuybyshev, Soviet Union
- Genres: Classical
- Occupation: Musician
- Instrument: Piano
- Years active: 1981–present

Alexander Ardakov (Russian: Александр Ардаков) (born in Samara, Russia, formerly Kuybyshev) is a Russian professional pianist, graduate of the Moscow Conservatoire and prizewinner at the Viotti International competition in Italy (1984). Between 1981 and 1991 he played with the Moscow State Philharmonia. Since 1991, he has lived in London, working as Professor of Piano at Trinity College of Music, London.

He has performed for BBC Radio 3 and Classic FM, and made numerous CD recordings, including pieces by Chopin, Tchaikovsky, Mozart and Sergei Rachmaninoff - he has recorded Rachmaninoff's Second Piano Concerto with the Royal Philharmonic Orchestra, conducted by Sir Alexander Gibson.

Ardakov has toured in France, Germany, Austria, Poland, Portugal, Denmark, the USA, Turkey, Israel, Japan and the UK.

== Discography ==
Title	Label	Date
Maxim Fedotov (violin), Alexander Ardakov - R. Strauss, O. Respighi sonatas	Melodiya	1988
Maxim Fedotov (violin), Alexander Ardakov – Taneyev, Prokofiev & Bartók sonatas	MCA Classics	1992
Alexander Ardakov, Glinka/Chopin/Scriabin	Great Hall	1993
Alla Ablaberdyeva (soprano), Alexander Ardakov – Tchaikovsky songs	Postern Park Digital	1994
Alexander Ardakov plays Bach, Schumann and Chopin	Great Hall	2000
Sergei Rachmaninoff / Pyotr Tchaikovsky, Alexander Ardakov, Royal Philharmonic Orchestra, Sir Alexander Gibson – Piano Concerto No. 2 In C Minor Opus 18 / Grand Sonata Opus 37 / Èlégie Opus 3	Great Hall	2001
Piano : Chopin - Three Nocturnes / Barcarole Op. 60, Liszt - Six Grand Etudes After Paganini	Great Hall	2006
