= Benjamin Britten Academy =

Benjamin Britten Academy of Music & Mathematics

Location
- Blyford Road; Lowestoft, East Anglia, Suffolk, NR32 4PZ; England
- Coordinates: 52.49747°N 1.73164°E

Information
- Type: Academy
- Motto: Discamus ut serviamus (We learn that we might serve)
- Religious affiliation: Christian
- Local authority: Suffolk
- Specialist: Music
- Department for Education URN: 142759 Tables
- Ofsted: Reports
- Headmaster: James McAtear
- Gender: Mixed
- Age: 11 to 16
- Enrolment: 800
- Website: http://benjaminbritten.school/

Benjamin Britten Academy (formerly The Benjamin Britten High School) is a coeducational secondary school located in the northern outskirts of Lowestoft, Suffolk, England. It caters for scholars aged 11 to 16. It is also home to the Suffolk Centre of Excellence in Mathematics.

The school was named after the Lowestoft-born composer Benjamin Britten and was designed as he approached his death in 1974. Its modernist design reflected the style of his compositions and remains distinctive in its layout and intended black and white colour scheme. The school was completed in 1979.

In September 2011 the school became an 11 to 16 school as part of the reorganisation of schools in Lowestoft by Suffolk County Council. Pupils in years 7 and 8 joined the school after the closure of eight middle schools in Lowestoft. The opening of Lowestoft Sixth Form College also meant that the school lost its role in the Lowestoft 6th consortium, which had operated as a shared sixth form between the high schools in the town.

Previously a Local Authority school administered by Suffolk County Council, in May 2016, the Benjamin Britten High School was converted to academy status. It was granted 11-18 Sixth Form status, as part of the Hartismere family of schools. The school continues to coordinate with Suffolk County Council for admissions.

The academy was awarded a rating of 'good' from Ofsted in 2019, as an improvement from its previous rating of 'Special measures'.

== Suffolk Centre of Excellence in Mathematics ==
Peter Aldous, MP for Waveney, opened the school's Centre for Excellence in Mathematics on 5 July 2016. The centre occupies its own specialist accommodation, the Foxborough building, and is intended to remedy the perceived shortage of specialist mathematics teachers in the Waveney Valley area. It is distinctive in having a mathematics library and five specialist mathematics computing suites.

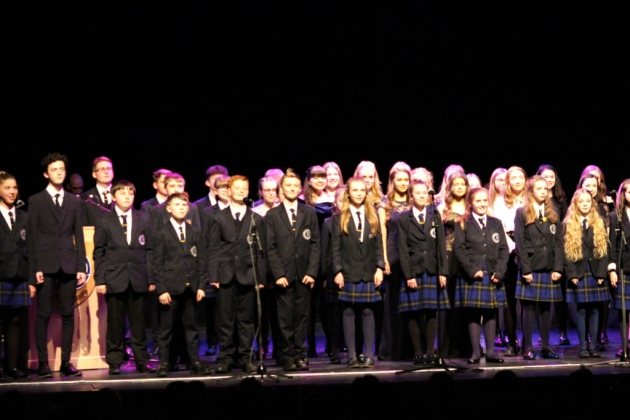
Choir Perform at 2017 Awards Ceremony

== Music academy ==
With the sponsorship of the Britten-Pears Foundation the school operates as a specialist music academy offering scholarships to those with a particular aptitude and love of music and the performing arts. As part of this arrangement a new dance studio, green room, community lounge with kitchens, recording studio and additional music practice rooms were added along with a refurbished theatre. The Britten Theatre forms the centre piece of the music academy's work in the performing arts.

== Hartismere family of schools ==
Hartismere School was given sponsor academy status on 1 September 2010, the first in England to receive this status. In 2016 the multi-academy trust was set up. This became known as the Hartismere family of schools. On 1 May 2016 the Benjamin Britten Music Academy and Centre of Excellence in mathematics became part of the Hartismere Family.
