= Magic Lantern (charity) =

UK educational charity

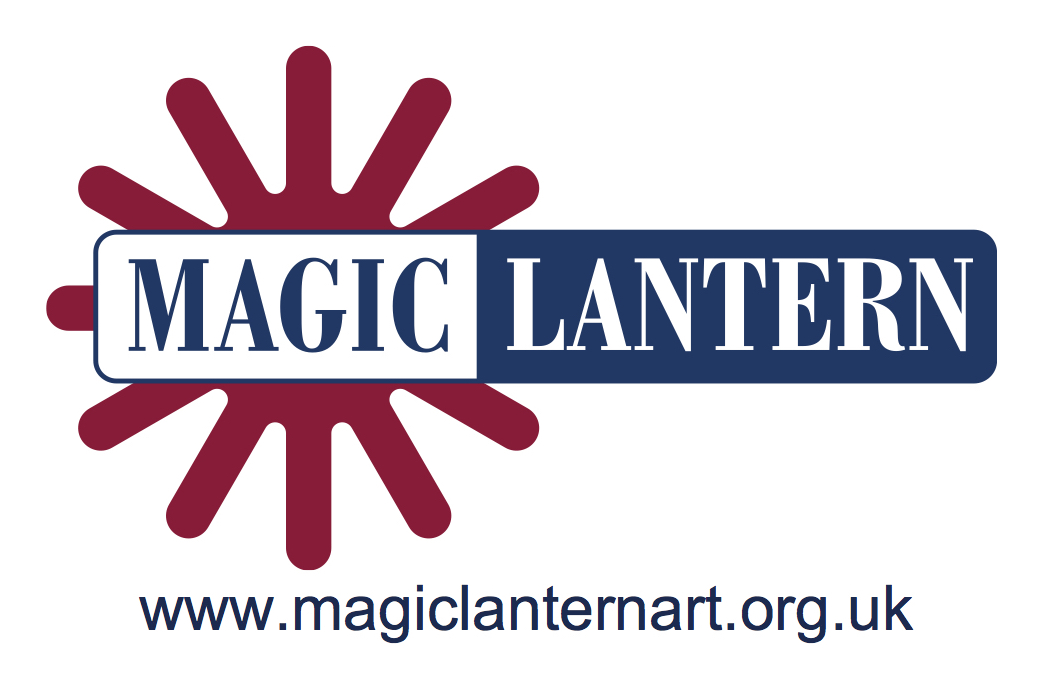
Official logo designed by Jake Tilson

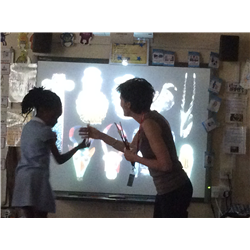
Magic Lantern team member, Helen Anderson, running an interactive art history workshop in Reigate, April 2016. Reported by Reigate Arts Society. http://www.reigatedfas.org.uk/OtherActivities/YoungArts.aspx

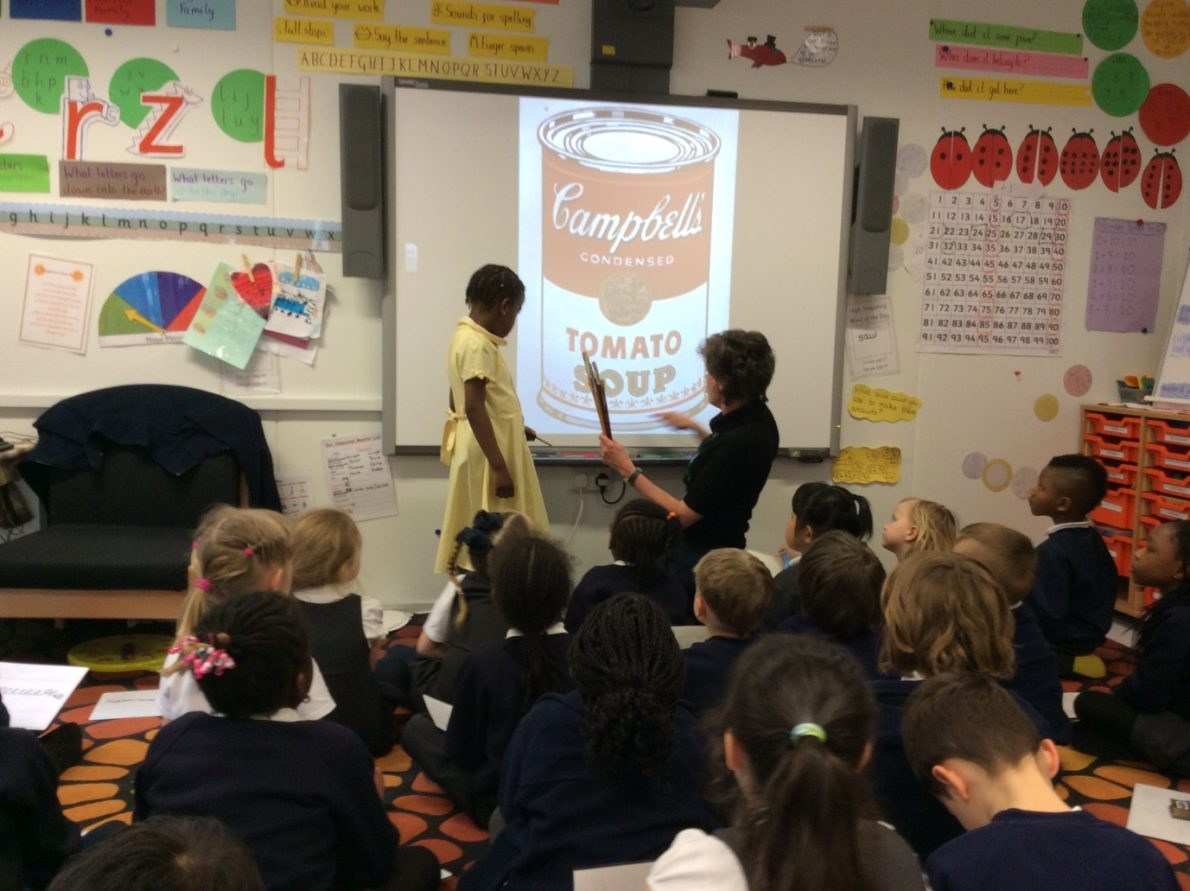
Magic Lantern workshop leader, Helen Anderson, leads a workshop on Pop Art for a year 1 class in Albion Primary School, London Borough of Southwark http://www.albionprimaryschool.co.uk/class-news/tangerine/the-magic-lantern-art-workshop

Magic Lantern is an educational charity in the United Kingdom. It was founded by Diana Schomberg in 1994. The charity delivers interactive art history workshops in schools throughout England.

The charity's remit is to introduce children to art and make art accessible to anyone. Alongside its work in schools, Magic Lantern also works with adult groups in centres including prisons, hospices and homeless centres.

== History ==
Retired school teacher Diana Schomberg set up the charity in 1994 with a grant from Marks and Spencer. Subsequent sponsors of the charity have included The Arts Society (formerly NADFAS), the Aldgate and Allhallows Foundation, Newcomen Collett Foundation, The Woodward Charitable Trust, The Garfield Weston Foundation, and The Gillian Dickinson Trust.

One of Magic Lantern's former workshop leaders was curator, author, editor, and educationist Ingrid Beazley.

In 2010 Matthew Sanders became Magic Lantern's director.

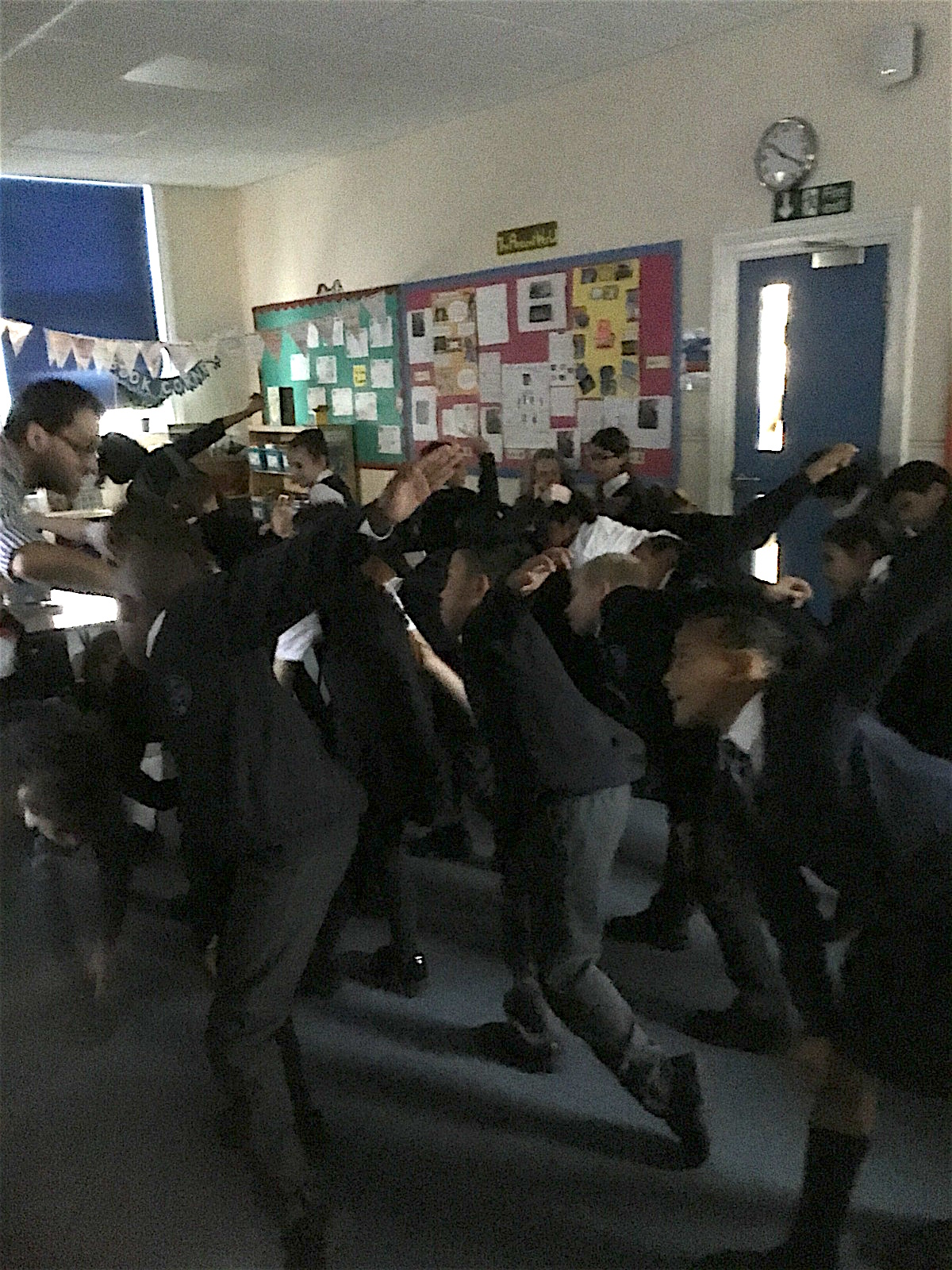
Children from Rosary RC Primary School, LEA Camden, pose as the Discobolus during a Magic Lantern workshop on Ancient Greece. Reported in First News 15–21 December 2017.

On 16 June 2013 Magic Lantern ran pop-up family workshops in London's Trafalgar Square as part of Sky Arts Portrait Artist of the Year.

In 2016 Magic Lantern ran a series of sessions for children in the paediatric ward of the Harley Street Clinic on the subject of "Feelings."

In 2018 Magic Lantern's workshop leaders Pippa Bell and Margaret Bodley Edwards ran a series of workshops for refugees and asylum seekers in Westgate Baptist Church in Newcastle.

HENI Talks selected Magic Lantern to feature in its 2018 Christmas film which was filmed in Holmleigh Primary School in Hackney, north London.

As of September 2022 the charity has 10 workshop leaders and six trustees and operates in Devon, Essex, Gloucestershire, Greater London, Herefordshire, Kent, Northumberland, Oxfordshire, Surrey, Tyne and Wear, Worcestershire and Cyprus.

== Patrons ==
In 2013 William Vaughan, Professor Emeritus of History of Art, Birkbeck College, London, became Magic Lantern's first patron. In 2014 children's author and illustrator James Mayhew became its second. In 2019 actor Bill Murray became a patron, followed in 2020 by art and cultural historian Dr Janina Ramirez.

== Awards ==
In 2011 Magic Lantern was awarded the Inspire Mark by LOCOG (London Organising Committee of the Olympic and Paralympic Games) for its workshop "The Olympic Games, Past and Present." By the end of the project, Magic Lantern workshop leaders had given a total of 627 of these workshops in 103 schools in 32 Local Education Authorities reaching approximately 18,800 children.

In 2019 Magic Lantern was awarded with a JM Barrie Members' Award by Action for Children's Arts for "25 years of helping people to observe and explore the world around them and to think creatively and critically through a series of art history workshops."
