= Magic Lantern (theater) =

Coordinates: 44°3′14.98″N 70°42′30.26″W

The Magic Lantern is a movie theater in Bridgton, Maine, United States. It was demolished due to a sinkhole located on-site. The theater reopened at its new location on February 8, 2008.

== Original Magic Lantern ==
The original theater, which had a Victorian-style lobby, opened in 1929 as the "New Meserve Theater" followed by "The Mayfair", "The Brookside" and finally in 1977 "The Magic Lantern" by entrepreneur Tom Goodman. Goodman secured the worldwide premier of author Stephen King's The Shining at the Magic Lantern. King pulled the strings to get the print for this benefit screening for the local hospital fundraiser. The Magic Lantern was also the first theater in Maine to install Dolby Stereo Surround sound.

The theater closed in the late 1980s and was run for a year by the town of Bridgton's recreation department. The following year the local Howell family purchased the building. The family business, Down East, Inc., had occupied the ground floor for many years while the theater occupied the 2nd floor. The family decided to reopen the single screen theater and to bring movies back to Bridgton.

In 1990, the theater was twinned to increase the number of movie choices. However, the condition of "The Brookside Building" as it was known by locals, had deteriorated due to poor soil conditions that existed on the site. Sloping floors, cracked foundations, freezing pipes and the physical sinking of the building sealed its fate.

On February 7, 2006, the theater was torn down. Down East, Inc. presented to the Town of Bridgton a plan to redevelop the entire site which included a new building for its operations on the site behind the old theater and a New Magic Lantern theater.

== New Magic Lantern ==
The new Magic Lantern officially began construction on March 1, 2007, and reopened on February 8, 2008. It features four screens (three with old fashioned balconies. The other screen is featured as a pub/café, and can be used to show live, televised events. The largest theater features a stage, and has been used for performances, including Brews and Belly Laughs comedy series. Three of the screens are named after former Bridgton Theaters: The Meserve, The Mayfair, and The Brookside. The Brookside has nautical theming, the Meserve has 1920's theming, and the Mayfair has general Victorian theming. The pub, called the Tannery, is named after the Gibb's Tannery that used to be located on the site. It has a Medieval European theme, with dishes being named after the movie Monty Python and the Holy Grail. The Tannery (now known as Web's Common) has since shut down in February of 2025 and is being used as a center for community events (comedy shows, birthday parties, live music, etc) in addition to being used as a 4th theater.
