= Haymarket Square (band) =

- Origin: Chicago
- Genres: Psychedelic rock
- Years active: 1967–1974
- Past members: Gloria Lambert; Marc Swenson; Robert Homa; John Kowalski; Ken Pitlik; Robert Miller

Haymarket Square was a Chicago-based psychedelic rock band in the late 1960s and early 1970s. Their album, Magic Lantern, released in 1968, was pressed in an edition of 80 - 100 copies, and despite its rarity is well considered by fans of psychedelic rock music even today. The music of the album was used to accompany the Baron and Bailey Light Circus at the Museum of Contemporary Art. Magic Lantern was reissued on CD by Gear Fab Records in 2001.

== History ==
In 1967, drummer John Kowalski and guitarist Bob Homa were in a Chicago-area garage band called the Real Things. When the Real Things broke up, they decided to form a new band, and placed ads in several newspapers, seeking additional musicians. On the strength of their auditions, Marc Swenson became the lead guitarist, and Gloria Lambert the lead vocalist. Homa switched from guitar to bass.

The new band named themselves Haymarket Square, a reference to the 1886 Haymarket Square Riot. They soon became popular and played at various venues in the Chicago area. They performed on the same bill as more well-known groups, including the Yardbirds and Cream. In 1968, they played as part of the Baron and Bailey Light Circus, a sound and light show that was produced by two college professors, and which was performed at Chicago's Museum of Contemporary Art. Later that year, the band's only album, Magic Lantern, was released by Chaparral Records, but not put on general sale, instead being used for promotion and handed out to some MCA visitors.

After the recording of Magic Lantern, Homa left the band, and was replaced by bassist Ken Pitlik. Robert Miller joined the band and played rhythm guitar. This reconfigured lineup stayed together until Haymarket Square disbanded in 1974.

Gloria Lambert and Marc Swenson married, had two sons, and subsequently divorced. Lambert works at a high school in Wisconsin as a Spanish and English teacher. Bob Homa received his bachelor's degree in architecture and has spent most of his career managing projects in shopping mall development and renovation.

== Magic Lantern ==
Magic Lantern

Studio album by Haymarket Square
- Released: 1968
- Genre: Psychedelic rock
- Length: 46:56
- Label: Chaparral
- Producer: Haymarket Square

=== Critical reception ===
Professional ratings
Review scores
Source	Rating
Allmusic	2.5/5 stars

On Allmusic, Dean McFarlane wrote, "From the opening cut, it is fairly apparent why the original album is so sought after — Magic Lantern is as fine a display of American psychedelia as late-'60s albums by It's a Beautiful Day and Jefferson Airplane. This will appeal to fans of the fuzzed-out guitar antics of Cream and Blue Cheer."

=== Track listing ===
Side 1

1. "Elevator" (Gloria Lambert) – 7:06
2. "Train Kept A-Rollin' (Tiny Bradshaw, Howard Kay, Lois Mann) – 7:20
3. "Ahimsa" (Marc Swenson, John Kowalski, Robert Homa) – 8:14

Side 2

1. "Amapola" (Swenson) – 10:43
2. "Phantasmagoria" (Lambert) – 4:08
3. "Funeral" (Lambert) – 9:23

=== Personnel ===
==== Haymarket Square ====
- Gloria Lambert – vocals
- Marc Swenson – guitar, vocals
- Robert Homa – bass, vocals
- John Kowalski – drums

==== Production ====
- Recording engineer – Laddie Oleson
- Photography – Bill Bailey, Bill Baron, Gerald Wenner
- Management – Dan Kovacevic
- Equipment manager – John Rantz
