= John Lepper (economist) =

New Zealand economist (born 1946)

John Lepper (born 1946, in Worthing, West Sussex) is an economist based in Aotearoa, New Zealand. He was chief economist of the Bank of New Zealand, economic advisor to the Leader of the NZ NewLabour Party and NZ Alliance Party when in opposition and in government, and economic advisor to the Deputy Prime Minister of New Zealand.

== Background ==
Lepper has a PhD in economics from University of Surrey, England, on "Causality in Economics" gained in 1971, with Professor G.L.S. Shackle as external examiner.

== Career ==
During and after his doctoral studies Lepper taught economics at various institutions including University of Surrey, City of London Polytechnic, and University of Maryland, Upper Heyford Airforce Base, in the UK, and the University of Auckland, in Aotearoa, where Alan Bollard was one of his students.

From 1976 to 1981 he was an Economic Researcher in the London office of Nomura Research Institute (NRI), where he was the first non-Japanese analyst. During his time at Nomura, Lepper was the founding London Editor of "Nomura Investment Review", and represented NRI at Kiel University seminars on the world economy and at Independent Treasury Economic Model group (ITEM) forecasting meetings.

In mid-1981, Lepper moved back to Aotearoa to take up the position as chief economist of the Bank of New Zealand (BNZ), a position he held until 1988. During the 1980s and 1990s he was also a visiting lecturer in economics at Te Herenga Waka—Victoria University of Wellington.

After leaving the BNZ, Lepper formed the independent economic consultancy firm, Integrated Economic Services Ltd (IES), with fellow former-BNZ economist Petrus Simons and prominent economist Len Bayliss. IES operated from 1988 - 2003 and was founded on the importance of integrating politics, and other considerations such as technology, into economic thinking. IES has been described in 1989 as one of the 'big players in the game' of economic forecasting and more recently specifically as a 'forecasting group', in reality the forecasting work of IES consisted of less than ten percent of total business with contracted economic consulting being the firm's primary focus. This included providing economic advice to the NewLabour Party and then to the Alliance Party.

From the mid 1980s, Lepper formed an association with Jim Anderton, with whom he worked closely until 2003. The public record of their association begins in 1986 with Lepper speaking at an economic seminar weekend, organised by Anderton and the Public Service Association economist Peter Harris, to discuss alternative economic policy. From 1989 Lepper was drafting NewLabour Party economic policy with Anderton.

In 1995 Lepper's advice and research informed the Alliance alternative budget which "aimed at lifting employment and reducing inequality of income and wealth". Titled the 'Plan for All New Zealanders' the budget focused on the concept of social justice and included economic policy initiatives such as: abolishing student fees; removing hospital and prescription charges, and introducing rural community health centres; increasing funding for the Treaty of Waitangi fund and the Waitangi Tribunal; raising benefit levels and removing stand downs; increasing foreign aid; increasing funding for public transport, Department of Conservation, the Environmental Protection Authority, renewable energy, pest and weed control; as well as, establishing an economic development fund, including greater funding on essential infrastructure maintenance and new housing projects. These initiatives were fully costed and funded by a variety of tax instruments - drawing on the capacity of those with the greatest resources - which included, progressive taxation, an estate duty and raising corporate tax rates. At the time the NZ Labour Party led by Helen Clark, publicly ridiculed the budget, further entrenching the Labour party's neoliberal turn begun with the Fourth Labour Government, and marking a shift in Labour strategy away from attacking National as its main enemy.

During this time Lepper provided research for the Alliance on the benefits of a financial transaction tax that would raise enough to replace Goods & Services Tax (GST), and therefore move the tax burden away from low income earners to those with greater resources. This was heavily criticised by both Labour and National parties, who joined forces to attack the policy.

In 1999, assisted by Petrus Simons and Tony Simpson, Lepper prepared an alternative budget for the Alliance focusing the greatest spending on healthcare, tertiary education, jobs, superannuation and housing. It also included a capital gains tax and a new financial transaction tax to replace GST. A consumption tax on goods and services, GST was identified by Lepper and the Alliance as impacting "on the poor more severely than other members of society".

From 1999 until 2002, Lepper was seconded as Economic Advisor to the Department of Deputy Prime Minister when Anderton was Deputy Prime Minister of New Zealand in the Fifth Labour Government that formed initially in coalition with the Alliance in 1999. In June 2002, Lepper wrote a memo to Anderton titled 'What has been stopped and achieved' detailing a list of policies the Alliance had prevented Labour from carrying out and of government policies that had been initiated by the Alliance. The list of successfully implemented initiatives included: local government reform; an increase in the conservation vote; a national park on Rakiura Stewart Island; increases in grants for the Environment Court and Waitangi Tribunal; the establishment of the NZ owned Kiwibank; raising minimum youth rates; a public health approach to gambling; and a low fixed-cost option for electricity bills.

In 2003 Lepper returned to Britain via a short period of teaching in China. In 2003 until 2014 he was an Economic Advisor, with the Analytical Services Division of the UK government's Department of Culture, Media & Sport. He was seconded twice to National Lottery Commission first as the Interim Head of Performance and Analysis, and then as a Senior Advisor.

From 2009 to 2011 Lepper was a Research Fellow in the Institute of Advanced Studies at Lancaster University, UK and remained an Honorary Fellow in subsequent years; and from 2013 - 2015 was an Adjunct Professor and Honorary Professorial Research Fellow, at the Alfred Deakin Research Institute, Deakin University, Australia.

Lepper retired to Aotearoa in 2014, where from 2016 - 2021 he was the chair of Silver Line Charitable Trust NZ, a helpline and befriending service that provided information, friendship and advice to older people.

== Commentary and critical analysis ==
From the 1980s to the mid 1990s, Lepper featured in print and broadcast media in Aotearoa providing commentary and critical analysis of developments in the New Zealand economy, government economic policy and global banking movements.

At the time of the 1991 Mother of all Budgets Lepper spoke out against economic austerity. In response to the social welfare cuts by the Fourth National Government, Lepper challenged the government narrative of fiscal savings. He calculated that reducing benefits by the proposed rate would not in real terms make the savings the government was predicting, and more crucially, the cuts would cost the whole of the New Zealand economy to shrink, due to the rise in unemployment and drop in household spending. In an interview on National Radio's Checkpoint, Lepper questioned whether it is sensible for governments to close a fiscal deficit during a depression, and told the NZ Listener, "Cutting the deficit in the middle of a depression is a bloody stupid thing to do. It worsens the depression. It reduces demand in an already weak economy." In Lepper's opinion, devaluation, selective import controls and public works were the economic levers necessary to get the economy back on track.

In 2023 when a study from Inland Revenue revealed the wealthiest families in Aotearoa paid less than half the amount of tax compared to other New Zealanders, Lepper told TVNZ the fact that low income earners in Aotearoa pay tax on all their income is unusual in the world. In order to remedy wealth disparities, Lepper gave the opinion that a capital gains tax on its own "will not be transformative", and that what is needed is a comprehensive wealth tax, a progressive income tax, and a reduction in the dependence Aotearoa has on GST.

== Selected works ==
- Lepper, John, Land and Money: How Britain colonised Australia and New Zealand during the long nineteenth century, (2025) Kerr Publishing: Melbourne. Volume 1: ISBN 978187570354 Volume 2: ISBN 978-1-875703-61-6
- — "Sources of the Treaty of Waitangi", Appendix A, pp. 222–244 and 267-276 in: Ormsby, Maurice, Te Ohaki Tapu: John Stuart Mill & Ngati Maniapoto, (2022) Steele Roberts: Paraparaumu. ISBN 978-1-9911538-0-7
- —An Enquiry into the Ideology and Reality of Market and Market System, (2012) Palgrave Macmillan: Basingstoke. ISBN 978-0-230-32097-0

== Bibliography ==
- Lepper, John, Shabani, M., Toporowski, Jan and Tyson, Judith, 'Monetary adjustment and inflation of financial claims in the UK after 1980' in: Hein, Eckhard, Detzer, Daniel and Dodig, Nina (ed.) Financialisation and the Financial and Economic Crises (2016) Edward Elgar Publishing: Cheltenham. pp. 68–88.
- Lepper, John and Creigh-Tyte, Stephen, 'The National Lottery', in: Leighton Vaughan-Williams, and Donald S. Siegel (eds), The Oxford Handbook of the Economics of Gambling, (2013) Oxford Handbooks, Oxford University Press: Oxford https://doi.org/10.1093/oxfordhb/9780199797912.013.0031
- Lepper, John and Haden, Ben, 'Testing the NLCLiP: Validation of Estimates of Rates of Non-Problematic and Problematic Gambling in a Sample of British Schoolchildren', in: Journal of Gambling Studies, March 2013, Vol 29, Issue 1, pp 15–27.
- Lepper, John, 'Cheating and Information', in: International Gambling Studies, Vol 7, No 2, August 2007, pp. 244–247.
- — 'Competition and Control in UK Gambling Policy' in "Abbott, M. ed., Gambling and problem gambling in New Zealand: Taking stock and moving forward on policy, practice and research: A combined proceedings of the International Gambling Conference and the International Think Tank on Presenting Gambling Populations and First Contact Services", eCommunity: International Journal of Mental Health & Addiction, March 10, 2005.
- Lepper, John and Bunkle, Phillida, 'What Do We Know About Gambling in New Zealand?', in: Social Policy Journal of New Zealand, April 2004.
- Lepper, John, 'The Government Budget', in: Political Quarterly Review, September, 1992.
- — 'Review of "Private Superannuation in the Banking Industry"', pp. 155–159, New Zealand Economic Papers, 1990.
- — 'The International Monetary System: The Quest for Stability', in: Futures, April 1979.
- — 'The Finance of New Zealand Exports and Imports 1968-73', in: New Zealand Economic Papers, 1975.
- — 'Causality in Economics', in: Journal of Post Keynesian Economics, Vol 2, Issue 4, 1971, pp 576–584. Surrey Scholarship Online. Retrieved from http://epubs.surrey.ac.uk/theses/406
