= Alan Low =

New Zealand economist

Sir Alan Roberts Low (11 January 1916 – 18 April 1999) was a New Zealand economist. He was the fifth governor of the Reserve Bank.

== Early life ==
Low was born in Blenheim in 1916, the son of Benjamin Low. His father became headmaster of Timaru Main School and Alan Low attended there before going to Timaru Boys' High School. He then attended the University of Canterbury (1934–1937) and graduated with a Master of Arts (honours) in economics.

Low served in WWII from 1942 to 1944, and belonged to the 24th Field Ambulance of the 2nd New Zealand Expeditionary Force.

== Professional career ==
Low joined the Reserve Bank in 1938. He became assistant economist in 1949, economic adviser in 1951, assistant governor in 1960, and deputy governor (under Gilbert Wilson) in 1962. Low was Governor of the Reserve Bank from 21 July 1967 to 11 February 1977. Low was a member of various New Zealand delegations to international conferences, including Havana (Cuba, 1947/48), Annecy (France, 1949), London (Great Britain, 1951), and Sydney (Australia, 1954). He published various articles in economic journals. He was a director of the National Bank of New Zealand.

== Honours and awards ==
In the 1977 Queen's Silver Jubilee and Birthday Honours, Low was appointed a Knight Bachelor. In the same year, he received an honorary doctorate from the University of Canterbury (LL.D.).

== Family ==
On 19 December 1940, he married Kathleen Harrow, the daughter of E. J. Harrow. They had one son and two daughters. In 1978, the Lows lived in Lower Hutt. His hobbies included music, gardening, and reading. He died on 18 April 1999.

Government offices
Preceded by Gilbert Wilson	Governor of the Reserve Bank of New Zealand; 1967–1977	Succeeded by Raymond W. R. Knight
