= Sue Orr =

Sue Orr may refer to:

- Sue Cook (racewalker) (née Orr; born 1958), Australian former racewalking athlete
- Sue Orr (writer) (born 1962), author from New Zealand
