= Thomas Hanna =

Thomas Hanna may refer to:

- Thomas Hanna (Indiana politician), lieutenant governor of Indiana
- Thomas A. Hanna, member of the New York State Assembly
- Thomas Louis Hanna, American philosophy professor and movement theorist
- Timz (Thomas Hanna), Iraqi-American rapper
- T. P. Hanna (Thomas Patterson Hanna), first chief cashier of the Reserve Bank of New Zealand
