= Margaret Keay =

South African plant pathologist (1911–1998)

Margaret Agnes Keay OBE
- Born: 11 June 1911; Pretoria, South Africa
- Died: 26 October 1998 (aged 87); Cambridge, England
- Education: University of Cape Town; Newnham College, Cambridge
- Scientific career
- Institutions: University of Reading; Makerere University; Ahmadu Bello University; Wye College

Margaret Agnes Keay OBE (11 June 1911 - 26 October 1998), was a South African-born British phytopathologist. She played a role in the development of educational institutions in Africa through activism and financial programmes focusing on education of girls and women in Africa.

== Life and career ==
=== South Africa ===
Keay was born on 11 June 1911 in Pretoria, South Africa, the only child of Scottish parents. Her father was Under-Secretary for Justice in the Union of South Africa. Her early schooling was at the Collegiate School for Girls in Port Elizabeth. She completed a BSc in Botany and a Secondary teachers certificate (with distinction) at Cape Town University.

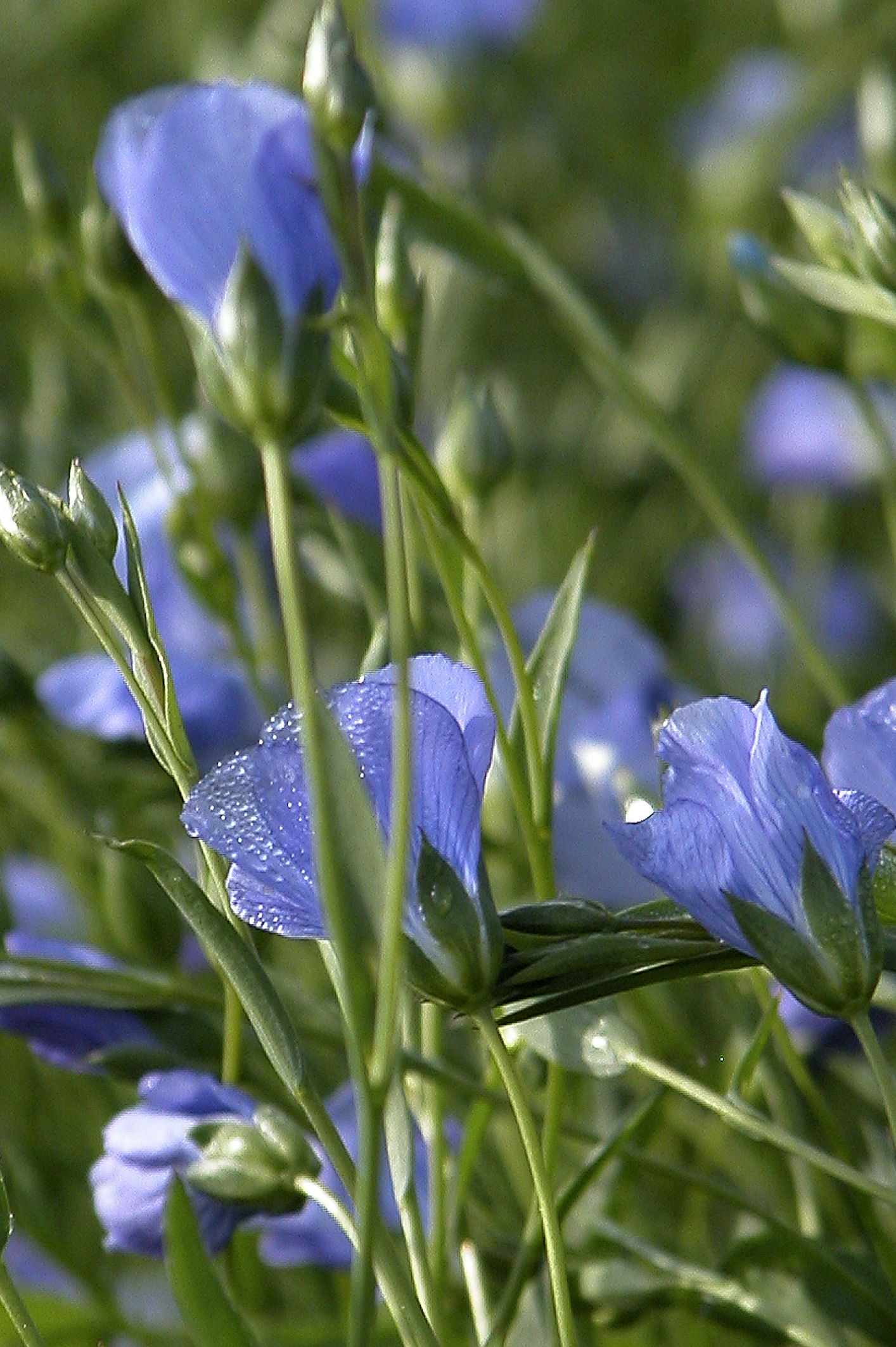
Flax

=== England ===
In 1934 she became a research student in mycology and plant pathology at Newnham College, Cambridge under F.T. Brooks and in 1943 she was appointed a lecturer at the University of Reading, England. She also spent some time in Norfolk, England researching diseases in flax, which was used in parachute harnesses. She returned to Cambridge to the Cambridge University School of Agriculture after the Second World War where she worked with the Commonwealth Potato Collection (now held at the James Hutton Institute and Svalbard Global Seed Vault).

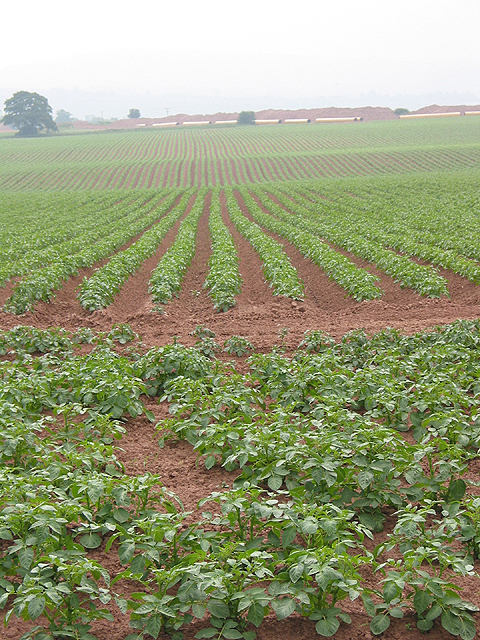
Potato plants

At this time women were only allowed to attend either Girton College or Newnham College at Cambridge. Keay joined a lobby group to have more of the colleges open to women. New Hall and Lucy Cavendish, both female only colleges, were subsequently opened.

=== Uganda ===
In 1954, she went to Uganda, and was appointed as reader in agricultural botany at the Faculty of Agriculture of Makerere College (now Makere University) in Kampala and became head of department in 1960. She was appointed dean of the faculty of agriculture in 1962. During her time in Uganda she assisted in establishing a bursary fund for the secondary education of girls in Uganda. She was also a member of the Uganda Foundation for the Blind.

=== Nigeria ===
In 1964, she moved to Nigeria where she was appointed senior plant pathologist of the Institute for Agricultural Research at Ahmadu Bello University. She lectured in climatology; plant morphology and pathology; and the botany of East African crop plants. From 1968 she was appointed professor and head of department of crop protection.

=== Return to England ===
In 1971, at age 60, Keay retired from Ahmadu Bello University and moved to Wye College becoming dean of women students. The next year she was awarded an OBE. and after retirement in 1976 joined the Department of Applied Biology at Cambridge until its closure in 1989. She died at Cambridge in 1998.
