= Reserve Bank of New Zealand =

Central bank of New Zealand

Reserve Bank of New Zealand Te Pūtea Matua (Māori)
- Central bank of: New Zealand
- Headquarters: Wellington, New Zealand
- Coordinates: 41.278814°S 174.77503°E
- Established: 1 August 1934
- Ownership: State-owned and governed under the 2021 Act
- Governor: Anna Breman
- Currency: New Zealand dollar NZD (ISO 4217)
- Reserves: NZ$42,569 million (July 2026)
- Reserve requirements: None
- Interest on reserves: 2.75% (OCR)
- Website: rbnz.govt.nz

The Reserve Bank of New Zealand (RBNZ) (Māori: Te Pūtea Matua) is the central bank of New Zealand. It sets monetary policy, regulates banks, insurers and other deposit takers, and issues the country's banknotes and coins. It is based in Wellington, and Anna Breman has been governor since December 2025.

The bank was set up in 1934 under the Reserve Bank of New Zealand Act 1933 and has been wholly owned by the government since 1936. It is independent in how it runs monetary policy, is accountable to Parliament, and pays an annual dividend to the government. It is now governed by the Reserve Bank of New Zealand Act 2021.

Since 1990, the bank's main monetary policy aim has been low, stable inflation. New Zealand was the first country to adopt inflation targeting. Since 2019, a Monetary Policy Committee, rather than the governor alone, has set the Official Cash Rate. In 2018 the bank's objectives were widened to include "maximum sustainable employment". This was removed in 2023, leaving price stability as the main goal.

The bank is also responsible for prudential regulation. It supervises banks, insurers and non-bank deposit takers. Banks must hold minimum levels of capital and liquid assets and report regularly to the Reserve Bank. The bank also uses macroprudential policy to limit risky lending across the system, and works with other financial regulators through the Council of Financial Regulators. It cannot guarantee that a bank will not fail, but it has a tool called Open Bank Resolution, which would put the cost of a failure on shareholders and creditors rather than taxpayers. The Deposit Takers Act 2023 introduced a single set of rules for all deposit takers, together with a deposit insurance scheme.

== History ==
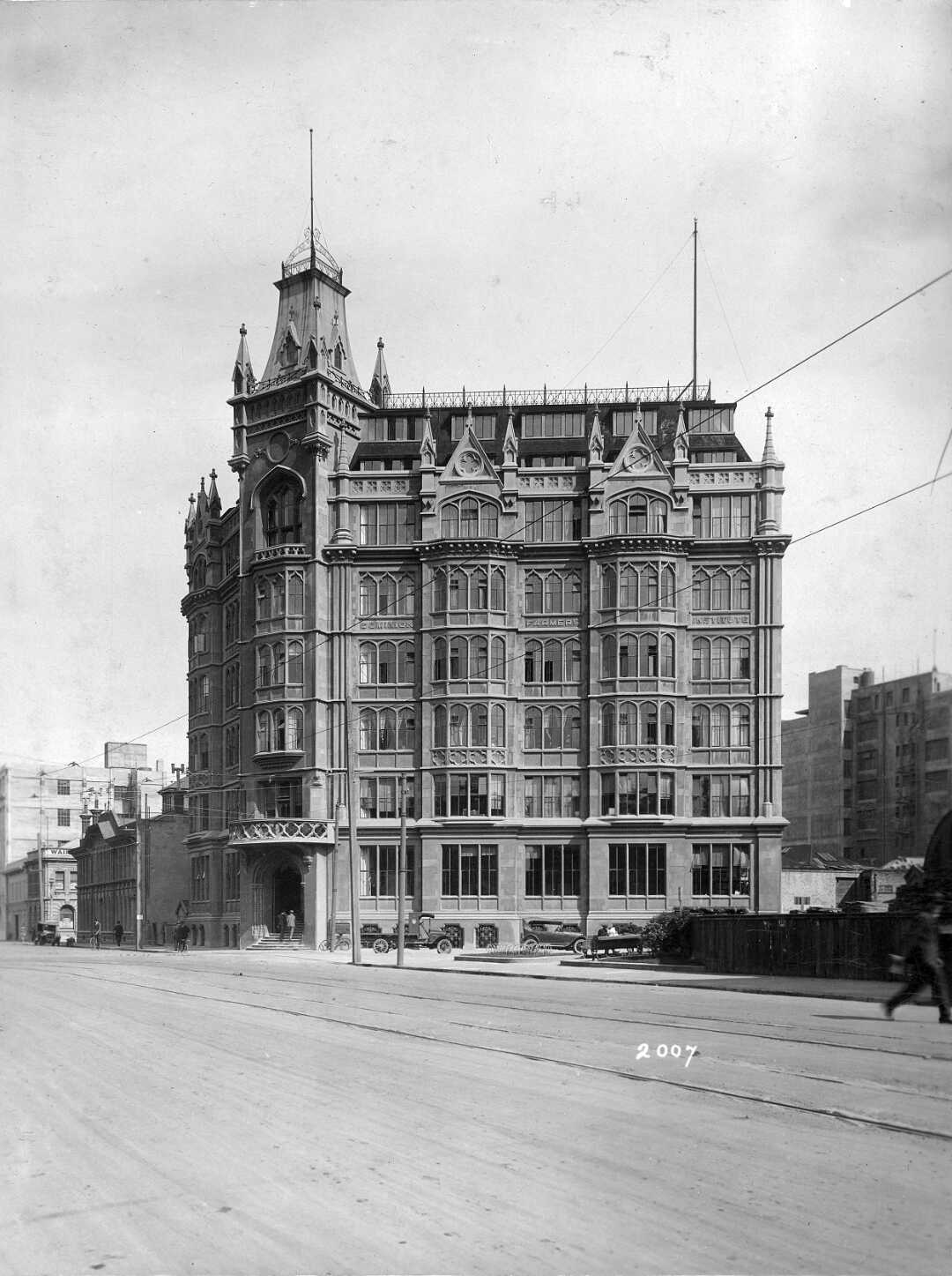
the Dominion Farmers Building was the 1st headquarters of the Reserve Bank of New Zealand.

The Reserve Bank of New Zealand was established from 1 August 1934 by the Reserve Bank of New Zealand Act 1933. The Reserve Bank first issued banknotes in 1934, see New Zealand pound.

The Banking (Prudential Supervision) Act 1989, which came into effect in February 1990, resulted in the Reserve Bank becoming independent of government control in RBNZ's role of managing monetary policy by introducing an inflation targeting mandate. New Zealand was the first country in the world to try this regime, which was later adopted in other countries.

The Reserve Bank of New Zealand Amendment Act 2008 included amendments to the BPSA 1989, including the introduction of capital requirements for deposit takers.

The Non-Bank Deposit Takers Act 2013 gave RBNZ the role of prudential regulator and licensing authority for non-bank deposit takers.

In December 2018, the Sixth Labour Government of New Zealand passed the Reserve Bank of New Zealand (Monetary Policy) Amendment Act 2018, which created the bank's monetary policy committee and codified "maximum sustainable employment" as an objective of monetary policy alongside price stability.

In 2021, the Parliament passed the Reserve Bank of New Zealand Act 2021, which created a new statutory governance board. The RBNZA 2021 also designated the New Zealand Treasury as the bank's external monitor, mandated that the bank publish annual performance expectations and financial risk management statements, and establish a new Foreign Reserves Coordination Framework.

2021 also saw the Financial Market Infrastructures Act 2021 enacted, creating a regulatory regime for financial market infrastructures.

In December 2023, the Sixth National Government of New Zealand passed the Reserve Bank of New Zealand (Economic Objective) Amendment Act 2023 eliminating the "maximum sustainable employment" objective.

In February 2026, the Sixth National Government initiated a review of the Reserve Bank's decisions during the COVID-19 pandemic to lower the Official Cash Rate to 0.25 and inject NZ$55 billion worth of digital money into the New Zealand economy. In September 2026, this independent review led by former Reserve Bank assistant governor David Archer and Massachusetts Institute of Technology professor Athanasios Orphanides found that the Reserve Bank was too slow to raise interest rates during the COVID-19 pandemic in New Zealand, resulting in record high inflation and a lack of price stability. The review also found that the previous Labour Government's dual mandate for the Reserve Bank had resulted in a record low unemployment rate of 3.2 percent.

=== Museum ===
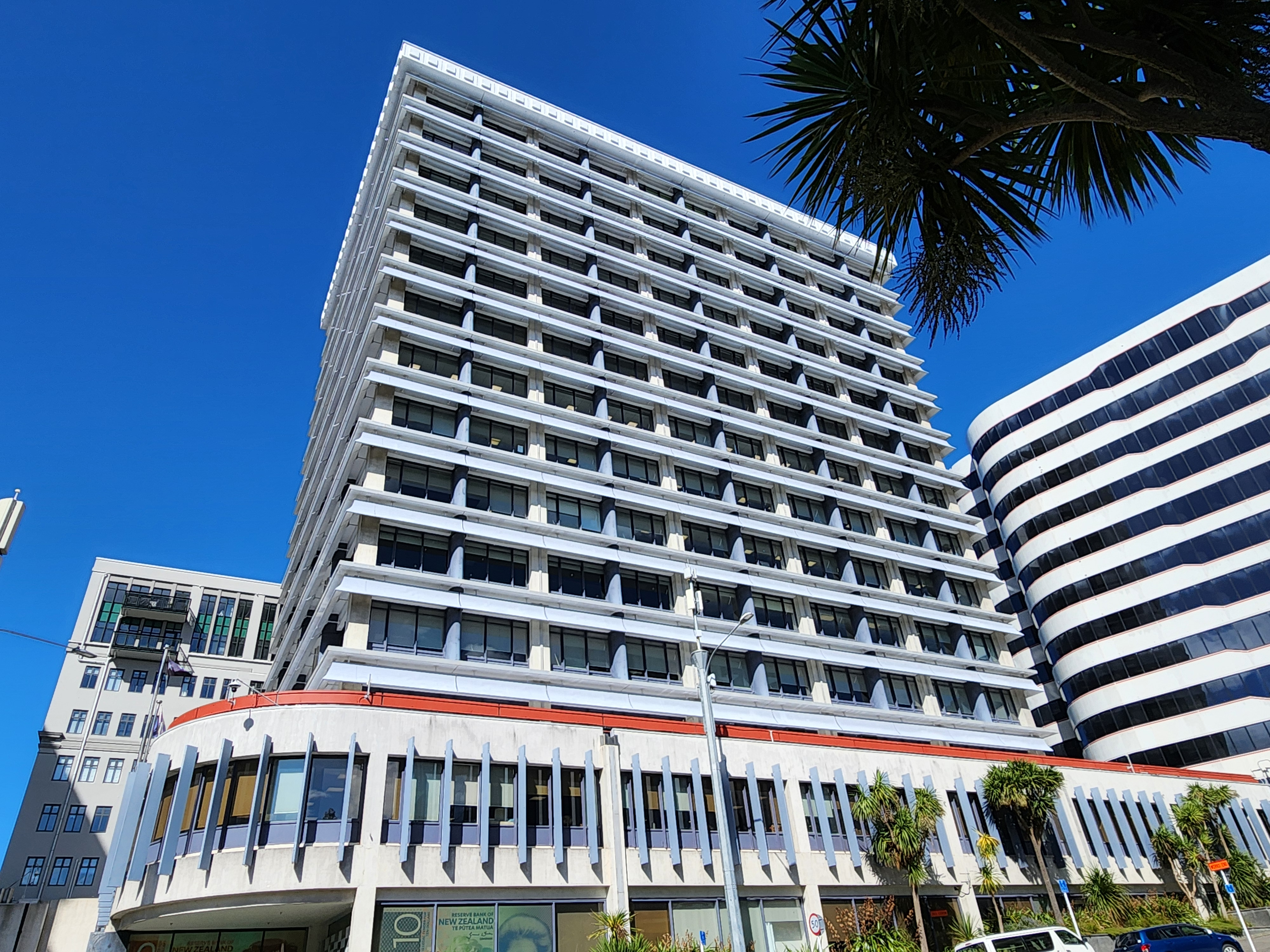
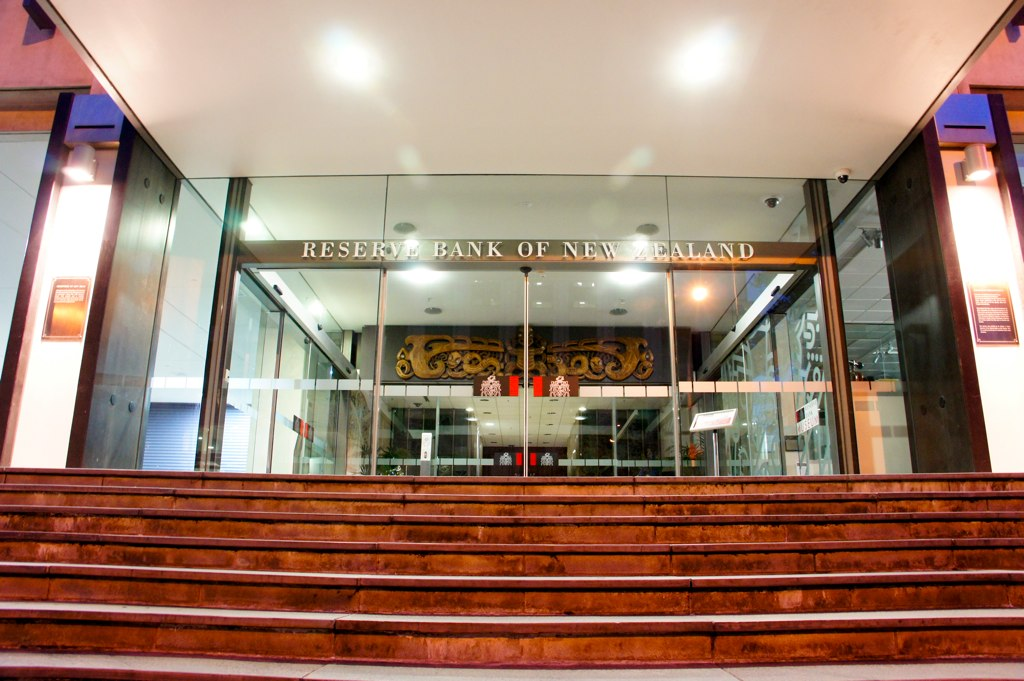
RBNZ headquarters in Wellington

The Reserve Bank Museum, based at the bank's headquarters in Wellington Central, has been open to the public since 2006.

== Ownership ==
The Reserve Bank has been wholly owned by the New Zealand Government since 1936. The Reserve Bank is established by the Reserve Bank of New Zealand Act 2021 and has statutory independence. The Reserve Bank is accountable to Parliament and provides an annual dividend to the Government.

== Monetary policy ==
Since 1990, the Reserve Bank is responsible for the independent management of monetary policy in New Zealand.

=== Monetary policy committee ===
The RBNZ's Monetary policy committee, MPC, consists of internal and external committee members and has a mandate to set the Official Cash Rate and broader monetary stance to deliver low, stable inflation. replaced a single‑governor model in 2019. It has a mandate to maintain price stability through Inflation targeting. The degree of price stability is determined through a Policy Target Agreement with the Minister of Finance.

=== Inflation targeting ===
Inflation targeting was pioneered in New Zealand in 1990. The government and the Reserve Bank of New Zealand adopted a Policy Target Agreement (PTA) in March 1990 in which the Reserve Bank of New Zealand would pursue an inflation target range of 0 to 2 percent.

==== Official Cash Rate ====
The official cash rate (OCR) is the term used in Australia and New Zealand for the bank rate and is the rate of interest which the central bank charges on overnight loans between commercial banks. This allows the Reserve Bank of Australia and the Reserve Bank of New Zealand to adjust the interest rates that apply in each country's economy. The OCR cannot be changed by transactions between financial institutions as this does not change the supply of money, only its location. Only transfers between the central bank and an institution can affect the OCR.

As banks settle all inter-bank transfers overnight, the central bank can regulate the rate paid for cash by the sale or buy back of bonds and other government issued securities (these are known as domestic market operations). As the sale or purchase of bonds affects the supply of money, then the interest rate will change to reflect its availability. This system indirectly influences the term structure of interest rates in the whole economy. Changes to the official cash rate generally affect the rates on housing and other loans within a matter of days or weeks. Under the Australian system the Reserve Bank of Australia issues its dealing intentions at the start of each day, and banks and other financial institutions will act prior to the actual rate being achieved.

The rate is set by the central banks regularly, usually every month in Australia and every six weeks in New Zealand and forms one of the main tools to manage monetary policy.

=== Maximum sustainable employment ===
Between 2019 and 2023 New Zealand moved from a strict price‑stability regime to a dual mandate of price stability and maximum sustainable employment, MSE, implemented via the MPC and flexible inflation targeting. MSE was treated as an unobservable benchmark inferred from a set of labour‑market indicators, with particular attention to cyclical measures such as underutilisation and youth/Māori unemployment.

== Fractional-reserve banking ==
Like all modern monetary systems, the monetary system in New Zealand is based on fiat and fractional-reserve banking. In a fractional-reserve banking system, the largest portion of money created is not created by the Reserve Bank itself. Private sector commercial banks create 80% or more.

== Issuing of currency ==
The bank by virtue of the Reserve Bank Act has the sole right of issuing New Zealand legal tender notes and coins. The Reserve Bank controls the issuing of currency to banks and also replaces used and damaged money from circulation. In March 2005, the bank decided to remove the 5 cent coin from circulation (the following year), as well as reducing the size of 10, 20 and 50 cent coins.

The Reserve Bank accepts all New Zealand currency for payment at face value. This applies to all demonetised or withdrawn currency, however such currency need not be accepted by money changers as it is no longer legal tender. All decimal notes are legal tender except $1 and $2 notes as these have been withdrawn. Damaged notes are still worth something so long as they are recognisable. The Reserve Bank website notes that as a rule of thumb if there is more than half a bank note they will pay its full value. To receive payment people have to turn in the note to either the Reserve Bank in Wellington or any bank.

New Zealand Banknotes are signed by the RBNZ Governor. Between 1940 and 1984 they were signed by the RBNZ Chief Cashier, the first of whom was T. P. Hanna.

=== Central Bank Digital Currency ===
The RBNZ has been evaluating the pros and cons of issuing a central bank digital currency since 2018. In April 2024, the RBNZ held a public consultation on the move toward a digital dollar. This digital currency would coexist with physical cash while offering privacy, security, and trust for users.

=== Collectors coins ===
The Reserve Bank from time to time produces limited runs of legal tender coins for collectors and have a New Zealand theme and design. These coins generally do not circulate, but are legal tender. The coins are sold for the Reserve Bank via New Zealand Post's business unit.

== Prudential regulation ==
The Reserve Bank is responsible for the Prudential regulation of the New Zealand banking system to ensure that the system remains healthy. Banks are regulated under the Banking (Prudential Supervision) Act 1989. As of April 2023 there are 27 registered banks.

=== Capital Adequacy, BS2 ===
New Zealand-incorporated registered banks are required to maintain a minimum level of capital relative to their risk-weighted assets, measured by their Capital adequacy ratio. This helps ensure that banks have enough money to cover any losses they might incur.

=== Liquidity, BS13 ===
policy mandating the minimum amount that a commercial bank must hold in liquid assets. The liquidity policy of New Zealand's locally incorporated registered banks is primarily governed by two banking prudential requirements documents: 'Liquidity policy' (BS13) and 'Liquidity policy annex – liquid assets' (BS13A). These documents are part of the banks' conditions of registration. Additionally, reporting requirements are imposed under section 93 of the Banking (Prudential Supervision) Act 1989.

=== Disclosure, BS7 ===
All registered banks operating in New Zealand must issue a quarterly disclosure statement, which the Reserve Bank scrutinise. The purpose of these disclosure statements is to assist depositors to make sound decision and encourage banks to maintain sound banking practices

The disclosure comprises:

- A key information summary that provides a brief overview of the bank's financial condition
- General disclosure statement to provide comprehensive information on the bank
- Supplemental disclosure statement

=== Credit Ratings ===
Under section 80 of the BPSA 1989, the RBNZ requires that all registered banks must have a valid credit rating for their long-term, senior, unsecured obligations in New Zealand dollars. These ratings, provided by independent agencies, assess a bank's financial stability and likelihood of repaying its debts. The RBNZ maintains a register of these ratings for each registered bank, which are also disclosed in the banks' semi-annual statements.

=== Outsourcing, BS11 ===
The RBNZ outsourcing policy, Banking Standard 11, applies to large New Zealand-incorporated registered banks. Outsourcing occurs when a bank uses another party to perform business functions that would traditionally have been undertaken by the bank itself. Common examples include IT processing, accounting, and call centers. The outsourcing policy aims to ensure that large banks have the legal and practical ability to control and execute outsourced functions. It ensures that outsourcing arrangements do not compromise a bank's ability to be effectively administered under statutory management and operate for the purposes of continuing to provide and circulate liquidity to the financial system and the wider economy. The bank must be able to facilitate basic banking services by any new owner of all or part of the bank. They must also address the impact of service or function provider failures on the bank's ability to carry on its business. Large banks must achieve specific outcomes, including:

- Meeting daily clearing, settlement, and other time-critical obligations.
- Monitoring and managing financial positions (credit, liquidity, and market risk).
- Providing basic banking services to existing customers, including liquidity and account activity reporting.

=== Connected Exposures, BS8 ===
NZ registered banks are required to report their large exposures to RBNZ. This includes not only the large exposures but also the 20 largest exposures, even if they do not meet the large exposure threshold.

Connected exposures occur when multiple counterparties are linked through control relationships or economic interdependence. For example, if one company controls another, or if the financial health of one entity directly affects another, they are considered connected.

The Basel Committee on Banking Supervision (BCBS) has set guidelines to limit large exposures. A large exposure is defined as any exposure that is 10% or more of a bank's Tier 1 capital. For global systemically important banks (G-SIBs), the limit is stricter, capping exposures to other G-SIBs at 15% of Tier 1 capital.

These regulations aim to prevent banks from incurring significant losses due to the default of a single counterparty or a group of connected counterparties. This helps in maintaining the stability of the financial system by reducing the risk of cascading failures.

=== Open Bank Resolution, BS17 ===
'Open Bank Resolution (OBR)' is a tool for dealing with a bank failure. OBR allows authorities to reopen a failed bank the next day under statutory control. It seeks to prevent abrupt disruptions to the bank's essential functions. while a long-term solution to the bank's failure is found, customers can promptly access their accounts to make and receive payments. OBR places the cost of a bank failure on the bank's shareholders and creditors, rather than taxpayers. Shareholders lose their investment first, followed by creditors if necessary. Creditor claims may be frozen to absorb losses, and they may suffer financial loss if the bank is unable to satisfy its obligations. In the absence of OBR, the only ways to deal with a bank failure are liquidation, government bailout, or acquisition by a competitor. OBR covers banks with local incorporation that have more than $1 billion in retail deposits. The OBR programme is voluntary for other registered banks to participate in.

=== Macroprudential regulation ===
The goal of Macroprudential regulation is to reduce the likelihood of a financial crisis by limiting excessive lending during upturns and making banks and households more resilient during downturns. It focuses on risks to the financial system as a whole.

A Memorandum of Understanding between the Minister of Finance and the RBNZ Governor defines macroprudential policy and has guidelines for how we use the policy.

=== Trans-Tasman Council on Banking Supervision ===
The RBNZ is a member of the council, which promotes the coordination and harmonisation of trans-Tasman bank regulation, where appropriate. Its mandate also covers potential issues relating to financial stability, efficiency, and integration throughout the wider financial sector.

=== Council of Financial Regulators (CoFR) – Kaunihera Kaiwhakarite Ahumoni ===
The Council of Financial Regulators (CoFR) is an inter‑agency coordination forum for New Zealand's financial system regulators. Its purpose is to promote effective and coherent regulation of the financial system by facilitating information‑sharing, coordination of regulatory initiatives, and discussion of system‑wide risks that cut across individual regulatory mandates.

CoFR comprises senior representatives from RBNZ and the following agencies:

- Financial Markets Authority
- New Zealand Treasury
- Ministry of Business, Innovation and Employment
- Commerce Commission (New Zealand)

The Council is jointly co‑chaired by the Reserve Bank of New Zealand and the Financial Markets Authority.

=== Basel Committee on Banking Supervision ===
The Reserve Bank largely follows the 2010 Basel III standards in implementing its bank capital requirements.

=== Deposit Takers Act ===
In June 2023 the Deposit Takers Act replaced the RBNZ Act 1989 and the NBDTA 2013 as the foundational law regulating Deposit Takers (New Zealand banks, building societies and credit unions).

It creates a single regulatory regime for all deposit takers and a deposit insurance scheme.

==== Depositor Compensation Scheme ====
The Deposit Takers Act 2023 created the Depositor Compensation Scheme, a form of deposit insurance for banks and non-bank deposit takers. If the Reserve Bank issues a "specified event notice" for a deposit taker, which triggers a payout, eligible depositors are compensated up to NZ$100,000 per depositor, per deposit taker. The Reserve Bank runs the scheme, and deposit takers fund it through levies. Protection began on 1 July 2025, ahead of the rest of the Act, which is due to take full effect on 1 December 2028.

=== Insurance industry prudential supervision ===
Under section 12 of the Insurance (Prudential Supervision) Act 2010, the RBNZ is charged with the prudential supervision of the New Zealand insurance industry. This includes the licensing of persons to carry on insurance business in New Zealand.

=== Regulation of non-bank deposit takers (NBDTs) ===
Under Part 5D of the RBNZ Act 1989, the RBNZ was charged with the enforcement of the credit rating and prudential requirements applying to non-bank deposit takers (NBDTs) in New Zealand. These functions were introduced by the enactment of the Reserve Bank of New Zealand Amendment Act 2008.

Under the NBDT 2013 the RBNZ acts as the prudential regulator and licensing authority for NBDTs.

== Governors ==
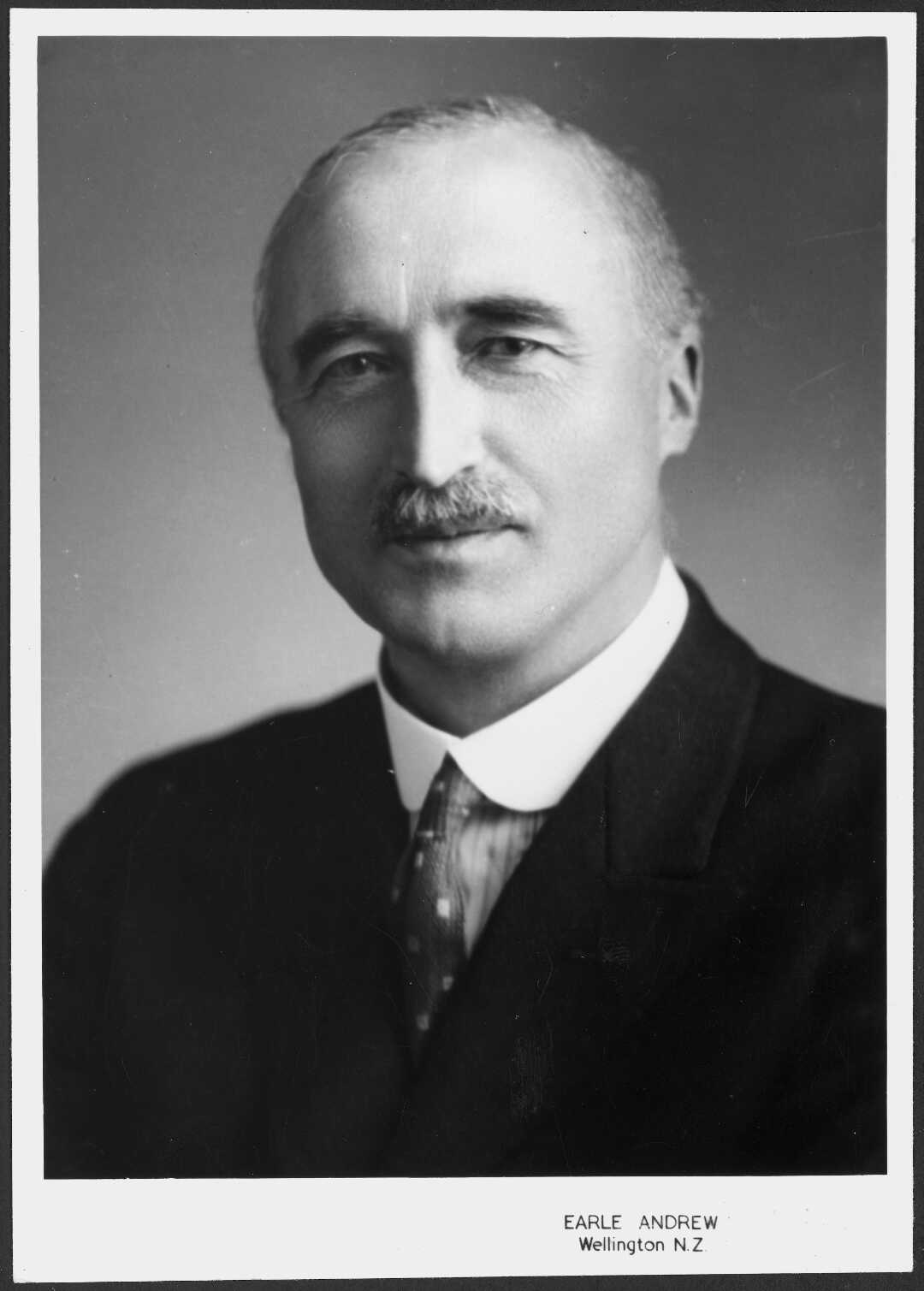
Portrait of Leslie Lefeaux (1886–1962) – the 1st Governor of the Reserve Bank of New Zealand

The Governor is accountable for the Bank's performance in maintaining price stability, promoting a sound and efficient financial system, and meeting the currency needs of the public but retains statutory independence as to how these key outcomes are achieved.

The following have served as governors of the Reserve Bank:

- Leslie Lefeaux (1 January 1934 – 31 December 1940)
- William Fox Longley Ward (Acting Governor: 1 May 1941 – 1 February 1944), (1 February 1944 – 8 July 1948)
- Edward Coldham Fussell (21 July 1948 – 20 July 1962)
- Gilbert Wilson (21 July 1962 – 20 July 1967)
- Sir Alan Low (21 July 1967 – 31 August 1973)
- Sir Henry Lang (1 September 1973 – 11 February 1977 )
- Raymond W. R. White (12 February 1977 – 11 February 1982)
- Dick L. Wilks (12 February 1982 – 17 May 1984)
- Sir Spencer Russell (18 May 1984 – 31 August 1988)
- Dr Don Brash (1 September 1988 – 26 April 2002)
- Dr Alan Bollard (23 September 2002 – 25 September 2012)
- Graeme Wheeler (26 September 2012 – 27 September 2017)
- Grant Spencer (Acting Governor: October 2017 – March 2018)
- Adrian Orr (27 March 2018 – 5 March 2025)
- Christian Hawkesby, (Acting Governor: 6 March 2025 – 1 December 2025)
- Dr Anna Breman (1 December 2025 – Present)

== Banknote signatories ==
All current New Zealand banknotes are signed by the governor of the RBNZ, however between 1940 and 1984 banknotes were signed by the chief cashier. Signatories since 1934 are as follows:

- 1934–1940: Leslie Lefeaux, Governor
- 1940–1953: T. P. Hanna, Chief Cashier
- 1953–1956: Gilbert Wilson, Chief Cashier
- 1956–1967: Neal Fleming, Chief Cashier
- 1967–1973: Dick L Wilks, Chief Cashier
- 1973–1977: Lindsay Knight, Chief Cashier
- 1977–1984: Ray Hardie, Chief Cashier
- 1984–1988: Sir Spencer T Russell, Governor
- 1988–2002: Dr Donald T Brash, Governor
- 2002–2012: Dr Alan E Bollard, Governor
- 2012–2017: Graeme Wheeler, Governor
- 2017–2018: Grant Spencer, Acting Governor
- 2018–2025: Adrian Orr, Governor
- 2025: Dr Anna Breman, Governor

== Coat of arms ==
Coat of arms of the Reserve Bank of New Zealand
Notes The Arms of the Reserve Bank of New Zealand was granted on 1 June 1965 Crest A wreath of the colours Out of a Mural Crown Sable charged with three Bezants a demi Griffin Or holding between the paws a Portcullis Sable Escutcheon Gules two Keys in saltire wards downwards and outward, Argent in chief a representation of the Head of King Tāwhiao couped proper and in base an ancient Ship sail furled pennon and flags flying oars in action and in fess a Bull's Head couped and a Fleece Or Supporters On either side a Lion Sable each gorged with a collar of Bezants pendant therefrom a Key wards downwards and inwards Or Motto Securitas et Vigilantia (Latin: security and vigilance)

== See also ==
- New Zealand dollar
- Banks in New Zealand
- Financial Markets Authority (New Zealand) (FMA) – Financial regulator in New Zealand
- List of central banks
- List of financial supervisory authorities by country
- List of International Financial Reporting Standards
- Australian Prudential Regulation Authority (APRA) – Regulatory body for the Australian financial sector
