= Ted Bollard =

New Zealand botanist, plant physiologist and science administrator (1920–2011)

Ted Bollard CBE
- Born: Edward George Bollard; 21 January 1920; Athlone, Ireland
- Died: 10 November 2011 (aged 91); Auckland, New Zealand
- Education: Emmanuel College, Cambridge
- Children: Alan Bollard
- Scientific career
- Fields: Botany, science administration
- Workplaces: Department of Scientific and Industrial Research
- Thesis: (1948)
- Academic advisors: F. T. Brooks

Edward George Bollard CBE (21 January 1920 – 10 November 2011) was a New Zealand plant physiologist and science administrator.

== Biography ==
Born in Athlone, Ireland in 1920, Bollard moved to New Zealand as a child with his family. His family settled in Glen Eden, and he became dux at Mt Albert Grammar School. After this, he attended Auckland University College (now the University of Auckland). He joined Plant Diseases Division of the Department of Scientific and Industrial Research (DSIR), but all territorial units were called up after the bombing of Pearl Harbor and he left with the 9th Reinforcements of the 2nd New Zealand Expeditionary Force. He was involved in the invasion of Italy. Despite being a Pākehā, he was assigned to the Māori Battalion as a signaller.

At the end of the war he received a bursary to attend Emmanuel College, Cambridge and do a PhD under F. T. Brooks.

Returning to New Zealand he rejoined the DSIR and rose to direct its plant diseases division. He was elected a Fellow of the Royal Society of New Zealand in 1964, and was award the Hector Medal in 1972. In 1977, he was awarded the Queen Elizabeth II Silver Jubilee Medal, and in the 1983 New Year Honours, he was appointed a Commander of the Order of the British Empire, for services to science.

Bollard died in Auckland in 2011 and his ashes were interred at Purewa Cemetery in 2013.
