= Graeme Wheeler =

New Zealand politician (born 1951)

Graeme Wheeler CNZM
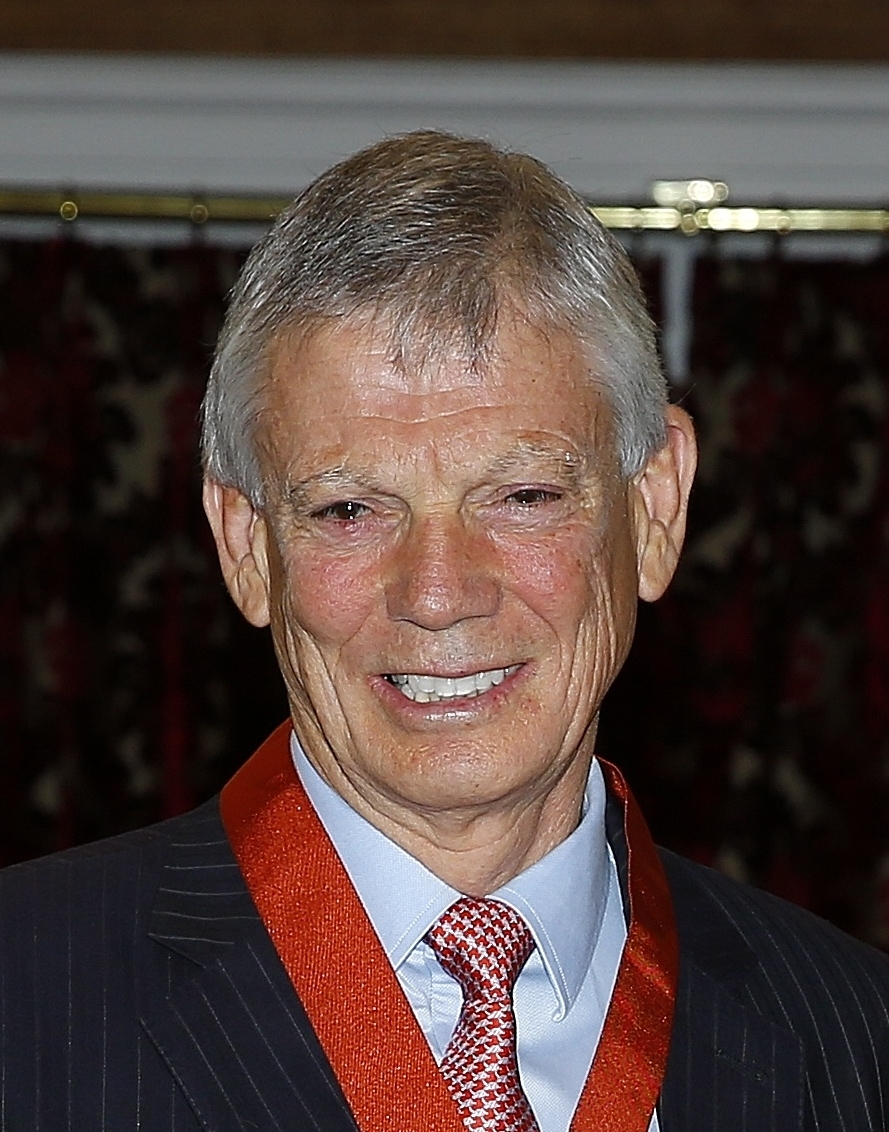
- Wheeler in 2018

11th Governor of the Reserve Bank of New Zealand
- In office 26 September 2012 – 27 September 2017
- Preceded by: Alan Bollard
- Succeeded by: Adrian Orr

Vice President and Treasurer of World Bank Group
- In office 2001–2006

Managing Director Operations of World Bank Group
- In office 2006–2010

Deputy Secretary of New Zealand Treasury
- In office 1993–1997

Director of Macroeconomic Policy of New Zealand Treasury
- In office 1990–1993

Personal details
- Born: 30 October 1951 (age 74)

Graeme Paul Wheeler CNZM (born 30 October 1951) is a former governor of the Reserve Bank of New Zealand from 2012 to September 2017. He succeeded Alan Bollard in this role on 26 September 2012 and was succeeded by Grant Spencer.

== Professional career ==
Educated at the University of Auckland, Wheeler began working at the New Zealand Treasury in 1973 as an adviser. From 1984 to 1990, he was economic and financial councillor for the New Zealand delegation to the Organisation for Economic Co-operation and Development, eventually becoming director of macroeconomic policy at the New Zealand Treasury in 1990. In 1997, he went to work for the World Bank Group, firstly as director of the Financial Products and Services Department. From 2001 to 2006, he was treasurer and vice-president of the World Bank. From 2006 to 2010 he was managing director of operations at the World Bank overseeing 12,000 staff and a US$1.7 billion budget. In 2010, Wheeler left the World Bank to start his own firm, advising investors and Russian policy makers about Russian privatisation. Wheeler currently serves as a company director in Europe, Africa and China.

== Reserve Bank governor ==
Wheeler succeeded Alan Bollard as governor of the Reserve Bank of New Zealand on 26 September 2012. Wheeler was replaced by deputy governor Grant Spencer on 27 September 2017. In the 2018 New Year Honours, Wheeler was appointed Companion of the New Zealand Order of Merit for services to the state.

== Cricketing career ==
A right-hand batsman and right-arm medium-pace bowler, Wheeler played one first-class match for Wellington in the 1981–82 season and two List A games where he topped the New Zealand bowling averages.

== See also ==
- Everything bubble
- Greenspan put

Government offices
Preceded by Alan Bollard	Governor of the Reserve Bank of New Zealand; 2012–17	Succeeded by Grant Spencer
