= Leslie Lefeaux =

First governor of Reserve Bank of New Zealand

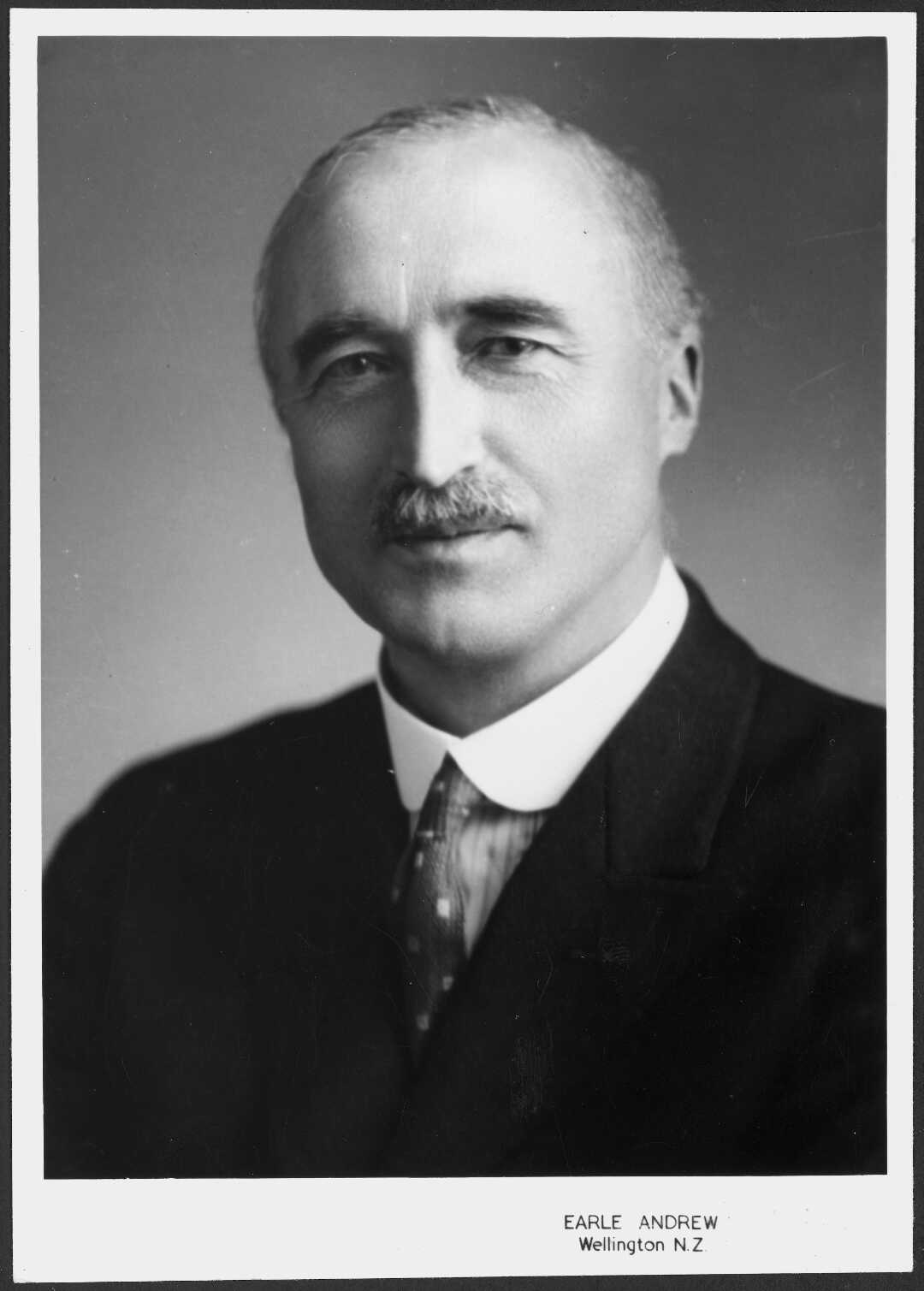
- Portrait of Leslie Lefeaux
- Occupation: Banker
- Known for: First governor of the Reserve Bank of New Zealand

Leslie Lefeaux was the first governor of the Reserve Bank of New Zealand.

== Career ==
Lefeaux was the assistant to the governor at the Bank of England before he arrived in New Zealand in 1934 to take up the role of Governor at the Reserve Bank of New Zealand.

The Reserve Bank opened on 1 August 1934. "We were launched last Wednesday," Lefeaux wrote to British Banker Otto Niemeyer. "But no flags; no trumpets, and no breaking of champagne bottles on the bow. We merely glided gently and noiselessly down the slipway. I felt in the circumstances that that was the best course."

His signature appears on the first issue of New Zealand's bank notes.

In 1946 he returned to England.

== Roles ==
- Joined the Bank of England in 1904
- Appointed Deputy Chief Cashier in 1927
- Assistant to the Governor of the Bank of England
- Governor, Reserve Bank of New Zealand, 1934–40
