= Gilbert Wilson (banker) =

New Zealand banker (died 1994)

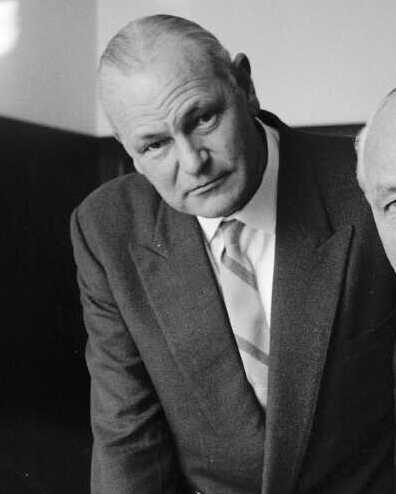
- Wilson, c. 1953
- Died: 29 March 1994
- Occupation: Banker
- Known for: Governor of the RBNZ

Gilbert Wilson (died 29 March 1994) was a New Zealand banker. He was the governor of the Reserve Bank of New Zealand.

== Career ==
In 1953, Wilson was appointed the chief cashier of the Reserve Bank of New Zealand after T. P. Hanna (the previous chief cashier) was promoted to the board of directors. As with the Chief Cashier of the Bank of England, between 1940 and 1984, New Zealands banknotes were signed by the chief cashier. Therefore bank notes issued between 1953 and 1956 bear Wilson's signature.

Wilson held the chief cashier role until 1956 where he was promoted to deputy governor of the Reserve Bank of New Zealand. He was promoted to governor in 1962, a position he held until his retirement in 1967.

== Roles ==
- Joined the Reserve Bank of New Zealand in 1935
- Chief cashier, Reserve Bank of New Zealand, 1953–56
- Deputy Governor, Reserve Bank of New Zealand, appointed 1956
- Governor, Reserve Bank of New Zealand, 1962–1967
