= Adrian Orr =

New Zealand economist

12th Governor of the Reserve Bank of New Zealand
- In office 27 March 2018 – 5 March 2025
- Preceded by: Graeme Wheeler
- Succeeded by: Anna Breman

Personal details
- Born: 1962 or 1963 (age 63–64) Taupō, New Zealand
- Spouse: Sue Orr
- Children: 3
- Education: University of Waikato; University of Leicester

Adrian Orr is a New Zealand economist and former governor of the Reserve Bank of New Zealand. He resigned in March 2025, three years before his contract was due to terminate.

== Early life ==
Orr has Cook Island heritage through his grandfather No'oroa George, who moved to New Zealand in the 1930s. His father was of Irish descent and died when Orr was 13.

Orr was born and raised in Taupō. At the time his father died, he had almost finished building a motel in Taupō. The family received help from his father's workmates to complete the building. The family then ran the motel during Orr's secondary schooling. As a young man, Orr worked in a range of jobs, including as a plumber, sewerage pipe layer, short-order cook, dishwasher, and driving machinery for a local Taupō firm.

He has a Bachelor of Social Science (Economics and Geography) from the University of Waikato, and a Master's Degree in Development Economics (with Distinction) from the University of Leicester.

== Career ==
From 1997 to 2000, he was chief manager of the Economics Department of the Reserve Bank of New Zealand.

He has worked as an economist at the OECD and the New Zealand Treasury, and was Chief Economist for the New Zealand National Bank and Westpac Bank (2000–2003).

From 2003 to 2007, he was Deputy Governor and Head of Financial Stability at the Reserve Bank.

=== NZ Super Fund ===
In 2007, he was appointed Chief Executive of the New Zealand Superannuation Fund (the NZ Super Fund). Orr said he enjoyed the job's "beautiful mix [of] big, long-term, intergenerational challenges — and its hard-edge economics and finance."

In 2017, while Chief Executive of the New Zealand Superannuation Fund, his salary (almost NZ$1,000,000 ($1,335,661 in 2026)) and his annual pay saw an increase of 36%, which caused controversy. Prime Minister Bill English and the State Services Commission objected to the increase, and English said the NZ Super Fund Board members who had approved the increase could lose their positions as a result. The board members' position was that Orr's salary was in line with the market.

=== Governor of the Reserve Bank ===
Orr was appointed by Finance Minister Grant Robertson to be Governor in December 2017 (succeeding Graeme Wheeler, then acting Governor Grant Spencer). He started in the role in March 2018.

Robertson noted at the time of his appointment that the Sixth Labour Government was reviewing the Reserve Bank Act, and Orr would be well placed to steer the Bank through the review. Before his appointment the Government had signalled its intention to add maximising employment to the Reserve Banks's objectives in addition to its inflation target.

On 8 November 2022, the Government extended Orr's position as Reserve Bank Governor for another five years at the recommendation of the Reserve Bank Board. While Robertson supported Orr's reappointment on the grounds of continuity and stability, the opposition National Party finance spokesperson Nicola Willis called for an independent review of the Reserve Bank's performance. National Party leader Christopher Luxon also questioned the Government's decision to extend Orr's term for another five years prior to the 2023 New Zealand general election. ACT Party leader David Seymour opposed Orr's reappointment on the grounds of what he described as his "poor leadership, poor focus and poor outcomes".

On 5 March 2025, Orr abruptly resigned as Reserve Bank Governor. According to Finance Minister Willis, discussions between Orr and the Reserve Bank Board had occurred prior to Orr's resignation. Deputy Governor Christian Hawkesby was appointed as acting Governor until 31 March, when Willis will appoint a temporary governor for six months as the Reserve Bank seeks a permanent successor. Seymour expressed hope that Orr's successor would address the country's cost of living crisis while Labour Party leader Chris Hipkins thanked Orr for his leadership during the COVID-19 pandemic in New Zealand.

On 11 June 2025, several media outlets, including Radio New Zealand and The New Zealand Herald, reported that Orr had resigned in early March 2025 following a disagreement with Willis and the Reserve Bank about the National-led coalition government's decision to reduce funding to the bank over the next five years. While the Reserve Bank's board, led by Neil Quigley, had accepted the reduced funding, Orr disagreed and subsequently stepped down as Reserve Bank Governor. The following day, Willis criticised the Reserve Bank for not disclosing this information earlier but waiting until the media had submitted an Official Information Act request.

On 10 September 2025, texts released under OIA revealed that Willis was warned she might be asked by the Reserve Bank's board to sack Adrian Orr as Reserve Bank Governor.

== Personal life ==
Orr is married to novelist Sue Orr and has three children.
