= Brooksia (fungus) =

Scientific classification
- Kingdom: Fungi
- Division: Ascomycota
- Class: Dothideomycetes
- Family: incertae sedis
- Genus: Brooksia (fungus); Hansf.

Type species
- Brooksia tropicalis Hansf.

Genus of fungi

Brooksia is a genus of fungi in the class Dothideomycetes. The relationship of this taxon to other taxa within the class is unknown (incertae sedis).

The genus name of Brooksia is in honour of Frederick Tom Brooks (1882 – 1952), an English botanist and Professor of Botany at the University of Cambridge.

The genus was circumscribed by Clifford Gerald Hansford in Proc. Linn. Soc. New South Wales Vol.81 on page 32 in 1956.

== See also ==
- List of Dothideomycetes taxa incertae sedis
