= Neal Fleming =

New Zealand banker (died 1975)

- Died: 22 August 1975
- Occupation: Banker
- Known for: First signatory of the New Zealand Dollar Notes

Neal Fleming was best known for being the signatory on the first New Zealand Dollar notes.

== Career ==
When he joined in 1934, Fleming became one of the first employees of the Reserve Bank of New Zealand.

In 1953, he was appointed the third chief cashier of the Reserve Bank of New Zealand. He remained chief cashier for 11 years. As with the Chief Cashier of the Bank of England, between 1940 and 1984, New Zealands banknotes were signed by the chief cashier. Therefore bank notes issued between 1956 and 1967 bear Fleming's signature.

Fleming was a member of the Decimal Currency Board - a team responsible for replacing the New Zealand Pound with the decimal New Zealand Dollar.

Decimalisation of the New Zealand currency occurred on 10 July 1967, when the New Zealand pound was replaced by the New Zealand dollar. On the same day, new decimal banknotes were introduced to replace the existing pound banknotes, in denominations of $1, $2, $5, $10, $20, and $100.

Fleming's signature is on the first New Zealand Dollar notes ever produced.

== Roles ==
- Joined the Reserve Bank of New Zealand in 1934
- Chief cashier, Reserve Bank of New Zealand, 1956–67
- Member of the Decimal Currency Board, Reserve Bank of New Zealand, mid 1960s
