= Frederick Tom Brooks =

English botanist (1882–1952)

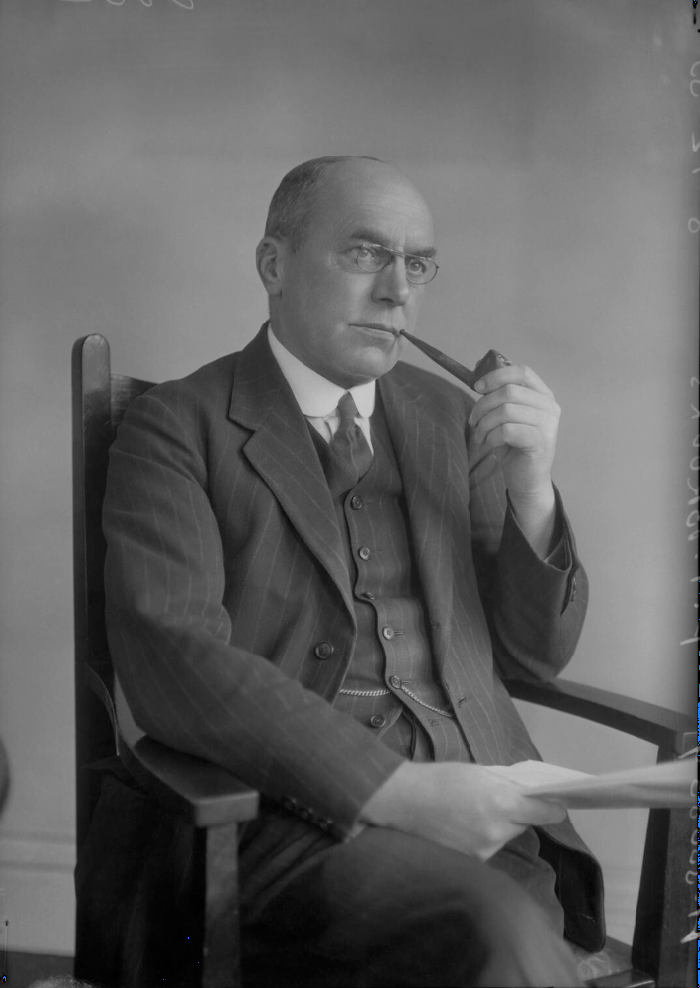
- Frederick Tom Brooks, 1933
- Born: 17 December 1882; Somerset, England
- Died: 11 March 1952 (aged 69); Cambridge, England
- Awards: FRS (1930)
- Scientific career
- Fields: botany, mycology, plant diseases
- Institutions: Emmanuel College, Cambridge
- Notable students: Ted Bollard; Margaret Keay

Frederick Tom Brooks CBE FRS (17 December 1882 – 11 March 1952) was an English botanist and Professor of Botany at the University of Cambridge.

== Life ==
Brooks was born in Wells, Somerset the son of Edward Brooks and attended Sexey's School, Somerset from 1895 to 1898. He then attended Merrywood Teacher Training College in Bristol.

He went up to Emmanuel College, Cambridge in 1902.

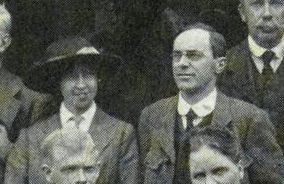
Emily and Frederick Brooks at a British Mycological Society meeting in 1913

In 1907, he married Emily Broderick. They had no children.

From 1905 to 1917, he held the role of demonstrator in the botany department. During the First World War, he had the role of plant pathologist in the Department of Food Production. From 1919 to 1931, he was a lecturer at Cambridge and from 1931 to 1936 a reader.

He became Professor of Botany at Cambridge in 1936. He specialised in mycology and investigated, amongst other things, silver-leaf disease of fruit trees. He was elected a Fellow of the Royal Society in 1930 and an Honorary Fellow of the Royal Society of Edinburgh in 1946. He was president of the Cambridge Philosophical Society from 1945 to 1947.

He died in Cambridge aged 70.

In 1956, Clifford Gerald Hansford circumscribed the genus Brooksia, a genus of fungi in the class Dothideomycetes and named in Frederick Tom Brooks honour.

== Publications ==
- Plant Diseases (1928)
