= Goods and Services Tax Act 1985 =

Act of Parliament in New Zealand

Goods and Services Tax Act

New Zealand Parliament
- Status: Current legislation

The Goods and Services Tax Act is an Act of Parliament passed in New Zealand in 1985.

The Act established a consumption tax in New Zealand, originally set at 10%, but subsequently raised to 15%. GST is a tax of 15% on all goods, services and other items sold or consumed in New Zealand. Individuals become liable to pay GST when their annual turnover exceeds NZ$60,000 in any 12-month period.
