= Alan Bollard =

New Zealand economist

Alan Bollard CNZM FRSNZ
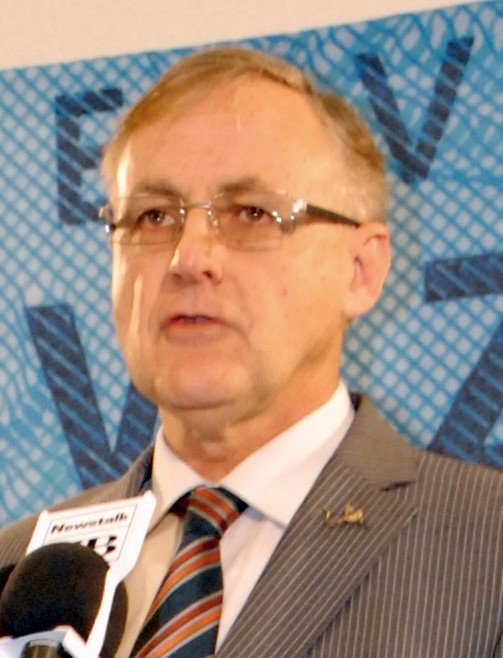
- Alan Bollard at the 5 June 2008 Monetary Policy Statement in Wellington

Executive Director of the Asia-Pacific Economic Cooperation
- In office 1 January 2013 – 31 December 2019
- Preceded by: Muhammad Noor
- Succeeded by: Rebecca Fatima Sta Maria

10th Governor of the Reserve Bank of New Zealand
- In office 23 September 2002 – 25 September 2012
- Preceded by: Donald Brash
- Succeeded by: Graeme Wheeler

Secretary to the Treasury of New Zealand
- In office February 1998 – April 2002
- Preceded by: Murray Horn
- Succeeded by: John Whitehead

Chair of the Commerce Commission
- In office 1994–1998
- Succeeded by: John Belgrave

Personal details
- Born: 1951 (age 74–75) Auckland, New Zealand
- Spouse: Jenny Morel
- Relations: Ted Bollard (father)
- Education: PhD, LLD; University of Auckland

Alan Esmond Bollard CNZM FRSNZ (born 5 June 1951) is a New Zealand economist and retired senior public servant. He was Secretary to the Treasury from 1998 to 2002, Governor of the Reserve Bank from 2002 to 2012, and executive director of the Asia Pacific Economic Cooperation (APEC) secretariat from 2013 to 2018.

== Early life and family ==
Bollard was born in Auckland on 5 June 1951. His parents were Constance Mary (née Esmond) and Ted Bollard. He attended Owairaka Primary School, Wesley Intermediate School, and Mount Albert Grammar School. Intending to study history, he gained a PhD in economics from the University of Auckland in 1977, and was awarded an honorary Doctor of Laws (LLD) by the same university in 2007.

He is married to venture capitalist Jenny Morel. They married in 1977 and have two sons.

== Career ==
After finishing his PhD, Bollard worked overseas in New Caledonia and Europe. Returning to New Zealand in 1984, he was employed by the New Zealand Institute of Economic Research as an industrial economist. In 1987, he became the institute's director. In 1994, he was appointed chair of the Commerce Commission and held that role until February 1998 when he was appointed Secretary to the Treasury. Bollard was the first person to be appointed from outside the Treasury in 80 years and remained in his post until 2002 when he was appointed Governor of the Reserve Bank of New Zealand. On leaving his post at the Treasury, Bollard was praised by finance minister Michael Cullen for having transformed Treasury into "a more open and outward looking organisation."

Bollard left the Reserve Bank in 2012 after completing two five-year terms. He was executive director of the Asia Pacific Economic Cooperation (APEC) secretariat for the period of 2013 to 2018. In August 2019, the Minister for Infrastructure, Shane Jones announced the appointment of Dr Alan Bollard as chair of the new Infrastructure Commission, Te Waihanga. His five year term concluded in 2024 and he was succeeded by Raveen Jaduram. In October 2024, Bollard was appointed to the Tertiary Education Commission board; he was appointed board chair in May 2025 after acting in that capacity since March.

== Recognition ==
In 1998, Bollard was elected a fellow of the Royal Society Te Apārangi. In the 2013 New Year Honours, Bollard was appointed a Companion of the New Zealand Order of Merit for services to the State.

== Bibliography ==
- Bollard, Alan; Gaitanos, Sarah (2012). Crisis. Auckland, New Zealand: Auckland University Press. ISBN 978-1-86940-740-7. OCLC 810911566.
- Bollard, Alan (2016). A Few Hares to Chase: The Life and Economics of Bill Phillips. Auckland: Auckland University Press. ISBN 978-1-86940-829-9.
- Bollard, Alan (2020). Economists at War. Oxford: Oxford University Press. ISBN 978-0-19-884600-0. OCLC 1125099211.
- Bollard, Alan (30 June 2023). Economists in the Cold War. Oxford; New York: Oxford University Press. ISBN 978-0-19-288739-9. OCLC 1358749107.

== Writings ==
- Design and evaluation of projects with variable labour response: case study of agricultural aid on Atiu (1977). PhD thesis. (Full text)

Government offices
Preceded by Dr Donald Brash	Governor of the Reserve Bank; 2002–2012	Succeeded by Graeme Wheeler
Preceded by Murray Horn	Secretary to the Treasury; 1998–2002	Succeeded by John Whitehead
Preceded by Susan Lojkine	Chair of the Commerce Commission; 1994–1998	Succeeded by John Belgrave
