= Sue Orr (writer) =

New Zealand author

- Born: 1962 (age 63–64); Thames, New Zealand
- Education: University of Waikato, Auckland Technical Institute, Victoria University of Wellington
- Occupations: Author and tutor
- Writing career
- Language: English
- Genres: Fiction, short stories
- Notable works: Etiquette for a Dinner Party: Short Stories, From Under the Overcoat, Loop Tracks
- Notable awards: People's Choice Award, Lilian Ida Smith Award

Sue Orr (born 1962) is a fiction writer, journalist and creative writing teacher from New Zealand.

== Background ==
Orr was born 1962 in Thames and spent her childhood on the Hauraki Plains. She has a BA in history and French from the University of Waikato, a Diploma in journalism from Auckland Technical Institute, and an MA and PhD in creative writing at Victoria University of Wellington.

She currently lives in Wellington, and teaches creative writing at Rimutaka and Arohata prisons, and in women's refuges in the region.

== Career ==
Orr has worked as a journalist in New Zealand (in Tokoroa, Tauranga, Wellington), the UK, and France. Since completing her MA in 2006, Orr has written fiction and taught creative writing at Manukau Institute of Technology and Massey University.

Orr has published four works of fiction:

- Etiquette for a Dinner Party: Short Stories (2008, Random House)
- From Under the Overcoat (2011, Random House)
- Recreation (2013, Random House)
- The Party Line (2015, Random House)
- Loop Tracks (2021, Victoria University Press)

Loop Tracks was inspired by a friend who used Sisters Overseas Service in the late 1970s to obtain an abortion. Set in Wellington, it covers many issues: abortion, adoption, euthanasia, family relationships and the Covid 19 lockdown.

Short stories by Orr have also appeared a number of anthologies including Best New Zealand Fiction 4, Lost in Translation: New Zealand Short Stories, and The Penguin Book of Contemporary New Zealand Short Stories. She has also been published in Sport 35, Turbine, and the New Zealand Listener.

== Awards ==
In 2008 Etiquette for a Dinner Party: Short Stories was long listed for the Frank O’Connor International Short Story Award and won the Lilian Ida Smith Award in 2007. It was also listed in the Top 100 Books of 2008 by the New Zealand Listener.

At the 2012 New Zealand Post Book Awards, From Under the Overcoat won the People's Choice Award.

In 2011 she received the Grimshaw Sargeson Fellowship with Mark Broatch.

== Personal life ==
Orr is married to economist Adrian Orr. They have three children.
