= T. P. Hanna =

New Zealand Chief Cashier 1940-1953

- Born: 19 November 1891
- Died: 12 March 1978
- Occupation: Chief Cashier

T. P. Hanna, full name Thomas Patterson Hanna, was best known for being the first chief cashier of the Reserve Bank of New Zealand.

After joining the Reserve Bank of New Zealand in 1934, Hanna set up the Chief Cashier's Department. Hanna was the first Chief Cashier - holding the role from 1940 to 1953.

As with the Chief Cashier of the Bank of England, between 1940 and 1984, New Zealand's banknotes were signed by the chief cashier. Therefore bank notes issued between 1940 and 1953 bear Hanna's signature.

== Roles ==
- Sub-inspector for the Bank of Australasia (1929–1934)
- Chief cashier, Reserve Bank of New Zealand, 1940-1953
- Member of the board of directors of the Reserve Bank of New Zealand (appointed 1953)
