= List of currencies =

A list of all currencies, current and historic. The local name of the currency is used in this list, with the adjectival form of the country or region.

== A ==
- Afghani – Afghanistan
- Akşa – Tuvan People's Republic
- Angolar –Angola
- Apsar – Abkhazia
- Argentino – Argentina
- Ariary – Madagascar
- Austral – Argentina
- Auksinas – Lithuania

== B ==
- Baht (บาท) – Thailand
- Balboa – Panama
- Birr – Ethiopia
- Bitcoin – El Salvador
- Bolívar – Venezuela
- Boliviano – Bolivia
- Budju – Algeria

== C ==
- Cedi – Ghana
- Ceiniog – Gwynedd, Powys
- Chervonets – Russia
- Colón
  - Costa Rican colón – Costa Rica
  - Salvadoran colón – El Salvador
- Continental currency – United States
- Conventionsthaler – Holy Roman Empire
- Copper – Vermont Republic
- Córdoba – Nicaragua
- Croat – Catalan Republic
- Crown
  - Austrian crown – Austria
  - Austro-Hungarian crown – Austria-Hungary
  - Bohemian and Moravian crown – Bohemia and Moravia
  - British crown – United Kingdom
  - Danish crown – Denmark
  - English crown – Kingdom of England
  - Estonian crown – Estonia
  - Faroese crown – Faroe Islands
  - Fiume crown – Free State of Fiume
  - Greenlandic crown – Greenland
  - Hungarian crown – Hungary
  - Icelandic crown – Iceland
  - Liechtenstein crown – Liechtenstein
  - Norwegian crown – Norway
  - Swedish crown – Sweden
  - Yugoslav crown – Yugoslavia
- Cruzado
  - Portuguese cruzado – Portugal
  - Brazilian cruzado – Brazil
  - Brazilian cruzado novo – Brazil
- Cruzeiro
  - Brazilian cruzeiro (old) – Brazil
  - Brazilian cruzeiro novo – Brazil
  - Brazilian cruzeiro (3rd iteration) – Brazil
  - Brazilian cruzeiro real – Brazil
- Cupon – Moldova
- Cryptocurrency – Internet-based currency
- Customs gold unit – Republic of China (1912–1949)

== D ==
- Dalasi – The Gambia
- Daler – Danish West Indies
- Dangka – Chin State, Mizoram, Lamka
- Denar – North Macedonia
- Denier – France
- Dinar (دينار)
  - Algerian dinar – Algeria
  - Bahraini dinar – Bahrain
  - Bosnia and Herzegovina dinar – Bosnia and Herzegovina
  - Croatian dinar – Croatia
  - Iraqi dinar – Iraq
  - Jordanian dinar – Jordan, Palestinian territories
  - Kelantanese dinar – Kelantan
  - Krajina dinar – Krajina
  - Kuwaiti dinar – Kuwait
  - Libyan dinar – Libya
  - Republika Srpska dinar – Republika Srpska
  - Serbian dinar – Serbia
  - South Yemeni dinar – South Yemen
  - Sudanese dinar – Sudan
  - Swiss dinar – Iraq
  - Tunisian dinar – Tunisia
  - Yugoslav dinar – Yugoslavia
- Diner – Andorra (commemorative only)
- Dinero – Spain
- Dinheiro – Portugal
- Dirham (درهم)
  - Moroccan dirham – Morocco
  - Emirati dirham – United Arab Emirates
- Dobra – São Tomé and Príncipe
- Dollar
  - Anguillan Liberty Dollar – Republic of Anguilla
  - Antigua dollar – Antigua
  - Australian dollar – Australia, Kiribati, Nauru and Tuvalu
  - Bahamian dollar – Bahamas
  - Barbadian dollar – Barbados
  - Belize dollar – Belize
  - Bermudian dollar – Bermuda
  - British Columbia dollar – British Columbia
  - British North Borneo dollar – British North Borneo
  - British West Indies dollar – British West Indies
  - Brunei dollar – Brunei
  - Canadian dollar – Canada
  - Cayman Islands dollar – Cayman Islands
  - Confederate States dollar – Confederate States of America
  - Continental dollar – Colonial America
  - Cook Islands dollar – Cook Islands
  - Dominican dollar – Dominica
  - Dogecoin - Cryptocurrency
  - East Caribbean dollar – Anguilla, Antigua and Barbuda, Dominica, Grenada, Montserrat, Saint Kitts and Nevis, Saint Lucia, Saint Vincent and the Grenadines
  - East Turkestan Dollar – Second East Turkestan Republic
  - Fijian dollar – Fiji
  - Grenadan dollar – Grenada
  - Guyanese dollar – Guyana
  - Hawaiian dollar – Hawaii
  - Hong Kong dollar – Hong Kong
  - International dollar – hypothetical currency pegged 1:1 to the United States dollar
  - Jamaican dollar – Jamaica
  - Japanese government-issued dollar – Brunei, Malaya, North Borneo, Sarawak, Singapore (Japanese occupied)
  - Kiautschou dollar – Qingdao
  - Kiribati dollar – Kiribati
  - Liberian dollar – Liberia
  - Malaya and British Borneo dollar – Malaya, Singapore, Sarawak, British North Borneo and Brunei
  - Malayan dollar – Brunei, Malaysia and Singapore
  - Mauritian dollar – Mauritius
  - Mongolian dollar – Mongolia
  - Namibian dollar – Namibia
  - Nevisian dollar – Nevis
  - New Brunswick dollar – New Brunswick
  - New Zealand dollar – New Zealand, Cook Islands, Niue, Tokelau, Pitcairn Islands.
  - Newfoundland dollar – Newfoundland
  - Niue dollar – Niue (not an independent currency, same currency as New Zealand dollar with slight differences)
  - Nova Scotian dollar – Nova Scotia
  - Penang dollar – Penang
  - Pitcairn Islands dollar – Pitcairn Islands (not an independent currency)
  - Prince Edward Island dollar – Prince Edward Island
  - Puerto Rican dollar – Puerto Rico
  - Rhodesian dollar – Rhodesia
  - RTGS dollar – Zimbabwe
  - Saint Kitts dollar – Saint Kitts
  - Saint Lucia dollar – Saint Lucia
  - Saint Vincent dollar – Saint Vincent
  - Sarawak dollar – Sarawak
  - Sierra Leonean dollar – Sierra Leone
  - Singapore dollar – Singapore
  - Solomon Islands dollar – Solomon Islands
  - Straits dollar – Brunei, Malaysia and Singapore
  - Sumatran dollar – Sumatra
  - Surinamese dollar – Suriname
  - Old Taiwan dollar – Taiwan
  - New Taiwan dollar – Taiwan
  - Texas dollar – Republic of Texas
  - Tobagonian dollar – Tobago
  - Trinidadian dollar – Trinidad
  - Trinidad and Tobago dollar – Trinidad and Tobago
  - Tuvaluan dollar – Tuvalu (not an independent currency, equivalent to Australian dollar)
  - United States dollar – United States
    - See also International use of the U.S. dollar
  - Zimbabwean dollar – Zimbabwe
- Đồng
  - North Vietnamese đồng – North Vietnam
  - South Vietnamese đồng – South Vietnam
  - Vietnamese đồng – Vietnam
- Drachma
  - Cretan Drachma – Cretan State
  - Greek Drachma (Δραχμή) – Greece
- Dram (Դրամ)
  - Armenian dram – Armenia
  - Artsakh dram – Artsakh
- Ducat – Two Sicilies

== E ==
- Ekwele (Ekuele) – Equatorial Guinea

See also: Scudo (below)

- Escudo
  - Angolan escudo – Angola
  - Cape Verdean escudo – Cape Verde
  - Chilean escudo – Chile
  - Mozambican escudo – Mozambique
  - Portuguese escudo – Portugal
  - Portuguese Guinean escudo – Guinea Bissau
  - Portuguese Indian escudo – Portuguese India
  - Portuguese Timorese escudo – East Timor
  - São Tomé and Príncipe escudo – São Tomé and Príncipe
  - Spanish escudo – Spain
- Euro (Eυρώ, Евро) – Austria, Belgium, Bulgaria, Croatia, Cyprus, Estonia, Finland, France, Germany, Greece, Ireland, Italy, Latvia, Lithuania, Luxembourg, Malta, Netherlands, Portugal, Slovakia, Slovenia, Spain
  - Countries that have made legal agreements with the EU to use the euro: Andorra, Monaco, San Marino, Vatican City
  - Countries that unilaterally use the euro: Montenegro, Kosovo
  - Currencies pegged to the euro: Cape Verdean escudo, CFA franc, CFP franc, Comorian franc, Bosnia and Herzegovina convertible mark, São Tomé and Príncipe Dobra.

== F ==
- Fanam – Madras Presidency
- Florin
  - Aruban florin – Aruba
  - Austrian florin – Austria
  - Austro-Hungarian florin – Austria-Hungary
  - Dutch florin – Netherlands
  - East African florin – Kenya, Tanganyika, Uganda and Zanzibar
  - Florentine florin – Florence
  - Hungarian florin – Hungary
  - Lombardo-Venetian florin – Lombardy–Venetia
  - Netherlands Antillean florin – Curaçao and Sint Maarten
  - Polish florin – Poland
  - Surinamese florin – Suriname
  - Tuscan florin – Tuscany
- Forint – Hungary
- Franc
  - Algerian franc – Algeria
  - Belgian franc – Belgium
  - Burundian franc – Burundi
  - Cambodian franc – Cambodia
  - Central African CFA franc – Cameroon, Central African Republic, Chad, Republic of the Congo, Equatorial Guinea, Gabon
  - CFP franc – New Caledonia, French Polynesia, Wallis and Futuna
  - Comorian franc – Comoros
  - Congolese franc – Democratic Republic of the Congo (replaced in 1967, re-established in 1998)
  - Djiboutian franc – Djibouti
  - French franc – France
  - French Afars and Issas Franc – French Territory of the Afars and the Issas
  - French Camerounian franc – French Cameroun
  - French Equatorial African franc – French Equatorial Africa
  - French Guianan franc – French Guiana
  - French Polynesian franc – French Polynesia
  - French West African franc – French West Africa
  - Geneva franc – Geneva
  - Guadeloupe franc – Guadeloupe
  - Guinean franc – Guinea (replaced in 1971, re-established in 1985)
  - Katangese franc – Katanga
  - Luxembourgish franc – Luxembourg
  - Malagasy franc – Madagascar
  - Malian franc – Mali
  - Martinique franc – Martinique
  - Monégasque franc – Monaco
  - Moroccan franc – Morocco
  - New Caledonian franc – New Caledonia
  - New Hebrides franc – New Hebrides
  - Réunion franc – Réunion
  - Rwanda and Burundi franc – Rwanda and Burundi
  - Rwandan franc – Rwanda
  - Saar franc – Saar
  - Saint Pierre and Miquelon franc – Saint Pierre and Miquelon
  - Swiss franc – Switzerland, Liechtenstein
  - Togolese franc – Togo
  - Tunisian franc – Tunisia
  - US occupation franc – France (issued and used by Allied soldiers, never backed by any government)
  - West African CFA franc – Benin, Burkina Faso, Côte d'Ivoire, Guinea-Bissau, Mali, Niger, Senegal, Togo
  - Vaud franc – Vaud
- Franco
  - Dominican franco – Dominican Republic
  - Ticino franco – Ticino
- Franga – Albania
- Frange – Korçë
- Frank
  - Aargau frank – Aargau
  - Appenzell frank – Appenzell
  - Basel frank – Basel
  - Berne frank – Bern
  - Fribourg frank – Fribourg
  - Glarus frank – Glarus
  - Graubünden frank – Graubünden
  - Liechtenstein frank – Liechtenstein
  - Luzern frank – Luzern
  - Schaffhausen frank – Schaffhausen
  - Schwyz frank – Schwyz
  - Solothurn frank – Solothurn
  - St. Gallen frank – St. Gallen
  - Thurgau frank – Thurgau
  - Unterwalden frank – Unterwalden
  - Uri frank – Uri
  - Vlorë frank – Vlorë
  - Westphalian frank – Westphalia
  - Zürich frank – Zürich

== G ==
- Gazeta (Γαζετα) – Septinsular Republic
- Genevoise – Geneva
- Gineih – Egypt
- Gold (ZiG) – Zimbabwe
- Gourde – Haiti
- Grivna
  - Ukrainian grivna – Ukraine
- Grosz – Kraków
- Grzywna
  - Kraków grzywna – Poland
- Guaraní – Paraguay
- Guilder
  - Aruban guilder – Aruba
  - Guilder – British Guiana
  - Dutch guilder – Netherlands
  - Netherlands Antillean guilder – Netherlands Antilles
  - Surinamese guilder – Suriname
- Guinea – United Kingdom
  - Egyptian guinea – Egypt
- Gulden
  - Austro-Hungarian gulden – Austria-Hungary
  - Baden gulden – Baden
  - Bavarian gulden – Bavaria
  - Danzig gulden – Danzig
  - Dutch gulden – Netherlands
  - Fribourg gulden – Fribourg
  - Luzern gulden – Luzern
  - Netherlands Antillean gulden – Netherlands Antilles
  - Netherlands Indian gulden – Netherlands Indies
  - Neuchâtel gulden – Neuchâtel
  - Schwyz gulden – Schwyz
  - South German gulden – Baden, Bavaria, Frankfurt, Hohenzollern, Württemberg and other states
  - Surinamese gulden – Suriname
  - West New Guinean gulden – West New Guinea
  - Württemberg gulden – Württemberg
  - Caribbean guilder – Curaçao, Sint Maarten

== H ==
- Hryvnia (Гривня) – Ukraine
- Hwan (圜 or 환) – South Korea

== I ==
- Inca – Peru
- Inti – Peru

== J ==
- Just - Cryptocurrency

== K ==
- Karbovanets
  - Ukrainian karbovanets – Ukraine
- Keping
  - Kelantan keping – Kelantan
  - Trengganu keping – Trengganu
- Kina – Papua New Guinea
- Kip – Laos
- Kite - Cryptocurrency
- Kolion – Russia
- Konvertibilna marka (Конвертибилна марка) – Bosnia and Herzegovina
- Kori – Kutch
- Korona – Hungary
- Koruna
  - Bohemian and Moravian koruna – Protectorate of Bohemia and Moravia
  - Czech koruna – Czech Republic
  - Czechoslovak koruna – Czechoslovakia
  - Slovak koruna – Slovak Republic (1939–1945)
  - Slovak koruna – Slovakia
- Koruuni – Greenland
- Króna
  - Faroese króna – Faroe Islands (not an independent currency, equivalent to Danish krone)
  - Icelandic króna – Iceland
- Krona – Sweden
- Krone
  - Austro-Hungarian krone – Austria-Hungary
  - Danish krone – Denmark, Greenland
  - Fiume krone – Free State of Fiume
  - Liechtenstein krone – Liechtenstein
  - Norwegian krone – Norway
  - Yugoslav krone – Yugoslavia
- Kronenthaler
  - Austrian Netherlands kronenthaler – Belgium
  - Holy Roman Empire kronenthaler – Holy Roman Empire
- Kroon – Estonia
- Kuna
  - Kuna – Croatia
  - Kuna – Independent State of Croatia
- Kwacha
  - Malawian kwacha – Malawi
  - Zambian kwacha – Zambia
- Kwanza – Angola
- Kyat – Myanmar

== L ==
- Laari – Maldives
- Lari (ლარი) – Georgia
- Lats – Latvia
- Lek – Albania
- Lempira – Honduras
- Leone – Sierra Leone
- Leu
  - Moldovan leu – Moldova
  - Romanian leu – Romania
- Lev (Лев) – Bulgaria
- Libra – Peru
- Lilangeni – Eswatini
- Lighter - Cryptocurrency

see also: Livre and pound (below)

- Lira
  - Israeli lira (לירה, pound) – Israel
  - Italian lira – Italy
  - Italian East African lira – Italian East Africa
  - Italian Somaliland lira – Italian Somaliland
  - Lebanese lira (ليرة) – Lebanon
  - Luccan lira – Lucca
  - Maltese lira – Malta
  - Neapolitan lira – Naples (Kingdom of Joachim Murat)
  - Ottoman Turkish lira – Ottoman Empire
  - Papal States lira – Papal States
  - Parman lira – Parma
  - Sammarinese lira – San Marino
  - Sardinian lira – Sardinia
  - Tripolitanian lira (ليرة) – Tripolitania
  - Turkish lira – Turkey, Northern Cyprus
  - Turkish new lira – Turkey, Northern Cyprus
  - Tuscan lira – Tuscany
  - Vatican lira – Vatican City
  - Venetian lira – Venice
  - Syrian lira – Syria
- Litas – Lithuania
- Livre
  - Egyptian livre – Egypt
  - French colonial livre – French Guiana, Guadeloupe, Haiti, Martinique, Mauritius and Réunion
  - French livre – France
  - Guadeloupe livre – Guadeloupe
  - Jersey livre – Jersey
  - Lebanese livre – Lebanon
  - French livre parisis – France
  - French livre tournois – France
  - Haitian livre – Haiti
  - New France livre – New France
  - Luxembourgish livre – Luxembourg
  - Saint Lucia livre – Saint Lucia
  - Syrian livre – Syria
  - Ottoman Turkish livre – Ottoman Empire
- Loti – Lesotho
- Luigino – Principality of Seborga

== M ==
- Mahlak – Emirate of Harar
- Manat
  - Azeri manat – Azerbaijan
  - Turkmenistani manat – Turkmenistan
- Maneti – Georgia
- Maravedí – Spain
- Mark
  - Bosnia and Herzegovina convertible mark – Bosnia and Herzegovina
  - Danzig Mark – Danzig
  - Estonian mark – Estonia
  - German mark – Germany
  - Gold mark – Germany, Kamerun, Togoland
  - German Papiermark – Germany
  - German reichsmark – Germany
  - German rentenmark – Germany
  - German South-West African Mark – German South-West Africa
  - East German mark – East Germany
  - Finnish mark – Finland
  - Hamburg mark – Hamburg
  - New Guinean mark – New Guinea
  - Polish mark – Poland
  - Saar Mark – Saar
- Marka
  - Bosnia and Herzegovina konvertibilna marka (конвертибилна марка) – Bosnia and Herzegovina
  - Polish marka – Poland
- Markka – Finland
- Metica – Mozambique (proposed)
- Metical – Mozambique
- Mohar – Nepal
- Mon
  - Mon – Japan
  - Mon – Ryukyu Kingdom
- Mun – Korea

== N ==
- Nahar – Chechnya (planned and printed but never used)
- Naira – Nigeria
- Nakfa – Eritrea
- New pence – Britain
- Ngultrum (དངུལ་ཀྲམ) – Bhutan
- Notgeld – German Empire, Weimar Republic
- Nouveau zaïre – Zaire

== O ==
- Obol – United States of the Ionian Islands
- ODE – Digital currencies
- Ora – Orania, South Africa
- Ostmark
  - Ostmark – Lithuania
  - East German mark – East Germany (known as the Ostmark, or "eastern mark")
- Ostrubel – Lithuania
- Ouguiya (أوقية) – Mauritania

== P ==
- Pa'anga – Tonga
- Paisa
  - Bangladeshi Paisa (পয়সা) – Bangladesh
  - Indian Paisa (पैसा) – India
  - Nepalese Paisa (पैसा) – Nepal
  - Pakistani Paisa (پیسہ) – Pakistan
- Pataca
  - Macanese pataca (澳門圓) – Macau
  - Maltese pataca – Malta
  - Portuguese Timorese pataca – Portuguese Timor
- Pengő – Hungary
- Penning
  - Swedish penning – Sweden
  - Norwegian penning – Norway
- Perper
  - Serbian perper – Serbia
  - Montenegrin perper – Montenegro
- Perun – Montenegro (proposed)
- Peseta
  - Catalan peseta – Catalunya
  - Equatorial Guinean peseta – Equatorial Guinea
  - Peruvian peseta – Peru
  - Sahrawi peseta – Sahrawi Arab Democratic Republic
  - Spanish peseta – Spain
- Peso
  - Argentine peso – Argentina
  - Argentine peso argentino – Argentina
  - Argentine peso ley – Argentina
  - Argentine peso moneda corriente – Argentina
  - Argentine peso moneda nacional – Argentina
  - Bolivian peso – Bolivia
  - Chilean peso – Chile
  - Colombian peso – Colombia
  - Costa Rican peso – Costa Rica
  - Cuban convertible peso – Cuba
  - Cuban peso – Cuba
  - Dominican peso – Dominican Republic
  - Ecuadorian peso – Ecuador
  - Guatemalan peso – Guatemala
  - Guinea Bissau peso – Guinea Bissau
  - Honduran peso – Honduras
  - Japanese government-issued Philippine fiat peso – Philippines
  - Malvinas Islands peso – Malvinas Islands (Falkland Islands)
  - Mexican peso – Mexico
  - New Granadan peso – Republic of New Granada
  - Nicaraguan peso – Nicaragua
  - Paraguayan peso – Paraguay
  - Philippine peso fuerte – Philippines
  - Philippine peso – Philippines
  - Puerto Rican peso – Puerto Rico
  - Salvadoran peso – El Salvador
  - Uruguayan peso – Uruguay
  - Venezuelan peso – Venezuela
- Petro – Venezuela
- Phoenix – Greece
- Piastra
  - Neapolitan piastra – mainland part of Two Sicilies
  - Sicilian piastra – Sicily
- Piastre
  - Cochinchina piastre – French Cochinchina
  - Cypriot piastre – Cyprus
  - Egyptian piastre – Egypt
  - Indochinese piastre – Cambodia, Laos and Vietnam
  - Jordanian piastre – Jordan
  - Lebanese piastre – Lebanon
  - Libyan piastre – Libya
  - Ottoman Turkish piastre – Ottoman Empire
  - Sudanese piastre
  - Syrian piastre – Syria
  - Turkish piastre – Turkey
- Piaster – South Sudan
- Piso – Philippines
- Pitis – Brunei
- Pond
  - Griqua pond – Griqualand East (Printed but never circulated)
  - Orange Free State pond – Orange Free State
  - Pond Vlaams – Burgundian Netherlands
  - South African Republic pond – Transvaal
- Pound
  - Alderney pound – Alderney (commemorative, not an independent currency)
  - Anglo-Saxon pound – Anglo-Saxon England
  - Australian pound – Australia
  - Bahamian pound – Bahamas
  - Bermudian pound – Bermuda
  - Biafran pound – Biafra
  - British West African pound – Cameroon, The Gambia, Ghana, Liberia, Nigeria and Sierra Leone
  - Canadian pound – Canada
  - Ceylonese pound – British Ceylon
  - Connecticut pound – Connecticut
  - Cypriot pound – Cyprus, Akrotiri and Dhekelia
  - Delaware pound – Delaware
  - Egyptian pound – Egypt
  - Falkland Islands pound – Falkland Islands
  - Fijian pound – Fiji
  - Flemish pound – Burgundian Netherlands
  - French colonial pound – French Guiana, Guadeloupe, Haiti, Martinique, Mauritius and Réunion
  - French pound – France
  - Gambian pound – The Gambia
  - Georgia pound – Georgia
  - Ghanaian pound – Ghana
  - Gibraltar pound – Gibraltar
  - Guadeloupe pound – Guadeloupe
  - Guernsey pound – Guernsey (not an independent currency)
  - Haitian pound – Haiti
  - Irish pound – Ireland
  - Israeli pound – Israel
  - Italian pound – Italy
  - Jersey pound – Jersey (not an independent currency)
  - Lebanese pound – Lebanon
  - Lebanese-Syrian pound – Jabal Druze State, Greater Lebanon, Syrian Federation
  - Libyan pound – Libya
  - Lombardo-Venetian pound – Lombardy–Venetia
  - Luccan pound – Lucca
  - Luxembourgish pound – Luxembourg
  - Malawian pound – Malawi
  - Maltese pound – Malta
  - Manx pound – Isle of Man (not an independent currency)
  - Maryland pound – Maryland
  - Massachusetts pound – Massachusetts
  - Natal pound – Natal
  - Neapolitan pound – Naples (Kingdom of Joachim Murat)
  - New Brunswick pound – New Brunswick
  - Newfoundland pound – Newfoundland
  - New France pound – New France
  - New Guinean pound – New Guinea
  - New Hampshire pound – New Hampshire
  - New Jersey pound – New Jersey
  - New South Wales Pound – New South Wales
  - New York pound – New York
  - New Zealand pound – New Zealand
  - Nigerian pound – Nigeria
  - North Carolina pound – North Carolina
  - Nova Scotian pound – Nova Scotia
  - Oceanian pound – Kiribati, Nauru, New Guinea, Solomon Islands and Tuvalu
  - Orange Free State pound – Orange Free State
  - Ottoman Turkish pound – Ottoman Empire
  - Palestine pound – British Mandate of Palestine
  - Papal pound – Papal states
  - Parisian pound – France
  - Parman pound – Parma
  - Pennsylvania pound – Pennsylvania
  - Peruvian pound – Peru
  - Pound sterling – United Kingdom, British Indian Ocean Territory (accepted)
  - Prince Edward Island pound – Prince Edward Island
  - Rhode Island pound – Rhode Island
  - Rhodesia and Nyasaland pound – Federation of Rhodesia and Nyasaland
  - Rhodesian pound – Rhodesia
  - Saint Helena pound – Saint Helena
  - Saint Lucia pound – Saint Lucia
  - Sammarinese pound – San Marino
  - Sardinian pound – Sardinia
  - Pound Scots – Kingdom of Scotland
  - Scottish pound sterling – Scotland (Same currency as Pound sterling but exclusively minted in Scotland)
  - Solomon Islands pound – Solomon Islands
  - South African pound – South Africa
  - South African Republic pound – Transvaal
  - South Carolina pound – South Carolina
  - Southern Rhodesian pound – Southern Rhodesia
  - Sudanese pound – Sudan
  - South Sudanese pound – South Sudan
  - South West African pound – South West Africa
  - Syrian pound – Syria
  - Van Diemen's Land Pound – Van Diemen's Land
  - Tongan pound – Tonga
  - Tours pound – France
  - Turkish pound – Turkey
  - Tuscan pound – Tuscany
  - Vatican pound – Vatican City
  - Venetian pound – Venice
  - Virginia pound – Virginia
  - West African pound – British West Africa
  - West Indian pound – British West Indies
  - Western Samoan pound – Samoa
  - Zambian pound – Zambia
- Puffin – Lundy (Unofficial, criminal and privately introduced)
- Pūl – Russian Turkestan
- Pula – Botswana
- Punt – Ireland

== Q ==
- Quetzal – Guatemala

== R ==
- Rai stones – Yap
- Rand – South Africa
- Reaal – Curaçao
- Real
  - Angolan real – Angola
  - Araucanía and Patagonia real – Kingdom of Araucanía and Patagonia
  - Argentine real – Argentina
  - Azorean real – Azores
  - Brazilian real (old) – Brazil
  - Brazilian real – Brazil
  - Cape Verde real – Cape Verde
  - Central American Republic real – Costa Rica, El Salvador, Guatemala, Honduras and Nicaragua
  - Colombian real – Colombia
  - Ecuadorian real – Ecuador
  - Gibraltar real – Gibraltar
  - Honduran real – Honduras
  - Mexican real – Mexico
  - Paraguayan real – Paraguay
  - Peruvian real – Peru
  - Philippine real – Philippines
  - Portuguese Guinea real – Guinea Bissau
  - Portuguese real – Portugal (plural réis)
  - Santo Domingo real – Santo Domingo
  - Salvadoran real – El Salvador
  - São Tomé and Príncipe real – São Tomé and Príncipe
  - Spanish colonial real – Argentina, Bolivia, Chile, Colombia, Costa Rica, Cuba, Dominican Republic, Ecuador, El Salvador, Guatemala, Honduras, Mexico, Nicaragua, Panama, Paraguay, Peru, Uruguay and Venezuela
  - Spanish real – Spain
  - Tucuman real – Republic of Tucumán
  - Venezuelan real – Venezuela
- Reichsmark – Germany
- Reichsthaler – Germany
- Renminbi (人民币 or 人民幣) – China
- Rentenmark – Germany
- Rial (ريال)
  - Moroccan rial – Morocco
  - North Yemeni rial – North Yemen
  - Omani rial – Oman
  - Tunisian rial – Tunisia
  - Yemeni rial – Yemen
- Riel – Cambodia
- Riffan – Republic of the Rif
- Rigsdaler
  - Danish West Indies rigsdaler – Danish West Indies
  - Danish rigsdaler – Denmark
  - Greenlandic rigsdaler – Greenland
  - Norwegian rigsdaler – Norway
- Riksdaler – Sweden
- Rijksdaalder – Netherlands
- Ringgit
  - Malaysian ringgit – Malaysia
  - Brunei ringgit – Brunei – known in English as the dollar
- Rixdollar – Ceylon
- Rial – Iran
- Riyal (ريال)
  - Hejazi riyal – Hejaz
  - Qatari riyal – Qatar
- Saudi riyal ( ) – Saudi Arabia
- Roepiah – Dutch East Indies
- Rouble (Рубль)
  - Armenian rouble – Armenia
  - Azerbaijani rouble – Azerbaijan
  - Belarusian rubel – Belarus
  - Don ruble – Don Republic
  - Far Eastern Republic Ruble – Far Eastern Republic
  - Georgian rouble – Georgia
  - Kuban ruble – Kuban People's Republic
  - Latvian rouble – Latvia
  - Odessa ruble – Odessa Soviet Republic
  - Russian rouble – Russia
  - Soviet rouble – Soviet Union
  - Tajikistani rouble – Tajikistan
  - Transcaucasian rouble – Transcaucasia
  - Transnistrian rubla – Transnistria
- Rublis – Latvia
- Rufiyaa (ދިވެހި ރުފިޔާ) – Maldives
- Rupee
  - Afghan rupee – Afghanistan
  - Bhutanese rupee – Bhutan
  - Burmese rupee – Burma
  - Cocos Rupee – Cocos (Keeling) Islands (privately introduced)
  - Danish Indian rupee – Danish India
  - East African rupee – Kenya, Somalia, Tanzania and Uganda
  - French Indian rupee – French India
  - Gulf rupee – Bahrain, Kuwait, Oman, Qatar and United Arab Emirates
  - Hyderabad rupee – Hyderabad
  - Indian rupee (रुपया) – India
  - Javan rupee – Java
  - Mauritian rupee – Mauritius
  - Nepalese rupee (रुपैयाँ) – Nepal
  - Pakistani rupee (روپیہ) – Pakistan
  - Portuguese Indian rupia – Portuguese India
  - Seychellois rupee – Seychelles
  - Sikkimese rupee – Kingdom of Sikkim
  - Sri Lankan rupee (රුපියල්, ரூபாய்) – Sri Lanka
  - Travancore rupee – Travancore
  - Zanzibari rupee – Zanzibar
- Rupiah
  - Indonesian rupiah – Indonesia
  - Italian Somaliland rupia – Italian Somaliland
  - Riau rupiah – Riau
  - West New Guinea rupiah – West New Guinea
- Rupie – German East Africa, Tanganyika
- Ryal – Sultanate of Zanzibar
- Ryō – Japan

== S ==
- Schilling – Austria
- Scudo
  - Bolivian scudo – Bolivia
  - Lombardy-Venetia scudo – Lombardy-Venetia
  - Maltese scudo – Malta
  - Milanese scudo – Milan
  - Papal States scudo – Papal States
  - Piedmont scudo – Piedmont and other mainland parts of the Kingdom of Sardinia
  - Sardinian scudo – Sardinia
- Setu (Historically used in Southern India and Sri Lanka)
- Shah (Шаг) – Ukraine
- Shekel
  - New Shekel (שקל חדש) – Israel, Gaza Strip, West Bank
  - Shekel (שקל) – Israel, Gaza Strip, West Bank
- Shilling
  - East African shilling – Kenya, Somalia, Tanzania and Uganda
  - Hudson's Bay Company shilling – Hudson's Bay Company, Red River Colony
  - Kenyan shilling – Kenya
  - Limerick Soviet Notes (Shilling) – Limerick Soviet
  - Puntland shilling – Puntland (Not finalised)
  - Sun-Cryptocurrency
  - Somali shilling – Somalia
  - Somaliland shilling – Somaliland
  - Tanzanian shilling – Tanzania
  - Ugandan shilling – Uganda
- Skender – Korçë
- Sol
  - Bolivian Sol – Bolivia
  - Sol – Peru
  - Sol de oro – Peru
- Soum
  - Kyrgyz som (Сом) – Kyrgyzstan
  - Uzbek soum (Сўм) – Uzbekistan
- Somalo – Italian Somaliland
- Somoni (Сомонӣ) – Tajikistan
- Speciedaler – Norway
- Speciethaler – Schleswig-Holstein
- Srang – Tibet
- Sterling – United Kingdom
- Sucre – Ecuador
- Syli – Guinea

== T ==
- Tael (兩, liǎng) – China
- Taka (টাকা) – Bangladesh
- Tala – Samoa
- Tallero – Eritrea
- Talonas – Lithuania
- Tangka – Tibet
- Tenga
  - Bukharan tenga – Bukhara
  - Kokand tenga – Kokand
  - Khwarazmi tenga – Khwarazm
- Tenge (Теңге) – Kazakhstan
- Thaler – Germany, Austria, Hungary
  - Basel Thaler – Basel
  - Berne Thaler – Bern
  - Bremen Thaler – Bremen
  - Danzig Thaler – Danzig
  - Geneva thaler – Geneva
  - Hannovarian Thaler – Hannover
  - Hesse-Kassel Thaler – Hesse-Kassel (or Hesse-Cassel)
  - Mecklenburg Thaler – Mecklenburg
  - Prussian Thaler – Prussia
  - St. Gallen Thaler – St. Gallen
  - Saxon Thaler – Kingdom of Saxony
  - Solothurn Thaler – Solothurn
  - Valais thaler – Valais
  - Westphalian Thaler – Westphalia
  - Zürich Thaler – Zürich
- Tical – Cambodia
- Tilla – Emirate of Bukhara
- Tögrög (Tөгрөг) – Mongolia
- Token
  - Griqua Token – Griqualand East
  - Trade Token – Hudson's Bay Company, North West Company, Red River Colony (Equivalent to equal amount of beaver skin)
- Tolar – Slovenia
- Toman (تومان) – Iran
- Trade dollar
  - British trade dollar – Great Britain
  - Japanese trade dollar – Japan
  - United States trade dollar – United States
- Tugrik – Mongolia
- Tumen – Mountainous Republic of the Northern Caucasus, North Caucasian Emirate

== V ==
- Vatu – Vanuatu
- Venezolano – Venezuela
- Vereinsthaler
  - Hanoverian vereinsthaler – Hanover
  - Hesse-Kassel vereinsthaler – Hesse-Kassel (or Hesse-Cassel)
  - Mecklenburg vereinsthaler – Mecklenburg
  - Prussian vereinsthaler – Prussia
  - Saxon vereinsthaler – Saxony
  - Molossian Valora- Republic of Molossia (Micronation)

== W ==
- Wén (文) – China
- Won (원,圓)
  - Korean won – Korean Empire
  - Korean won – People's Republic of Korea (1945-1946)
  - Korean People's won – North Korea
  - Korean Republic won – South Korea

== Y ==
- Yang (兩) – Korea
- Yen (円)
  - Korean yen – Korea
  - Japanese military yen – Hong Kong
  - Japanese yen – Japan
  - Taiwanese yen – Taiwan
- Yuan
  - Yuan (元, 圆 or 圓) – China
  - Chinese yuan (元, 圆 or 圓) – China
  - Chinese renminbi yuan (人民币 or 人民幣) – China
  - Manchukuo yuan (圓) – Manchukuo
  - Mengjiang yuan (蒙疆銀行圓) – Mengjiang
  - Old Taiwanese yuan – Taiwan
  - New Taiwanese yuan – Taiwan

== Z ==
- Zaire – Zaire
- Złoty – Poland

== See also ==
- List of circulating currencies
- List of countries by exchange rate regime
- List of central banks
- ISO 4217
