= Livre =

Livre may refer to:

== Currency ==
- French livre, one of a number of obsolete units of currency of France
- Livre tournois, one particular obsolete unit of currency of France
- Livre parisis, another particular obsolete unit of currency of France
- French colonial livre, an obsolete unit of currency used in some French colonies
- Haitian livre, an obsolete currency of Haiti
- Luxembourg livre, an obsolete currency of Luxembourg
- New France livre, an obsolete currency of New France
- Saint Lucia livre, an obsolete currency of Saint Lucia
- Jersey livre, an obsolete currency of the island of Jersey
- Guadeloupe livre, an obsolete currency of Guadeloupe
- Lebanese pound (French: livre), the currency of Lebanon
- Syrian pound, the currency of Syria, formerly with the French name livre

== Other uses ==
- LIVRE, a Portuguese politically green and liberal socialist political party
- One of a number of units of mass; see: pound (mass)
- One of a number of units of currency; see: pound (currency)
- A rating of the Brazilian advisory rating system

== See also ==
- Liver (disambiguation)
- Libre (disambiguation)
