= Old Swiss Confederacy =

1291–1798 confederation of Swiss cantons

Swiss Confederacy Corpus helveticum (German) Corps helvétique (French) Corpo helvetico (Italian) Confoederatio helvetica (Latin)
- 1291–1798
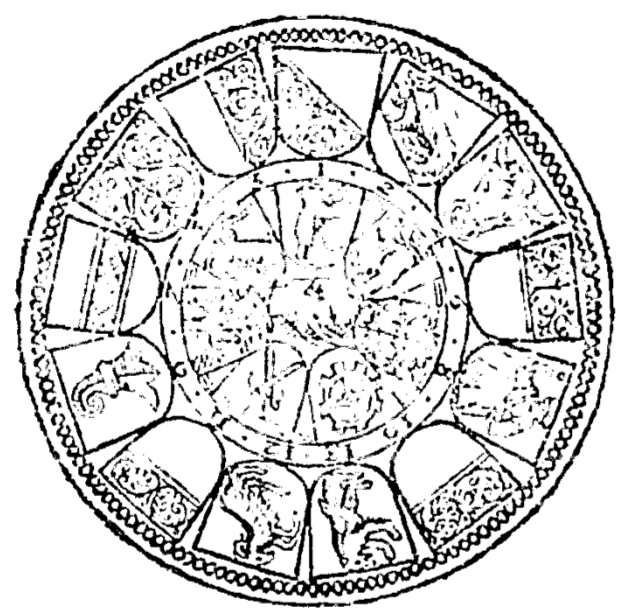
- Swiss cross (field sign c. 1470–1500) Cantonal coats of arms of the Thirteen Cantons

- Capital: None
- Official languages: German
- Common languages: Middle French/French; Alemannic German; Lombard; Rhaeto-Romansh
- Religion: Roman Catholic; Continental Reformed
- Demonym: Swiss
- Government: Confederation
- Legislature: Tagsatzung
- History
  - Death of Rudolf I: 15 July 1291
  - Rütlischwur, Burgenbruch: 1 August 1291
  - Charles IV's Golden Bull: 1356
  - Battle of Marignano: 13–14 September 1515
  - Wars of Kappel: 1529 and 1531
  - Formal independence from the HRE: 15 May/24 October 1648
  - Swiss peasant war: January–June 1653
  - French invasion: 5 March 1798
- Currency: About 75 different local currencies, including Basel thaler, Berne thaler, Fribourg gulden, Geneva thaler, Geneva genevoise, Luzern gulden, Neuchâtel gulden, St. Gallen thaler, Schwyz gulden, Solothurn thaler, Valais thaler, Zürich thaler
Preceded by
House of Habsburg
House of Zähringen
House of Kyburg
House of Werdenberg
Imperial Abbey of Saint Gall
Duchy of Milan
Barony of Vaud
Duchy of Burgundy
Holy Roman Empire
Succeeded by
Helvetic Republic
French First Republic
Cisalpine Republic
- Today part of: Switzerland; Italy

The Old Swiss Confederacy, also known as Switzerland or the Swiss Confederacy, was a loose confederation of independent small states (German: Orte or Stände, French: cantons), initially within the Holy Roman Empire. It is the precursor of the modern state of Switzerland.

It formed at the end of the 13th century, from a nucleus in what is now Central Switzerland, expanding to include the cities of Zurich and Bern by the middle of the 14th century. This formed a rare union of rural and urban communes, all of which enjoyed imperial immediacy in the Holy Roman Empire.

This confederation of eight cantons (Acht Orte) was politically and militarily successful for more than a century, culminating in the Burgundy Wars of the 1470s which established it as a power in the complicated political landscape dominated by France and the Habsburgs. Its success resulted in the addition of more confederates, increasing the number of cantons to thirteen (Dreizehn Orte) by 1513. The confederacy pledged neutrality in 1647 (under the threat of the Thirty Years' War), although many Swiss served privately as mercenaries in the Italian Wars and during the early modern period.

After the Swabian War of 1499 the confederacy was a de facto independent state throughout the early modern period, although still nominally part of the Holy Roman Empire until 1648 when the Treaty of Westphalia ended the Thirty Years' War. The Swiss Reformation divided the confederates into Reformed and Catholic parties, resulting in internal conflict from the 16th to the 18th centuries; as a result, the federal diet (Tagsatzung) was often paralysed by hostility between the factions. The Swiss Confederacy fell to a French invasion in 1798, after which it became the short-lived Helvetic Republic.

== Name ==
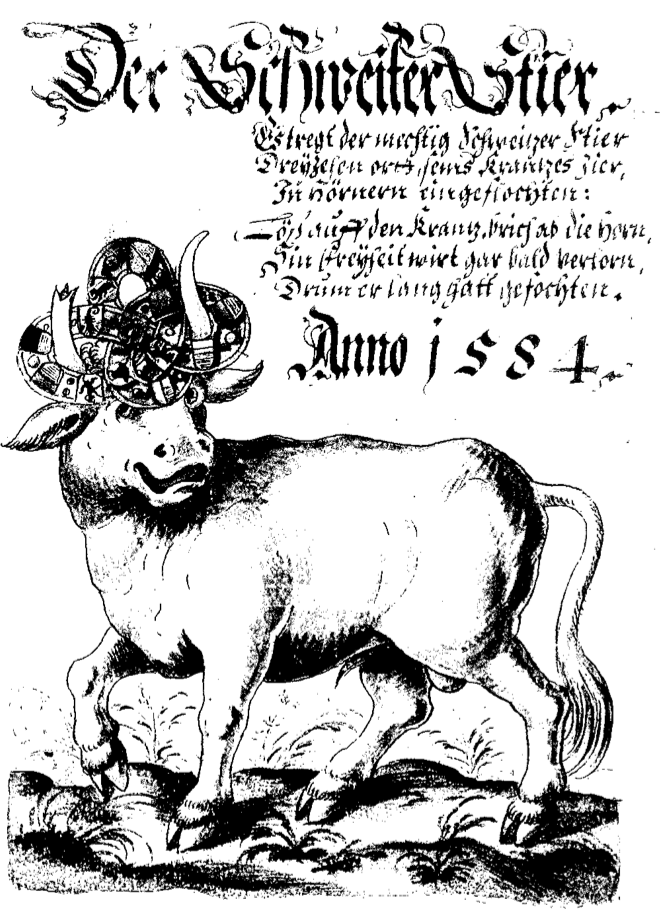
The "Swiss Bull" (Der Schweitzer Stier), horns decorated with a wreath showing the coats of arms of the Thirteen Cantons of the Confederacy (1584)

The adjective "old" was introduced after the Napoleonic era with Ancien Régime, retronyms distinguishing the pre-Napoleonic from the restored confederation. During its existence the confederacy was known as Eidgenossenschaft or Eydtgnoschafft ("oath fellowship"), in reference to treaties among cantons; this term was first used in the 1370 Pfaffenbrief. Territories of the confederacy came to be known collectively as Schweiz or Schweizerland (Schwytzerland in contemporary spelling), with the English Switzerland beginning during the mid-16th century. From that time the Confederacy was seen as a single state, also known as the Swiss Republic (German: Republic der Schweitzer, French: République des Suisses and Latin: Republica Helvetiorum by Josias Simmler in 1576) after the fashion of calling individual urban cantons republics (such as the Republics of Zürich, Berne and Basel).

== History ==
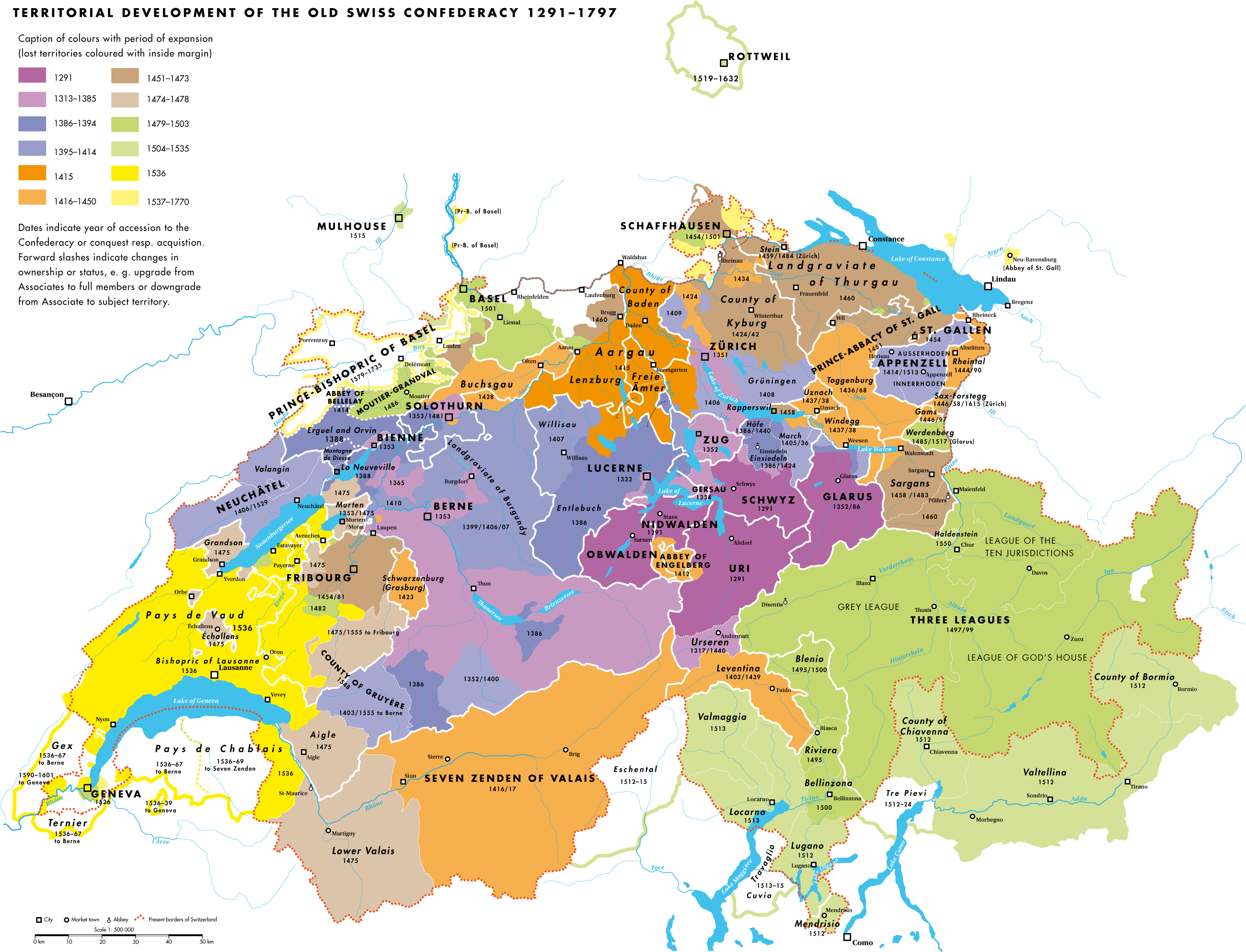
Territorial development of Old Swiss Confederacy, 1291–1797

Old Swiss Confederacy within the Holy Roman Empire in 1356 ( dark purple)

=== Foundation ===
The nucleus of the Old Swiss Confederacy was an alliance among the valley communities of the central Alps to facilitate management of common interests (such as trade) and ensure peace along trade routes through the mountains. Previously, the communities, also known collectively as the "Forest States", had been granted imperial immediacy and autonomy during the reign of the Hohenstaufens. The region was endowed with these privileges because the Gotthard Pass went through the area. This pass was important in the Hohenstaufen struggle against the Italian Lombard League.

Due to the fragmentation of Swabia following the collapse of the Hohenstaufens, many nations began to compete for land. The Habsburgs in particular were a major threat to the Swiss states. King Rudolf I added large amounts of territory in Switzerland and Swabia to his domain, and defeated Bernese forces at the Battle of Schosshalde in 1289 to enforce imperial taxes. This aggression from the Habsburgs would likely be a major factor in the creation of the Swiss Confederacy.

The foundation of the Confederacy is marked by the Rütlischwur (dated to 1307 by Aegidius Tschudi) or the 1315 Pact of Brunnen. Since 1889, the Federal Charter of 1291 among the rural communes of Uri, Schwyz, and Unterwalden has been considered the founding document of the confederacy.

The early Swiss Confederacy was simply a defensive pact, but over time the states grew closer and closer. Following a victory against the Habsburgs in 1315, the members of the Confederacy vowed not to form alliances with outside states without the consent of the rest of the Confederacy. They also agreed to resolve all disputes peacefully and to support one another in both external and internal affairs. At this point, however, the Swiss were still subordinate to the Empire, and they acknowledged the authority of the Holy Roman Empire.

=== Expansion ===
The initial pact was augmented by pacts with the cities of Lucerne, Zurich, and Bern. This union of rural and urban communes, which enjoyed the status of imperial immediacy within the Holy Roman Empire, was engendered by pressure from Habsburg dukes and kings who had ruled much of the land. Bern in particular had fought against local nobles, including the Habsburgs, on several occasions, and as such was eager to join the Confederacy. In several battles with Habsburg armies, the Swiss were victorious; they conquered the rural areas of Glarus and Zug, which became members of the confederacy. This expansion greatly changed the social climate in the Confederacy. In the original 3 cantons, citizens all held equal rights, but in the newly acquired urban cities, power was in the hands of the wealthy Burgomeisters. This led to a shift away from the traditional Swiss egalitarianism enjoyed by citizens in the original Confederacy.

From 1353 to 1481, the federation of eight cantons—known in German as the Acht Orte (Eight Cantons)—consolidated its position. The members (especially the cities) enlarged their territory at the expense of local counts—primarily by buying judicial rights, but sometimes by force. The Eidgenossenschaft, as a whole, expanded through military conquest: the Aargau was conquered in 1415 and the Thurgau in 1460. In both cases, the Swiss profited from weakness in the Habsburg dukes. In the south, Uri led a military territorial expansion that (after many setbacks) would by 1515 lead to the conquest of the Ticino. None of these territories became members of the confederacy; they had the status of condominiums (regions administered by several cantons).

The reason for these Swiss victories was their innovative military tactics. Their perfection of the Pike Square made them excellent defensive warriors in their home mountain terrain, and they became highly sought after mercenaries throughout Europe (ex Swiss mercenaries).

At this time, the eight cantons gradually increased their influence on neighbouring cities and regions through additional alliances. Individual cantons concluded pacts with Fribourg, Appenzell, Schaffhausen, the abbot and the city of St. Gallen, Biel, Rottweil, Mulhouse and others. These allies (known as the Zugewandte Orte) became closely associated with the confederacy, but were not accepted as full members. They would be known as Swiss Associates.

The Burgundian Wars prompted a further enlargement of the confederacy; Fribourg and Solothurn were accepted in 1481. By defeating the Duchy of Burgundy in this war, the Confederacy managed to stop the growing Burgundian threat. In the Swabian War against Holy Roman Emperor Maximilian I, the Swiss were victorious and exempted from imperial legislation. The associated cities of Basel and Schaffhausen joined the confederacy as a result of that conflict, and Appenzell followed suit in 1513 as the thirteenth member. The federation of thirteen cantons (Dreizehn Orte) constituted the Old Swiss Confederacy until its demise in 1798.

The expansion of the confederacy was stopped by the Swiss defeat in the 1515 Battle of Marignano. Only Bern and Fribourg were still able to conquer the Vaud in 1536; the latter primarily became part of the canton of Bern, with a small portion under the jurisdiction of Fribourg.

=== Reformation ===
The forces of Zürich are defeated in the Second War of Kappel.

The Reformation in Switzerland led to doctrinal division amongst the cantons. Zürich, Bern, Basel, Schaffhausen and associates Biel, Mulhouse, Neuchâtel, Geneva and the city of St. Gallen became Protestant; other members of the confederation and the Valais remained Catholic. In Glarus, Appenzell, in the Grisons and in most condominiums both religions coexisted; Appenzell split in 1597 into a Catholic Appenzell Innerrhoden and a Protestant Appenzell Ausserrhoden.

The division led to civil war (the Wars of Kappel) and separate alliances with foreign powers by the Catholic and Protestant factions, but the confederacy as a whole continued to exist. A common foreign policy was blocked, however, by the impasse. During the Thirty Years' War, religious disagreements among the cantons kept the confederacy neutral and spared it from belligerents. At the Peace of Westphalia, the Swiss delegation was granted formal recognition of the confederacy as a state independent of the Holy Roman Empire.

=== Early modern period ===
Growing social differences and an increasing absolutism in the city cantons during the Ancien Régime led to local popular revolts. An uprising during the post-war depression after the Thirty Years' War escalated to the Swiss peasant war of 1653 in Lucerne, Bern, Basel, Solothurn and the Aargau. The revolt was put down swiftly by force and with the help of many cantons.

Religious differences were accentuated by a growing economic discrepancy. The Catholic, predominantly rural central-Swiss cantons were surrounded by Protestant cantons with increasingly commercial economies. The politically dominant cantons were Zürich and Bern (both Protestant), but the Catholic cantons were influential since the Second War of Kappel in 1531. A 1655 attempt (led by Zürich) to restructure the federation was blocked by Catholic opposition, which led to the first battle of Villmergen in 1656; the Catholic party won, cementing the status quo.

The problems remained unsolved, erupting again in 1712 with the second battle of Villmergen. This time, the Protestant cantons won, dominating the confederation. True reform, however, was impossible; the individual interests of the thirteen members were too diverse, and the absolutist cantonal governments resisted all attempts at confederation-wide administration. Foreign policy remained fragmented.

== Structure ==
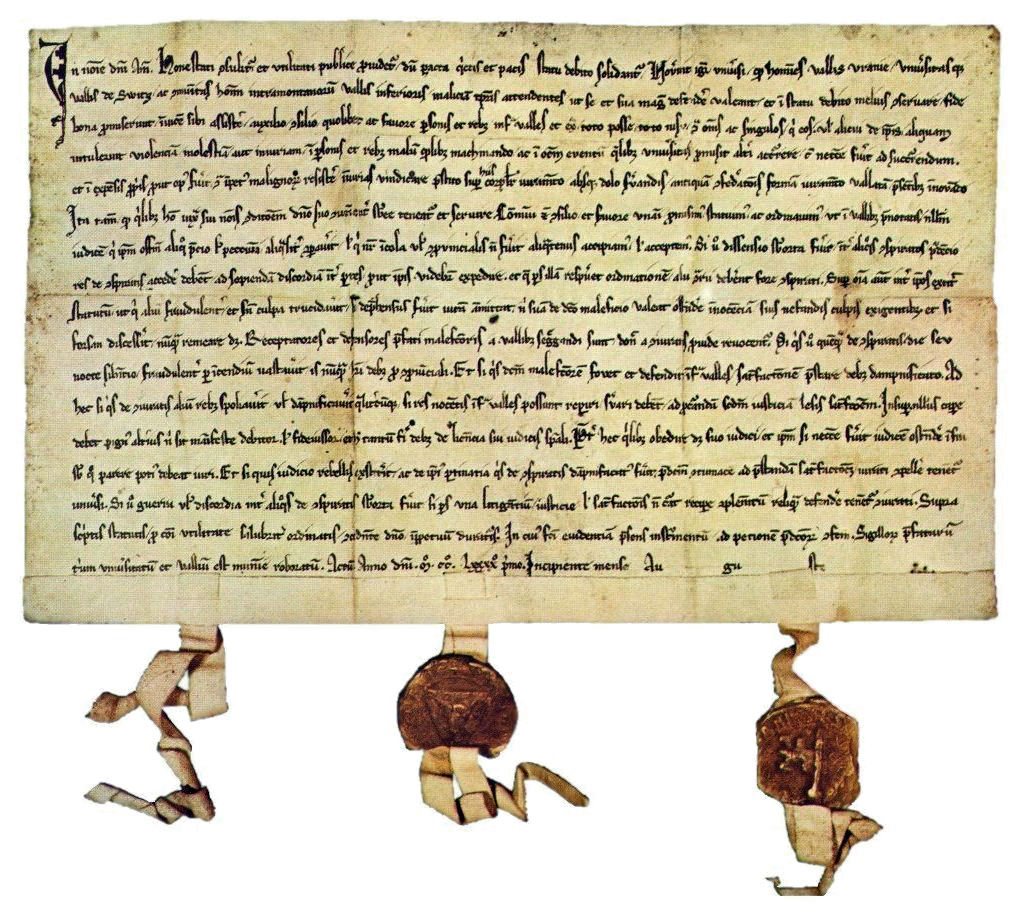
Federal Charter of 1291

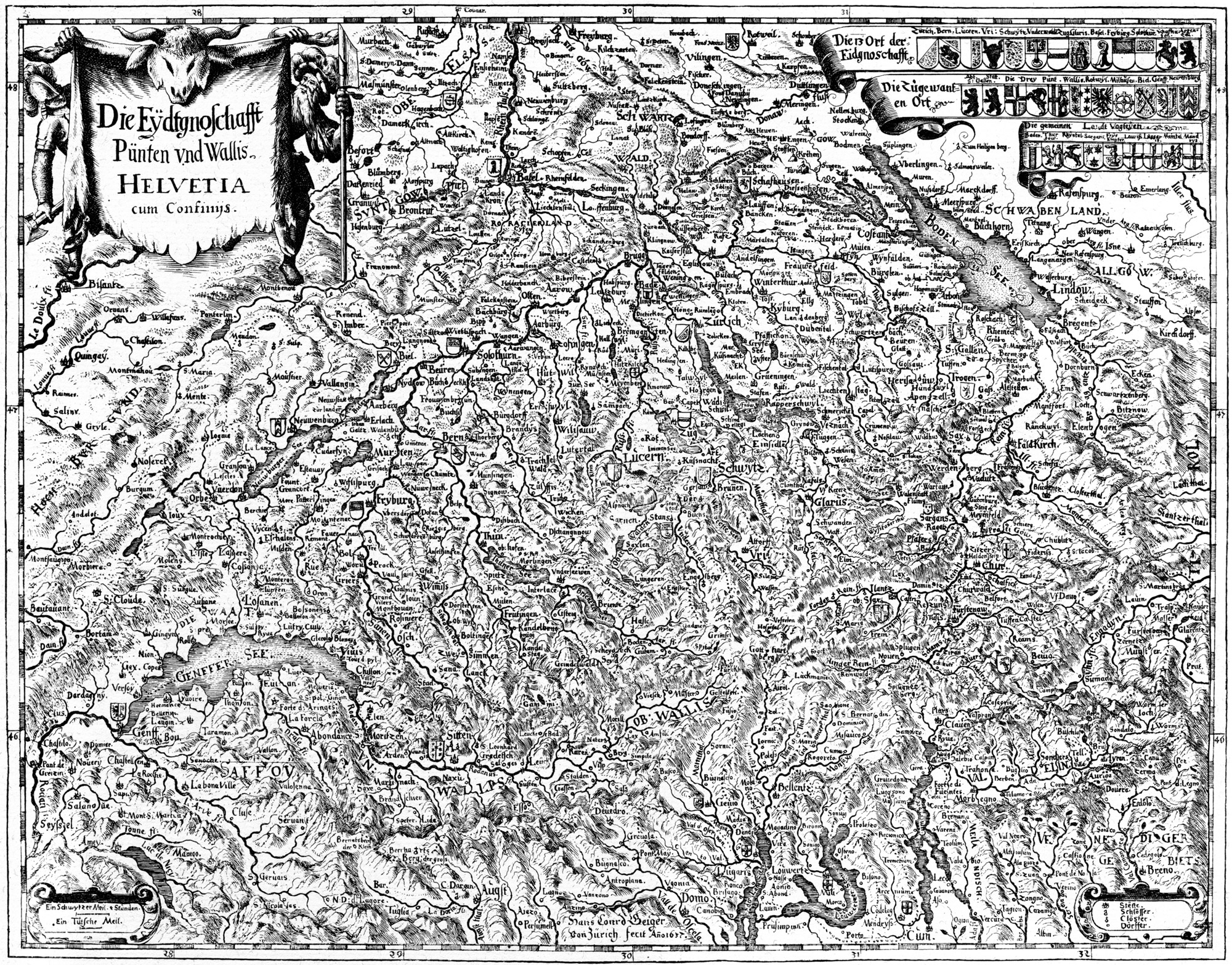
Old Swiss Confederacy on 1637 map

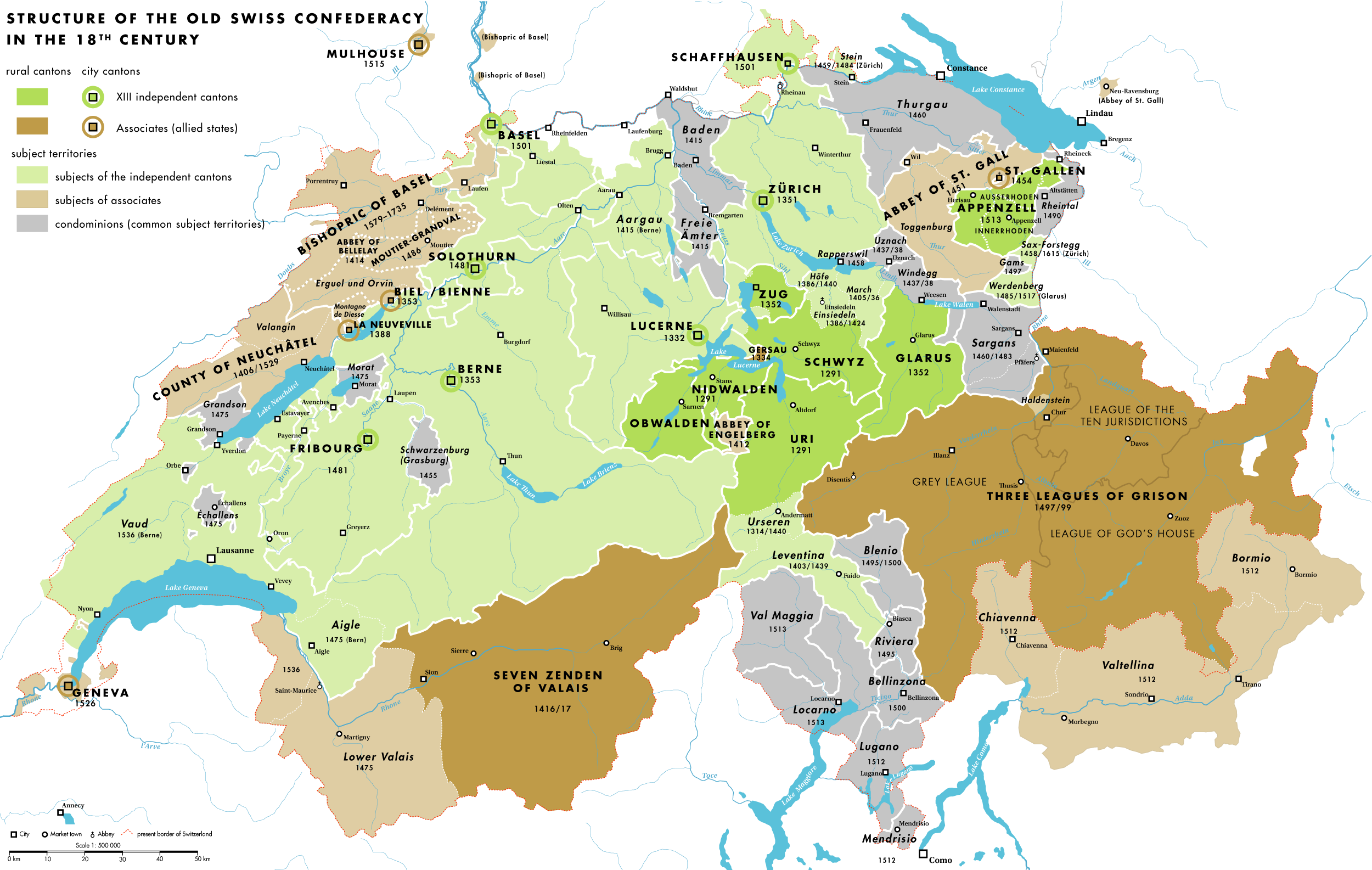
Old Swiss Confederacy in the 18th century

The (Alte) Eidgenossenschaft was initially united not by a single pact, but by overlapping pacts and bilateral treaties between members. The parties generally agreed to preserve the peace, aid in military endeavours and arbitrate disputes. Slowly, the members began to see the confederation as a unifying entity. In the Pfaffenbrief, a treaty of 1370 among six of the eight members (Glarus and Bern did not participate) forbidding feuds and denying clerical courts jurisdiction over the confederacy, the cantons for the first time used the term Eidgenossenschaft. The first treaty uniting the eight members of the confederacy was the Sempacherbrief of 1393, concluded after victories over the Habsburgs at Sempach in 1386 and Näfels in 1388, which forbade a member from unilaterally beginning a war without the consent of the other cantons. A federal diet, the Tagsatzung, developed during the 15th century.

Pacts and renewals (or modernizations) of earlier alliances reinforced the confederacy. The individual interests of the cantons clashed in the Old Zürich War (1436–1450), caused by territorial conflict among Zürich and the central Swiss cantons over the succession of the Count of Toggenburg. Although Zürich entered an alliance with the Habsburg dukes, it then rejoined the confederacy. The confederation had become so close a political alliance that it no longer tolerated separatist tendencies in its members.

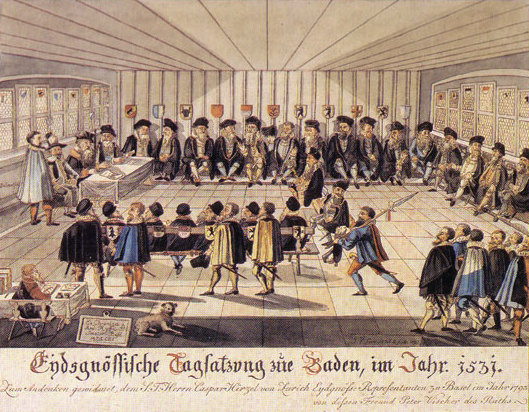
Tagsatzung of 1531 in Baden (1790s drawing)

The Tagsatzung was the confederation council, typically meeting several times a year. Each canton delegated two representatives (including the associate states, which had no vote). The canton where the delegates met initially chaired the gathering, but during the 16th century Zürich permanently assumed the chair (Vorort) and Baden became the seat. The Tagsatzung dealt with inter-cantonal affairs and was the court of last resort in disputes between member states, imposing sanctions on dissenting members. It also administered the condominiums; the reeves were delegated for two years, each time by a different canton.

A unifying treaty of the Old Swiss Confederacy was the Stanser Verkommnis of 1481. Conflicts between rural and urban cantons and disagreements over the bounty of the Burgundian Wars had led to skirmishes. The urban cantons of Bern, Zurich, and Luzern in particular wanted to keep a large share of the bounty. The city-states of Fribourg and Solothurn wanted to join the confederacy, but were mistrusted by the central Swiss rural cantons. The compromise by the Tagsatzung in the Stanser Verkommnis restored order and assuaged the rural cantons' complaints, with Fribourg and Solothurn accepted into the confederation. While the treaty restricted freedom of assembly (many skirmishes arose from unauthorised expeditions by soldiers from the Burgundian Wars), it reinforced agreements amongst the cantons in the earlier Sempacherbrief and Pfaffenbrief.

The civil war during the Reformation ended in a stalemate. The Catholic cantons could block council decisions but, due to geographic and economic factors, could not prevail over the Protestant cantons. Both factions began to hold separate councils, still meeting at a common Tagsatzung (although the common council was deadlocked by disagreements between both factions until 1712, when the Protestant cantons gained power after their victory in the second war of Villmergen). The Catholic cantons were excluded from administering the condominiums in the Aargau, the Thurgau and the Rhine valley; in their place, Bern became co-sovereign of these regions.

== List of territories ==
=== Cantons ===
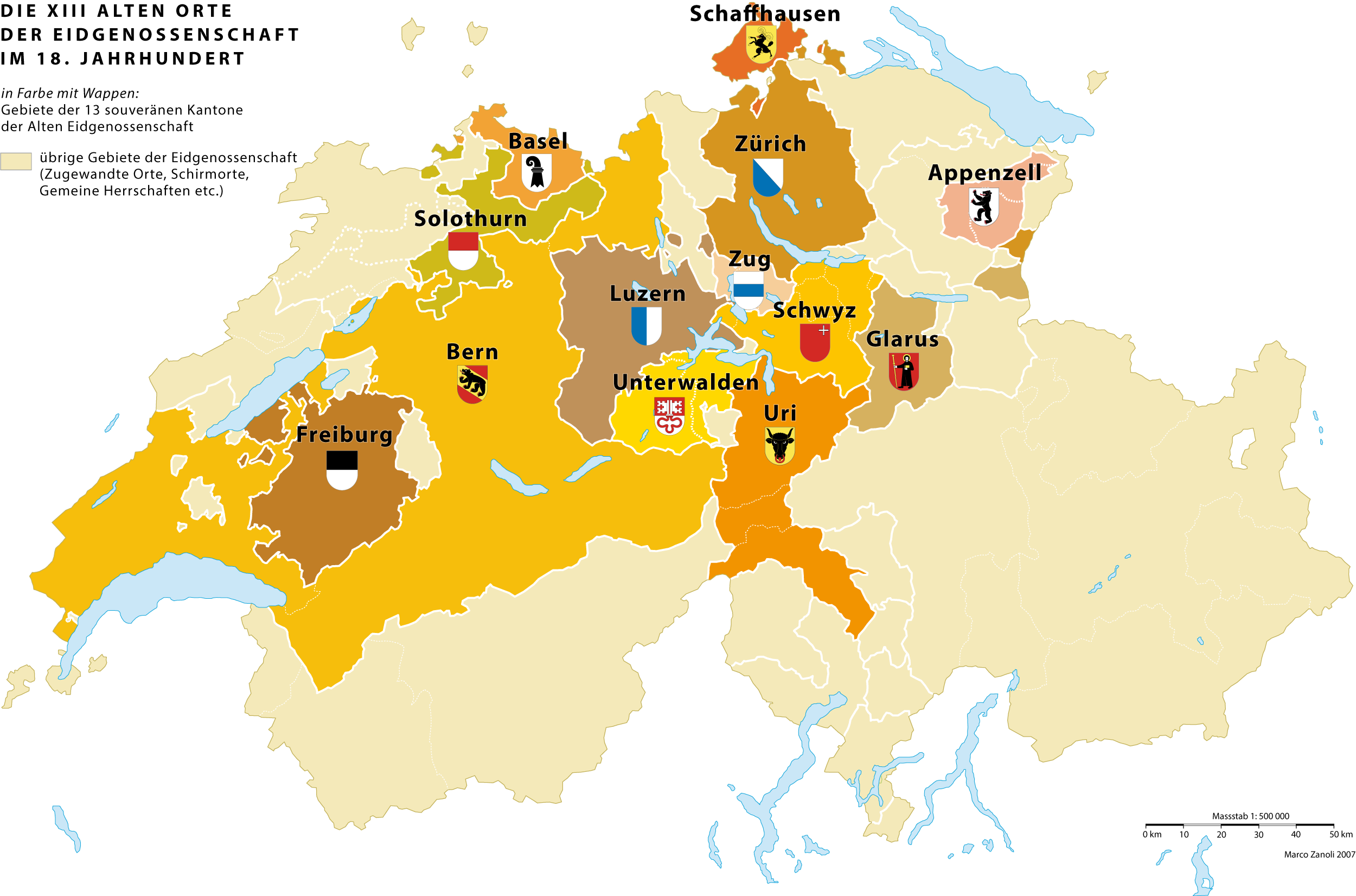
The 13 cantons of the Old Swiss Confederacy

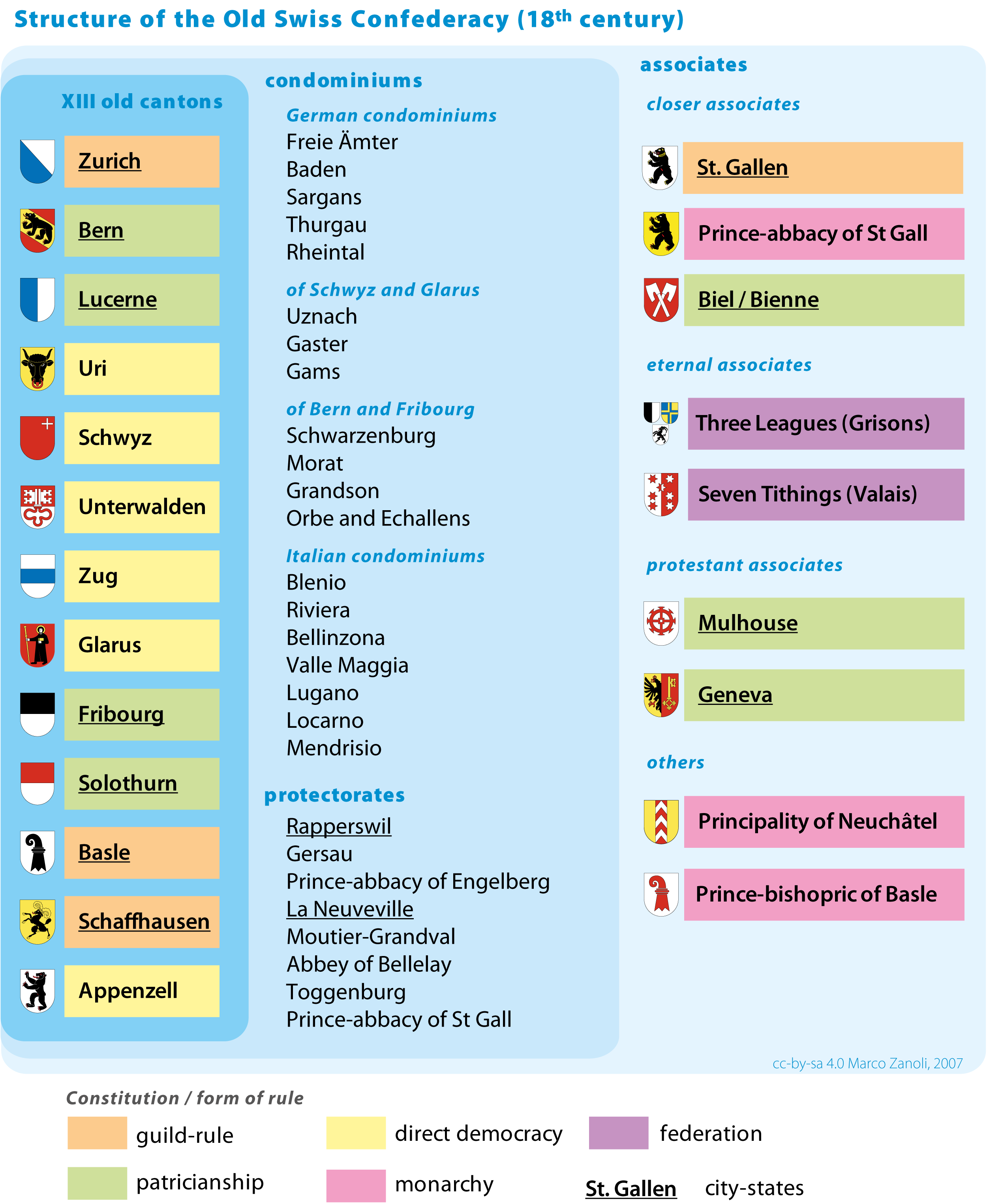
Structure of the Confederacy during the 18th century

The confederation expanded in several stages: first to the Eight Cantons (Acht Orte), then in 1481 to ten, in 1501 to twelve, and finally to thirteen cantons (Dreizehn Orte).

- Founding cantons (Urkantone):
  - Uri, founding canton named in the Federal Charter of 1291
  - Schwyz, founding canton named in the Federal Charter of 1291
  - Unterwalden, founding canton named in the Federal Charter of 1291, later split into Obwalden and Nidwalden
- 14th century: expansion to the Achtörtige Eidgenossenschaft following the battles of Morgarten and Laupen:
  - Lucerne, city canton, since 1332
  - Zürich, city canton, since 1351
  - Glarus, rural canton, since 1352
  - Zug, city canton, since 1352
  - Bern, city canton, since 1353; associate since 1323
- 15th century: expansion to the Zehnörtige Eidgenossenschaft following the Burgundian Wars:
  - Fribourg, city canton, since 1481; associate since 1454
  - Solothurn, city canton, since 1481; associate since 1353
- 16th century: expansion to the Dreizehnörtige Eidgenossenschaft following the Swabian War:
  - Basel, city canton, since 1501
  - Schaffhausen, city canton, since 1501; associate since 1454
  - Appenzell, rural canton, since 1513; associate since 1411; later split into Appenzell Innerrhoden and Appenzell Ausserrhoden

=== Associates ===
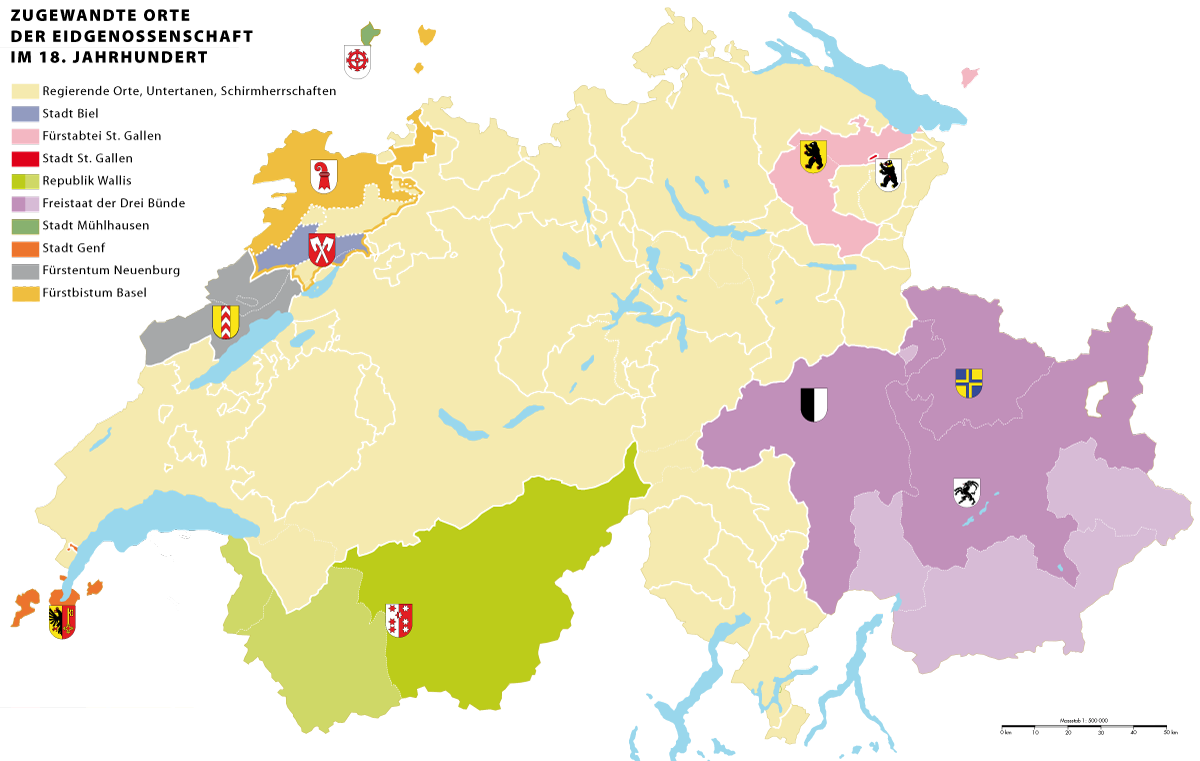
Associate states of the Old Swiss Confederacy in the 18th century

Associates (Zugewandte Orte) were close allies of the Old Swiss Confederacy, connected to the union by alliance treaties with all or some of the individual members of the confederacy.

==== Closest associates ====
Three of the associates were known as Engere Zugewandte (lit. 'tighter devoted'):

- Biel – 1344–1382 treaties with Fribourg, Bern and Solothurn. Nominally, Biel was subject to the Bishopric of Basel.
- Imperial Abbey of St. Gallen – 1451 treaty with Schwyz, Lucerne, Zürich and Glarus, renewed in 1479 and 1490. The abbey was simultaneously a protectorate.
- Imperial City of St. Gallen – 1454 treaty with Schwyz, Lucerne, Zürich, Glarus, Zug and Bern.

==== Eternal associates ====
Two federations were known as Ewige Mitverbündete (lit. 'eternally allied together'):

- Sieben Zenden, an independent federation in the Valais – Became a Zugewandter Ort in 1416 through an alliance with Uri, Unterwalden and Lucerne, followed by a treaty with Bern in 1446.
- Three Leagues were independent federations on the territory of the Grisons and became an associates of the Old Swiss Confederacy in 1497/98 through the events of the Swabian War. The Three Leagues together concluded an alliance pact with Bern in 1602.
  - Grey League, who had been allied with Glarus, Uri and Obwalden through pacts from 1400, 1407 and 1419, entered an alliance with seven of the old eight cantons (the Acht Orte without Bern) in 1497
  - League of God's House (Gotteshausbund) followed suit a year later.
  - League of the Ten Jurisdictions, the third of the leagues, entered an alliance with Zürich and Glarus in 1590.

==== Protestant associates ====
There were two Evangelische Zugewandte (lit. 'Protestant devoted'):

- Republic of Mulhouse – Concluded a first treaty with some cantons in 1466 and became an associate in 1515 through a treaty with all 13 members of the Confederacy, remaining so until events of the French Revolutionary Wars in 1798.
- Republic of Geneva – 1536 treaty with Bern and a 1584 treaty with Zürich and Bern, remaining so until events of the French Revolutionary Wars in 1798.

==== Other ====
- County of Neuchâtel – 1406 and 1526 treaties with Bern and Solothurn, 1495 treaty with Fribourg and 1501 treaty with Lucerne.
- Imperial Valley of Urseren – 1317 treaty with Uri; annexed by Uri in 1410.
- Weggis – 1332–1380 by treaties with Uri, Schwyz, Unterwalden and Lucerne; annexed by Lucerne in 1380.
- Murten – from 1353 by treaty with Bern; became a confederal condominium in 1475.
- Payerne – from 1353 by treaty with Bern; annexed by Bern in 1536.
- County of Sargans – from 1437 by treaty with Glarus and Schwyz; became a confederal condominium in 1483.
- Barony of Sax-Forstegg – from 1458 by treaty with Zürich; annexed by Zürich in 1615
- Stein am Rhein – from 1459 by treaty with Zürich and Schaffhausen; annexed by Zürich in 1484.
- County of Gruyère – had been allied with Fribourg and Berne since the early 14th century, becoming a full associate of the Confederation in 1548. When the counts fell bankrupt in 1555, the country was partitioned in twain:
  - Lower Gruyère – from 1475 by treaty with Fribourg
  - Upper Gruyère – from 1403 by treaty with Berne; annexed by Berne in 1555:
    - Imperial Valley of Saanen
    - Imperial Valley of Château-d'Œx
- County of Werdenberg – from 1493 by treaty with Lucerne; annexed by Glarus in 1517.
- Imperial City of Rottweil – from 1519 to 1632 through a treaty with all 13 members; a first treaty on military cooperation had already been concluded in 1463. In 1632, the treaty was renewed with Lucerne, Uri, Schwyz, Unterwalden, Zug, Solothurn and Fribourg.
- Bishopric of Basel – 1579–1735 by treaty with Lucerne, Uri, Schwyz, Unterwalden, Zug, Solothurn and Fribourg.

=== Condominiums ===
Condominiums (German: Gemeine Herrschaften) were common subject territories under the administration of several cantons. They were governed by reeves (Vögte) delegated for two years, each time from another of the responsible cantons. Bern initially did not participate in the administration of some of the eastern condominiums, as it had no part in their conquest and its interests were focused more on the western border. In 1712, Bern replaced the Catholic cantons in the administration of the Freie Ämter ('free districts'), the Thurgau, the Rhine valley, and Sargans, and furthermore the Catholic cantons were excluded from the administration of the County of Baden.

==== German bailiwicks ====
The "German bailiwicks" (German: Deutsche Gemeine Vogteien, Gemeine Herrschaften) were generally governed by the Acht Orte apart from Bern until 1712, when Bern joined the sovereign powers:

- Freie Ämter – conquered 1415 and partitioned in 1712:
  - Upper Freiamt was governed by the Acht Orte;
  - Lower Freiamt was governed by Zürich, Bern and Glarus alone.
- County of Baden – conquered 1415; from 1712 governed by Zürich, Bern and Glarus.
- County of Sargans – from 1460/83
- Landgraviate of Thurgau – from 1460
- Vogtei of Rheintal – from 1490, Acht Orte minus Bern, plus the Imperial Abbey of St Gall. Appenzell added in 1500; Bern added in 1712.

==== Lombard bailiwicks ====
Several bailiwicks (Vogteien) were generally referred to as 'transmontane bailiwicks' (German: Ennetbergische Vogteien, Italian: Baliaggi Ultramontani). In 1440, Uri conquered the Leventina Valley from the Visconti, dukes of Milan. Some of this territory had previously been annexed between 1403 and 1422. Further territories were acquired in 1500; see History of Ticino for further details.

Three bailiwicks, all now in the Ticino, were condominiums of the Forest cantons of Uri, Schwyz and Nidwalden:

- Vogtei of Blenio – 1477–80 and from 1495
- Vogtei of Rivera – 1403–22 and from 1495
- Vogtei of Bellinzona – from 1500

Four other Ticinese bailiwicks were condominiums of the Zwölf Orte (the original 13 cantons, minus Appenzell) from 1512:

- Landvogtei of Valmaggia
- Landvogtei of Lugano
- Landvogtei of Locarno
- Landvogtei of Mendrisio

Another three bailiwicks were condominiums of the Zwölf Orte from 1512, but were lost from the Confederacy three years later and are all now comuni of Lombardy or Piedmont:

- Travaglia
- Cuvio
- Eschental (now Ossola)

==== Two-party condominiums ====
===== Bern and Fribourg =====
- County of Grasburg / Schwarzenburg – from 1423
- Murten – from 1475
- Grandson – from 1475
- Orbe and Echallens – from 1475

===== Glarus and Schwyz =====
- Uznach – from 1437
- Windegg / Gaster – from 1438
- Hohensax / Gams – from 1497

===== Condominiums with third parties =====
- Lordship of Tessenberg – from 1388, condominium between Bern and Bishopric of Basel

=== Protectorates ===
- Bellelay Abbey – protectorate of Bern, Biel and Solothurn from 1414; nominally under the jurisdiction of the Bishopric of Basel
- Einsiedeln Abbey – protectorate of Schwyz from 1357
- Engelberg Abbey – protectorate of Lucerne, Uri, Schwyz and Unterwalden from 1425
- Erguel – protectorate of Biel/Bienne under military jurisdiction from 1335; also subject to the Bishopric of Basel
- Imperial Abbey of St. Gallen – protectorate of Schwyz, Lucerne, Zürich and Glarus from 1451; the abbey was simultaneously a Zugewandter Ort.
- Republic of Gersau, an independent village – allied with Schwyz since 1332; Lucerne, Uri and Unterwalden were also protecting powers.
- Moutier-Grandval Abbey – protectorate of Bern from 1486; the abbey was also subject to the Bishopric of Basel and, until 1797, the Holy Roman Empire
- La Neuveville – protectorate of Bern from 1388; also subject to the Bishopric of Basel.
- Pfäfers Abbey – protectorate of the Acht Orte minus Bern from 1460; annexed to the County of Sargans in 1483
- Rapperswil – protectorate of Uri, Schwyz, Unterwalden and Glarus from 1464; of Zürich, Bern and Glarus from 1712
- County of Toggenburg – protectorate of Schwyz and Glarus from 1436; of Zürich and Bern from 1718. The county was simultaneously subject to St Gallen Abbey.

=== Separate subjects ===
Some territories were separate subjects of cantons or associates, Einzelörtische Untertanen von Länderorten und Zugewandten (lit. 'Single-place subjects of states and devoted (allied) territories'):

==== Uri ====
- Valley of Leventina (1403, 1439, finally 1480)
- Valley of Urseren (1440)

==== Schwyz ====
- Küssnacht (1402)
- Einsiedeln Abbey (1397 / 1424)
- March (1405 / 36)
- Höfe (1440)

==== Glarus ====
- County of Werdenberg (1485 / 1517); annexed to Lucerne in 1485; to Glarus in 1517

==== Valais ====
- St-Maurice (1475 / 77)
- Monthey (1536)
- Nendaz-Hérémence (1475 / 77)
- Port Valais/Vionnaz
- Lötschental (15th century); the five upper Zenden

==== Three Leagues ====
- Bormio (1512–1797)
- Chiavenna (1512–1797)
- Valtellina (1512–1797)
- Drei Pleven (1512–26)
- Maienfeld (Bündner Herrschaft, 1509–1790); simultaneously a member of the League of the Ten Jurisdictions.
