= Charles Alavoine =

French surgeon (c. 1695–1764)

Charles Alavoine (c. 1695 – 8 July 1764) was a French surgeon who was active in the French territory of Canada and the following British Province of Quebec.

== Biography ==
Alavoine was born circa 1695 in France to Charles Alavoine, a merchant, and Marie-Thérèse Macard. His father settled in Montreal, where Alavoine would learn basic surgery. He married Marie-Anne Lefebvre (dit Laciseraye) on 27 April 1722, moving to Champlain, a place near Trois-Rivières, in May of the same year. Their first child was baptized 24 May 1723 in Champlain, their second 12 August 1724 in Montreal, and their third 4 November 1725 in Trois-Rivières, where they ultimately settled. He also bought land in La Prairie in August 1723, between his first and second child. Alavoine and Lefebvre had 16 more children.

Alavoine participated in church choir for 20 years. He requested that his family was given a free pew at church, which was declined, but his children only had to pay 4 livres in pew rent and were ensured that their pew would not be given away.

Beginning in 1730, Alavoine was deeply indebted, which he hid from Lefebvre. His house was seized and his father sued him for a 1,100 livre debt he had owed since 1729. Lefebvre left Alavoine and began harassing him in 1743. He died on 8 July 1764 and was buried in Trois-Rivieres the next day. At his death, his possessions were valued at 310 livres and 5 sols.

== Career ==
Alavoine became a surgeon at a hôtel-Dieu and surgeon-major for a military garrison, receiving a salary of 75 livres. Despite a petition from governor of New France Charles de la Boische, Marquis de Beauharnois, and intendant Gilles Hocquart to raise his salary to 300 livres, naval minister Jean Frédéric Phélypeaux, Count of Maurepas, only gave Alavoine a 200 livre salary. This forced him to have to rely on visitors to his office. He was the only surgeon in Trois-Rivières until François-Joseph Rembaud began a practice in 1748.

Alavoine was intended to be granted a warrant to become a royal surgeon in 1758, although he is believed to have never received it due to the Seven Years' War. The next year, he treated mother and daughter Marguerite Chastelain and Marie-Josephte Boucher de Niverville, victims of attempted murder, and revived the perpetrator, family servant Marie, who attempted to hang herself. The Dictionary of Canadian Biography described this treatment as "one of his finest achievements"; Marie was later executed by hanging.

After the British seized Canada, Alavoine contemplated returning to France, but he stayed in Canada due to petitions from the people and nuns of Trois-Rivières, being the only French doctor in the city, and believing that France would regain control. He did not receive a salary while under British control.
