= Anchor coinage =

Coins for British colonies in 1820/1822

The anchor coinage was a series of four denominations of silver coins issued for use in some British colonies in 1820 and 1822. The name comes from the crowned anchor that appears on the obverse of the coins. The denominations were sixteenth-, eighth-, quarter- and half-dollars, indicated by the Roman numerals XVI, VIII, IV and II on each side of the anchor. The reverse design was the royal coat of arms.

According to Krause & Mishler's Standard Catalog of World Coins, the coins were issued for use in Mauritius and other Indian Ocean colonies, then later circulated in the West Indies.

== See also ==
- Mauritian dollar
