= Netherlands Antillean guilder =

Former currency of the Netherlands Antilles

Antilliaanse gulden (Dutch); florin antiano (Papiamento)
Final series 10 guilder note, in circulation 2009
Final series 100 guilder note, in circulation 2009

ISO 4217
- Code: ANG

Unit
- Plural: guilders
- Symbol: NAƒ, NAf, ƒ or f

Denominations
- Subunit
- 1/100: cent
- Plural
- cent: cents
- Banknotes
- Freq. used: ƒ10, ƒ25, ƒ50, ƒ100
- Coins: 1, 5, 10, 25, 50 cent, ƒ1, ƒ2 1/2, ƒ5

Demographics
- Date of withdrawal: 30 June 2025
- Replaced by: Aruban florin; Caribbean guilder; United States dollar
- User(s): Curaçao and Sint Maarten until 30 June 2025 Netherlands Antilles until 10 October 2010 Caribbean Netherlands until 1 January 2011 Aruba until 1986

Issuance
- Central bank: Central Bank of Curaçao and Sint Maarten
- Website: www.centralbank.cw
- Printer: Joh. Enschedé
- Website: www.joh-enschede.nl
- Mint: Royal Dutch Mint
- Website: www.knm.nl

Valuation
- Inflation: 3.6%
- Source: Bank van de Nederlandse Antillen, 2006 Q1
- Method: CPI
- Pegged with: U.S. dollar = ƒ1.79
- This infobox shows the latest status before this currency was rendered obsolete.

The Netherlands Antillean guilder (Dutch: gulden; Papiamento: florin) was the currency of the Netherlands Antilles, and later of Curaçao and Sint Maarten, which until 2010 formed the Netherlands Antilles along with Bonaire, Saba, and Sint Eustatius. It was subdivided into 100 cents (Dutch plural: centen). The guilder was replaced on 1 January 2011 on the islands of Bonaire, Saba and Sint Eustatius by the United States dollar.

In Curaçao and Sint Maarten, a new currency, the Caribbean guilder, was proposed in November 2020. Originally planned for implementation in the first half of 2021, it had been stalled repeatedly by negotiations over the establishment of a separate central bank for Curaçao. The new guilder was eventually launched on 31 March 2025. The Netherlands Antillean guilders remained legal tender until 30 June 2025, then the currency was officially withdrawn.

== Naming ==
In Papiamentu, the local language of Aruba, Bonaire and Curaçao, the guilder was called a "florin". The first two letters of the currency's ISO 4217 code, ANG, was the ISO 3166-1 alpha-2 code assigned to the Netherlands Antilles, and the third letter, G, came from Gulden. NAFl, sometimes used as an abbreviation for the currency, was derived from Netherlands Antilles Florin.

== History ==
In the 18th century, the Dutch guilder circulated in the Netherlands Antilles. This was supplemented in 1794 by an issue of coins specific for the Dutch holdings in the West Indies. At this time, the guilder was subdivided into 20 stuiver.

Between 1799 and 1828, the reaal circulated on the islands, with 1 reaal = 6 stuiver or 3 1/3 reaal = 1 guilder. The Dutch guilder was reintroduced in 1828, subdivided into 100 cents. When currency began again to be issued specifically for use in the Netherlands Antilles, it was issued in the name of Curaçao, with the first banknotes and coins, denominated in the Dutch currency, introduced in 1892 and 1900, respectively. The name "Netherlands Antilles" (Nederlandse Antillen) was introduced in 1952.

In 1940, following the German occupation of the Netherlands, the link to the Dutch currency was broken, with a peg to the U.S. dollar of 1.88585 guilders = 1 dollar established. The peg was adjusted to 1.79 guilders = 1 dollar in 1971.

In 1986, Aruba gained a status aparte and left the Netherlands Antilles. Shortly after that, Aruba began to issue its own currency, the Aruban florin, which replaced the Netherlands Antillean guilder at par.

In 2011, over two months after the dissolution of the Netherlands Antilles, Bonaire, Saba and Sint Eustatius switched to the United States dollar and the Netherlands Antillean guilder ceased to be legal tender in those territories.

Curaçao and Sint Maarten intended to replace their currency, ceasing all production of the Antillean guilder. After delays, the old banknotes and coins now also required replacement, and only two years worth of Antilles guilder physical currency was remaining for use. In 2018 there was talk that the islands could opt for the euro or possibly the US dollar in lieu of implementing their own new currency.

In November 2019, Curaçao Finance Minister Kenneth Gijsbertha confirmed the introduction of the Caribbean guilder, and the Central Bank announced the same a year later.

By August 2021, it was reported that the new guilder was expected to launch in either 2023 or 2024. In September 2022, however, CBCS announced an introduction date of 2024. Then in July 2023, its release was postponed to 2025 at the latest. Indeed, the new guilder was introduced on 31 March 2025. After the introduction of the Caribbean guilder, the Netherlands Antillean guilder remained legal tender until 30 June 2025.

== Coins ==
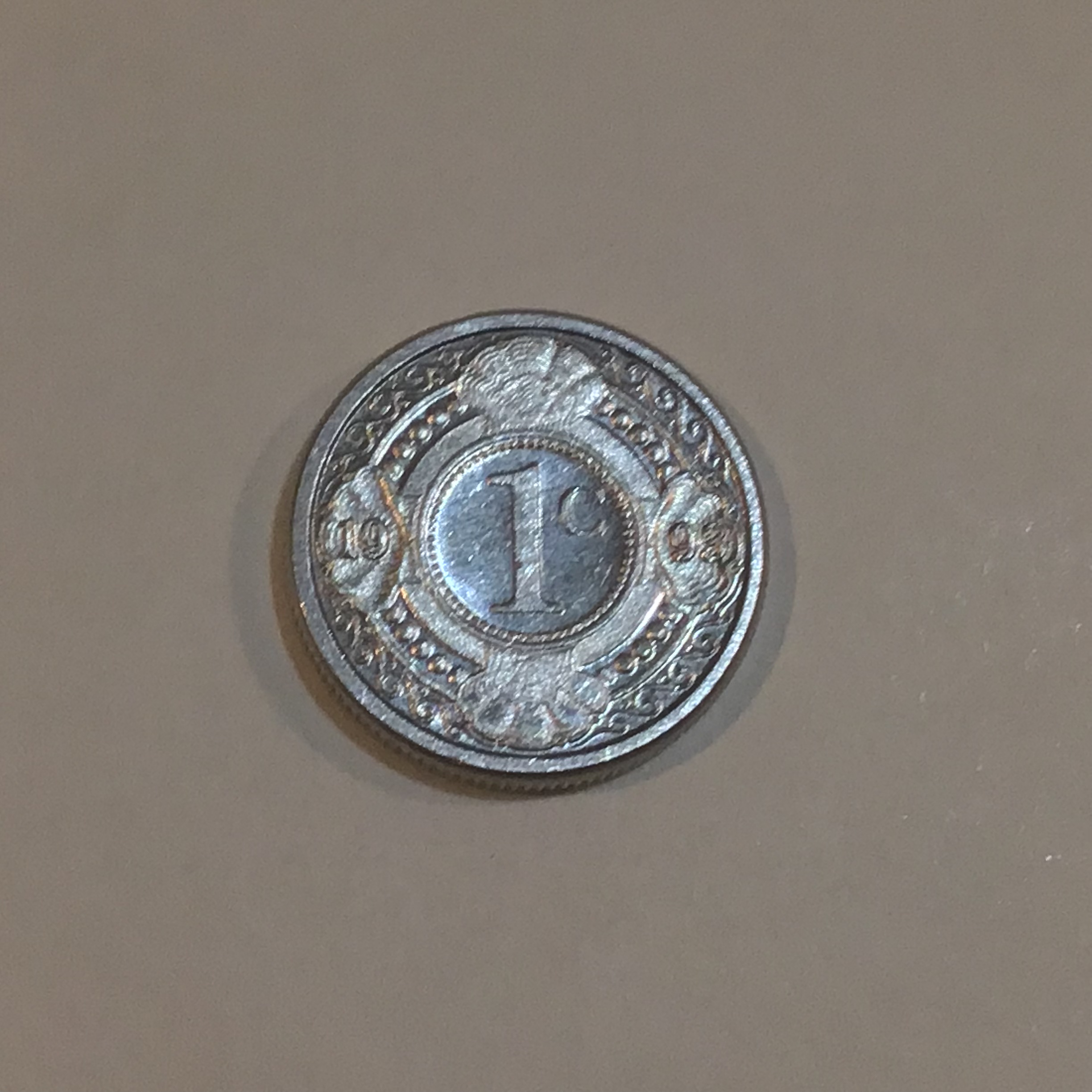
A one cent coin from 1998.

In 1794, silver coins were issued for use in the Dutch West Indies in denominations of 2 stuiver, 1/4, 1, and 3 guilders. The Dutch guilder was reintroduced in 1828, and some 1 guilder coins were cut into quarters and stamped with a "C" in 1838 to produce 1/4-guilder coins.

In 1900 and 1901, silver 1/10 and 1/4-guilder coins were introduced, which circulated alongside Dutch coins. Following the German occupation of the Netherlands and the separation of the Netherlands Antillean currency from the Dutch, a bronze 1-cent coin was introduced in 1942, followed by a cupro-nickel 5-cent coin in 1943. Bronze 2 1/2 cent and silver 1 and 2 1/2 guilders were introduced in 1944. The coinage of 1941–44 was minted in the United States and carried "P" or "D" mintmarks, and for most denominations a small palm tree. This money was also intended for use in Suriname. The alternate Dutch names for some of these coins are: 5 cent—stuiver; 10 cent—dubbeltje; 25 cent—kwartje; and 2 1/2 guilders—rijksdaalder.

From 1952, the name "Nederlandse Antillen" appeared on the coins. In 1970, nickel replaced silver, although the 2 1/2-guilder coin was not reintroduced until 1978. Aluminium 1 and 2 1/2 cents were introduced in 1979. In 1989, aluminium 1 and 5 cents, nickel-bonded-steel 10 and 25 cents, and aureate-steel 50 cents, 1 and 2 1/2 guilders were introduced. Aureate-steel 5-guilder coins followed in 1998.

The five-guilder coin was produced from aureate steel. The spots on the obverse are the result of corrosion, and are not a typical feature of the coin. Octagonal ridges were built into the face to help distinguish it from the similar one-guilder coin. The obverse featured Beatrix of the Netherlands, while the reverse had the coat of arms of the Netherlands Antilles.
The one-guilder coin was produced from aureate steel. The obverse featured Beatrix of the Netherlands, while the reverse has the coat of arms of the Netherlands Antilles.
The 50-cent coin was diamond-shaped. It was the only modern Antillean coin in this form, but an earlier version of the five-cent piece was also in this shape.

== Gallery of coins ==
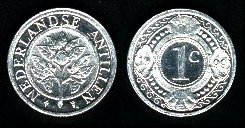
1 cent

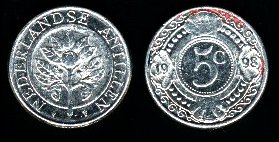
5 cent (stuiver)

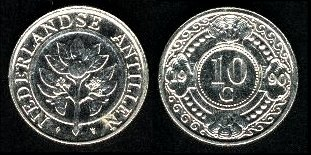
10 cent (dubbeltje)

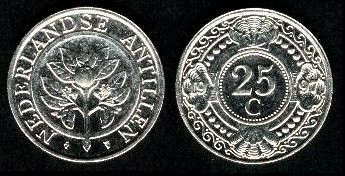
25 cent (kwartje)

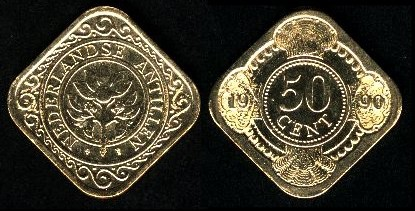
50 cent

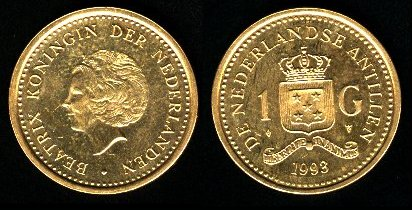
1 gulden

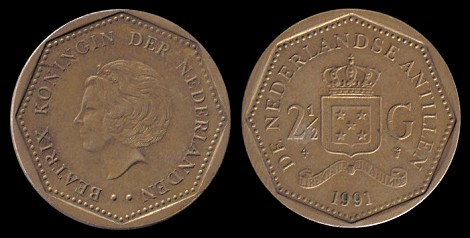
2½ gulden (rijksdaalder)

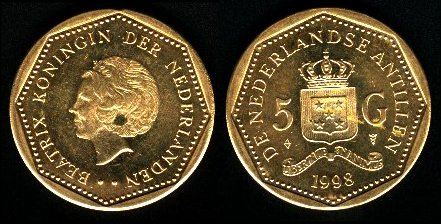
5 gulden

== Banknotes ==
In 1892, the Curaçaosche Bank introduced notes in denominations of 25 and 50 cents, 1 and 2 1/2 guilders. This was the only issue of the cent denominations. Notes for 5, 10, 25, 50, 100, 250 and 500 guilders followed in 1900. The 1 and 2 1/2 guilder notes were suspended after 1920 but reintroduced by the government in 1942 as muntbiljet.

From 1954, the name "Nederlandse Antillen" appeared on the reverse of the notes of the Curaçaosche Bank and, from 1955, the muntbiljet (2 1/2 guilders only) was issued in the name of the Nederlandse Antillen. In 1962, the bank's name was changed to the Bank van de Nederlandse Antillen. Starting in 1969, notes dated 28 AUGUSTUS 1967 began to be introduced. The front of these notes all featured the Statuut monument at front left instead of the allegorical seated woman found on the preceding issues, and on the back there was a new coat of arms. In 1970, a final issue of muntbiljet was made in denominations of both 1 and 2 1/2 guilders. The 500 guilder note was not issued after 1962. The 5 and the 250 guilder notes were not issued after 1998. The 5 guilder was replaced with a coin.

Image	Notes
	The 10 guilder note was illustrated with a hummingbird. Security features included a surface foil tag, an embedded hologram under the hummingbird, and an orange moiré pattern contrasting with the green note.
	The 25 guilder note was illustrated with a Caribbean flamingo. Security features included a surface foil tag, an embedded hologram under the flamingo, and a green moiré pattern contrasting with the pink note.
	The 50 guilder note had an rufous-collared sparrow on the face. Security features included a surface foil tag, an embedded hologram under the sparrow, and a green moiré pattern contrasting with the orange note.
	The 100 guilder note had a bananaquit on the face. Security features included a surface foil tag, an embedded hologram under the bananaquit, and a green moiré pattern contrasting with the brown note.

Current ANG exchange rates
From Google Finance:	AUD CAD CHF CNY EUR GBP HKD JPY USD EUR JPY USD
From Yahoo! Finance:	AUD CAD CHF CNY EUR GBP HKD JPY USD EUR JPY USD
From XE.com:	AUD CAD CHF CNY EUR GBP HKD JPY USD EUR JPY USD
From OANDA:	AUD CAD CHF CNY EUR GBP HKD JPY USD EUR JPY USD

== See also ==
- Economy of the Netherlands Antilles
