= Mauritian dollar =

Currency of Mauritius, 1820-1877

In 1820, in response to a request from the British colony of Mauritius, the imperial government in London struck silver coins in the denominations of 1/4, 1/8, and 1/16 dollars. The dollar unit in question was equivalent to the Spanish dollar and these fractional coins were known as 'Anchor Dollars' because of the anchor that appeared on them. More of these anchor dollars were struck in 1822 and not only for Mauritius but also for the British West Indies. In addition to this, a 1/2 dollar anchor coin was struck for Mauritius. A year or two later, copper dollar fractions were struck for Mauritius, the British West Indies, and Sierra Leone.

The dollar was the currency of Mauritius until 1877. Initially, it was made up of Spanish dollars, with paper money and new coins being issued in the 1820s (see Anchor coinage). The dollar was initially pegged at a value of 2 Indian rupees, then at 4 shillings sterling. In 1822, coins for 25 and 50 sous were issued due to the continued use of the French colonial livre.

The dollar circulated alongside sterling and the Indian rupee. An unofficial exchange rate of 2 rupees to the dollar was used, although this overvalued the rupee for a time.

In 1877, the Mauritian rupee was introduced. It replaced the dollar at a rate of 2 rupees = 1 dollar.
