= French colonial livre =

The livre was the currency of various French colonies until the early 19th century. It was subdivided into 20 sous, each of 12 deniers. It was mostly issued in paper money form and was generally linked to the French livre at the rate of 1 1/2 colonial livres = 1 French livre. Colonies where it was used include French Guiana, Guadeloupe (see Guadeloupe livre), Saint-Domingue (See: Haitian livre), Martinique, Mauritius, New France (see New France livre) and Réunion.
