= Liver (disambiguation) =

The liver is an organ in animals.

Liver may also refer to:

- Liver (album), a 1995 album by Steve Taylor
- Liver (Chinese medicine)
- Liver (color)
- Liver (food)
- Liver bird, the symbol of the city of Liverpool, England
- Liver Music, a collection of songs by the Residents
- Liver punch, a boxing move
- Liver spot, a blemish on the skin associated with aging and exposure to ultraviolet radiation from the sun
- Chopped liver, a liver pâté popular in Ashkenazic cuisine.

== See also ==
- Arno Liiver (1954–2026), Estonian actor
- Livre (disambiguation)
