= Nevisian dollar =

Currency of Nevis until 1830

The dollar was the currency of Nevis until 1830. The currency consisted of counterstamped Spanish and French colonial coins. The dollar was subdivided into 72 black dogs, each of 1½ pence. Around 1801, coins were issued for 1, 4, 6, 7 and 9 black dogs with the word "Nevis" and the denomination stamped on them. The 1 black dog coins were countermarked on French Guianan 2 sous, whilst the 9 black dogs were made from Spanish colonial 1 real coins. In 1830, sterling was established as the official currency of the island.

Since 1935, dollars have once more circulated on Nevis, first the British West Indies dollar, then the East Caribbean dollar.
