= Livre tournois =

Medieval French currency

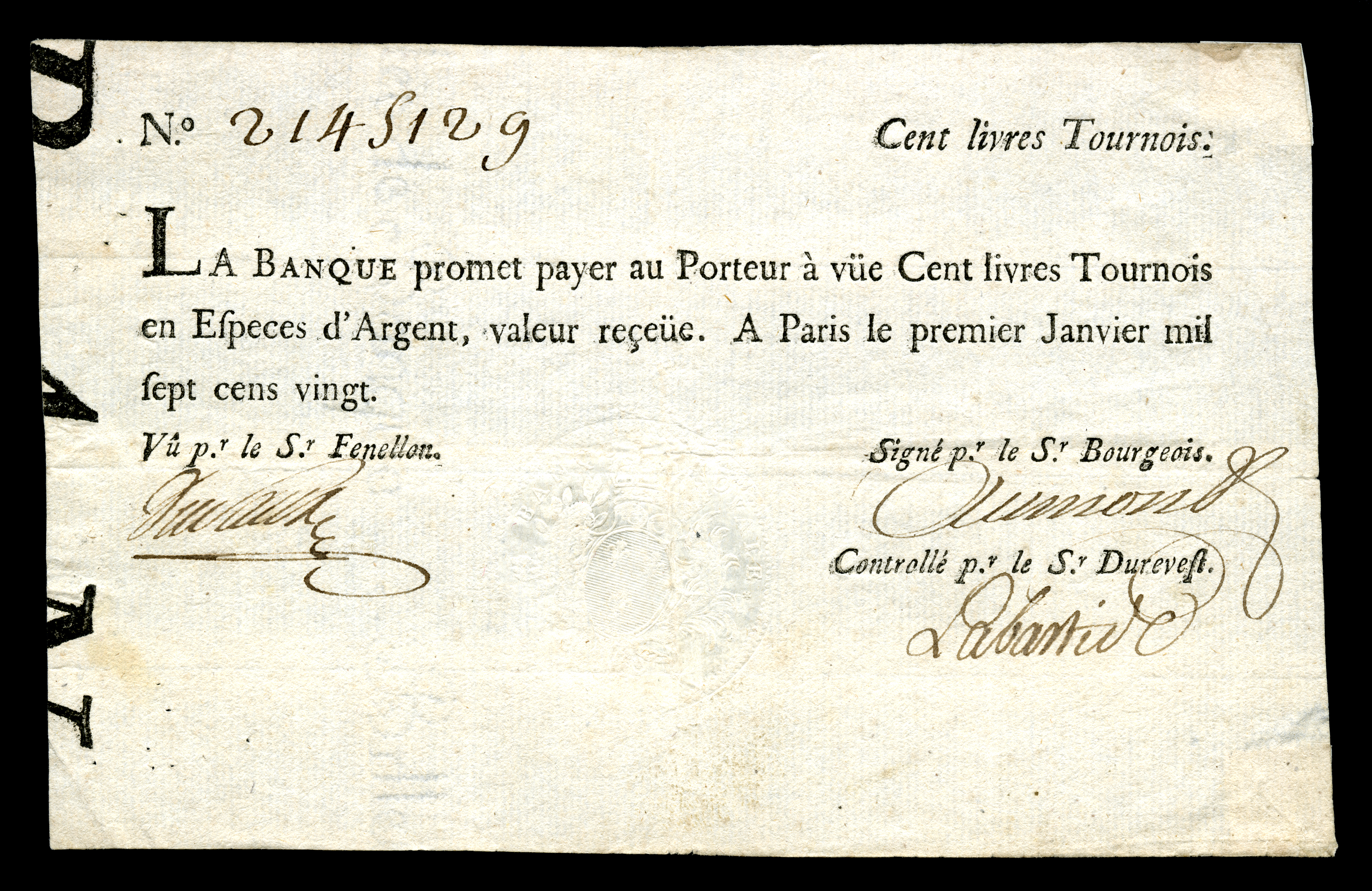
- La Banque Royale: 100 livres Tournois (1720)

Units of account
- Base unit: livre
- Symbol: ₶
- Subunit
- 1/20: sous sol until 1714
- 1/240: denier

Demographics
- User(s): France
- This infobox shows the latest status before this currency was rendered obsolete.

The livre tournois (French pronunciation: [livʁ tuʁnwa]; lit. 'Tours pound'; abbreviation: ₶ or £) was one of numerous currencies used in medieval France, and a unit of account (i.e., a monetary unit used in accounting) used in early modern France.

The 1262 monetary reform established the livre tournois as 20 sous tournois, or 80.88 grams of fine silver. The franc à cheval was a gold coin of one livre tournois minted in large numbers from 1360. In 1549, the livre tournois was decreed a unit of account, and in 1667 it officially replaced the livre parisis. In 1720, the livre tournois was redefined as 0.31 grams of pure gold, and in 1726, in a devaluation under Louis XV, as 4.50516 grams of fine silver. It was the basis of the revolutionary French franc of 1795, defined as 4.5 grams of fine silver exactly.

== Circulating currency ==
John II of France
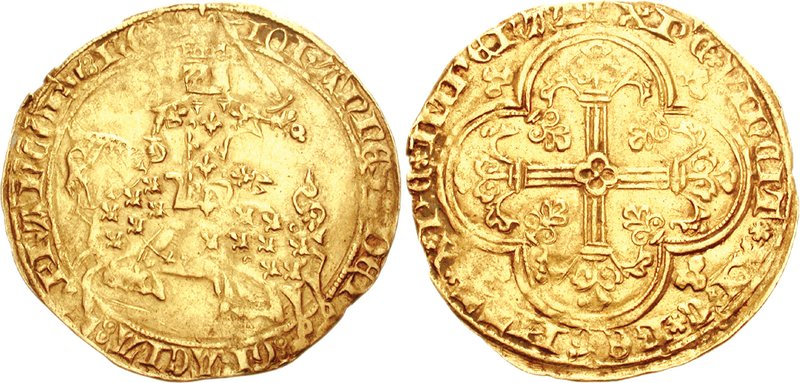
First side of the image: John, armored, on horseback left, holding sword. Around IOHANNES DEI GRATIA – FRANCORV REX
Second side of the image: Cross fleurée; lis in quarters; all within tressure; trefoils in angles; around + XP'C* VInCIT* XP'C* REGNAT* XP'C* INPERAT
Franc à cheval, 1360
Charles V of France
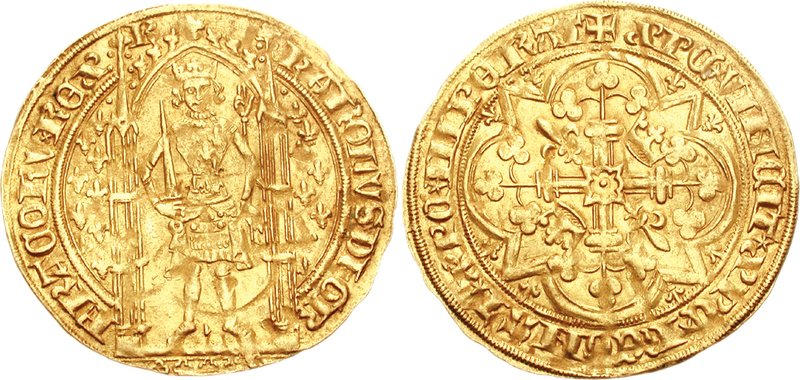
First side of the image: Charles standing facing, holding sword, in Gothic arch flanked by lis; KAROLVS x DI x GR FRANCOR x REX; there is an R at end of legend (La Rochelle mint)
Second side of the image: Ornate cross with trefoils at ends; lis and crowns in quarters; all within tressure; lis in angles. XPC* VINCIT x XRC REGNAT XRC* IMPERAT
Franc à pied

In France, the livre was worth 240 deniers (the "Tours penny"). These deniers were first minted by the abbey of Saint Martin, in the province of Touraine. Soon after Philip II of France seized the counties of Anjou and Touraine in 1203 and standardized the use of the livre tournois there, the livre tournois began to supersede the livre parisis (Paris pound) which had been up to that point the official currency of the Capetian dynasty.

The livre tournois was, in common with the original livre of Charlemagne, divided into 20 sols (sous after 1715), each of which was divided into 12 deniers.

Between 1360 and 1641, coins worth one livre tournois were minted, known as francs (the name coming from the inscription Johannes Dei Gratia Francorum Rex, [Jean, by the grace of God, King of the French]). Other francs were minted under Charles V, Henri III, and Henri IV. The use of the name "franc" became a synonym for livre tournois in accounting.

The first French paper money, issued between 1701 and 1720, was denominated in livre tournois (see "Standard Catalog of World Paper Money", Albert Pick). This was the last time the name was used officially, as later notes and coins were denominated simply in livres, the livre parisis having finally been abolished in 1667.

== Accounting currency ==
With many forms of domestic and international money (with different weights, purities and quality) circulating throughout Europe in the late Middle Ages and the early modern period, the use of an accounting currency became a financial necessity. In the world of international banking of the 13th century, it was the florin and ducat that were often used. In France, the livre tournois and the currency system based on it became a standard monetary unit of accounting and continued to be used even when the livre tournois ceased to exist as an actual coin. For example, the Louisiana Purchase treaty of 1803 specified the relative ratios of the franc, dollar, and livre tournois.

The official use of the livre tournois accounting unit in all contracts in France was legislated in 1549, but it had been one of the standard units of accounting in France since the 13th century. In 1577 the livre tournois accounting unit was officially abolished and accountants switched to the écu, which was at that time the major French gold coin in actual circulation, but in 1602 the livre tournois accounting unit was brought back. (A monetary unit of accounting based on the livre parisis continued to be used for minor uses in and around Paris and was not officially abolished until 1667 by Louis XIV.)

Since coins in Europe in the Middle Ages and the early modern period (the French écu, Louis d'or, teston d'argent, denier, double, franc; the Spanish doubloon, pistole, real; the Italian florin, ducat or sequin; the German and Austrian thaler; the Dutch gulden, etc.) did not have any indication of their value, their official value was determined by royal edicts. In cases of financial need, French kings could use the official value for currency devaluation. This could be done in two ways: (1) the amount of precious metal in a newly minted French coin could be reduced while nevertheless maintaining the old value in livre tournois or (2) the official value of a domestic or foreign coin in circulation could be increased. By reversing these techniques, currencies could be reinforced.

For example:

- The value of an écu d'or, a French gold coin, was changed from 60 to 57 sols in 1573.
- To curb increasing use of the Spanish real, its official value was decreased to 4 sols 2 deniers in the 1570s.

Royal finance officers faced many difficulties. In addition to currency speculation, forgery and the intentional shaving of precious metal from coins (which was harshly punished), they had the difficult problem of setting values for gold, silver, copper and billon coins, responding to the often large influx of foreign coin and the appearance of inferior foreign coins of intentionally similar design. For more on these issues, see Monetary policy and Gresham's law.

== Unicode symbol ==
₶o

livre tournois
- In Unicode: U+20B6 ₶ LIVRE TOURNOIS SIGN

A glyph for the livre tournois was added to Unicode 5.2, in the Currency Symbols block at code point U+20B6.

== See also ==
- French franc § History
- Louis d'or
- Luxembourgish livre
- Écu
- Roman currency
