= Togolese franc =

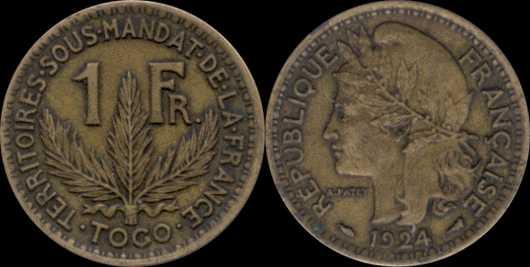
One Togolese Franc, 1924

The franc was the currency of Togo. Between 1924 and 1956, coins specifically for use in Togo were issued. Since 1945, Togo uses the West African CFA franc.

== History ==
Between 1884 and 1914, the German mark was the currency of Togo as Germany was the colonial power. In 1914, Togo was occupied by British and French forces. Togo was split into two League of Nations mandate territories, with the western, British portion adopting the British West African pound and eventually becoming part of Ghana. In the eastern, French territory, the French franc was adopted, supplemented in 1924 by coins issued in the name of the Mandate Territory of Togo. These coins were issued intermittently until 1956 and circulated alongside the CFA franc from 1945. No circulating coins specific to Togo have been issued since 1956, although the 1957 coins of French West Africa also bore the name Togo.

== Coins ==
In 1924, aluminium-bronze 50 centimes, 1 and 2 francs were introduced, with the franc denominations minted again in 1925 and the 50 centimes struck until 1926. In 1948, aluminium 1 and 2 francs coins were issued, followed by aluminium-bronze 5 francs in 1956.

== See also ==
- Economy of Togo
