= Orange Free State pound =

The Orange Free State pound was a currency in use prior to the end of the Second Boer War. Like the South African pound, it was divided into 20 Shillings or 240 Pence. It was withdrawn in 1902 and replaced by the Orange River Colony pound, which was in turn withdrawn in 1910 and replaced by the Orange Free State pound.

== See also ==
- Banknotes of the Orange Free State
- Postal Orders of the Orange Free State
