= Khwarazmi tenga =

Currency of Khwarazm

The tenga was a currency of Khwarazm (Khiva) issued until 1873 and between 1918 and 1924. It was subdivided into 10 falus. The tenga was replaced in 1873 by the Russian ruble and in 1924 by the Soviet ruble at a rate of 1 Soviet ruble = 5 Tenga.
