= Martinique franc =

Former Currency of Martinique (1855 - 1961)

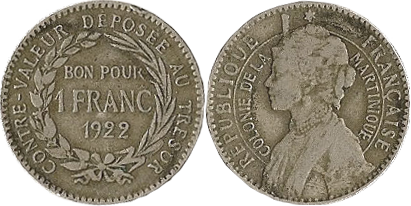
1 Martinique franc of 1922

The franc was the currency of Martinique until 2002. It was subdivided into 100 centimes. The French franc circulated, alongside banknotes issued specifically for Martinique between 1855 and 1961 and notes issued for Martinique, French Guiana and Guadeloupe (collectively referred to as the French Antilles) between 1961 and 1975.

== Coins ==
In 1897 and 1922, cupro-nickel 50 centimes and 1 franc coins were issued.

== Banknotes ==
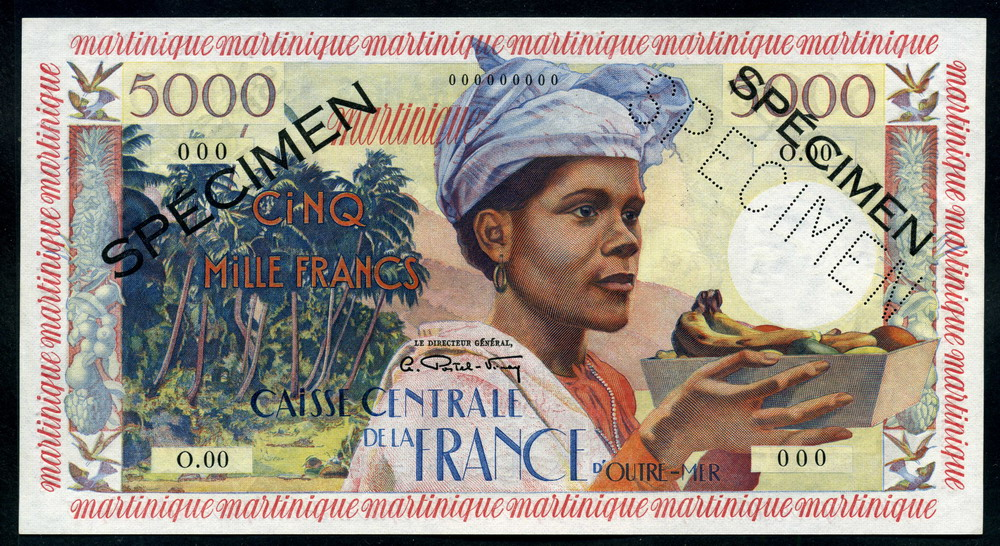
Martinique 5000 Francs banknote of 1960

In 1855, the Colonial Treasury introduced 1 and 5 francs Bons de Caisse, followed by 2 and 10 francs in 1884.

In 1874, the Banque de la Martinique introduced 5 francs notes, followed by 100 and 500 francs in 1905, 1 and 2 francs in 1915, and 25 francs in 1922. Between 1942 and 1945, a final series of notes was issued by the Banque de la Martinique in denominations of 5, 25, 100 and 1000 francs.

In 1944, the Caisse Centrale de la France Libre introduced 1000 francs notes. The same year, the Caisse Centrale de la France d'Outre-Mer introduced notes for 10, 20, 100 and 1000 francs. In 1947, a new series of notes was introduced in denominations of 5, 10, 20, 50, 100, 500, 1000 and 5000. These notes shared their designs with the notes issued for French Guiana and Guadeloupe.

In 1961, 100, 500, 1000 and 5000 francs notes were overstamped with their values in nouveaux francs (new francs): 1, 5, 10 and 50 nouveaux francs. The same year, a new series of notes was introduced with the names of Guadeloupe, French Guiana and Martinique on them. In 1963, the Institut d'Émission des Départements d'Outre-Mer took over paper money production in the three departments, issuing 10 and 50 nouveaux francs notes. These were followed in 1964 by notes for 5, 10, 50 and 100 francs, in which the word nouveaux having been dropped.

== See also ==
- French Guianan franc
- Guadeloupe franc
- Economy of Martinique
