= Sumatran dollar =

The dollar (Malay: ringgit, Jawi: ريڠݢيت) was the currency of British colony of Bencoolen (also known as Fort Marlbro' or Fort Marlborough; it is known as Bengkulu today) on the west coast of the island of Sumatra until the Anglo-Dutch Treaty of 1824, when the British Empire traded away Bencoolen for Malacca.

The dollar was subdivided into four suku (Malay, Jawi: ﺳوکو, English: quarter), each of 100 keping (Malay, Jawi: کڤڠ or کفڠ; English: pieces). The dollar was equal in value to the Spanish dollar. It was replaced by the Netherlands Indies gulden after the Dutch took over control of the colony from the British in 1824.

== Coins ==
Copper coins were issued in denominations of 1, 2 and 4 keping. Silver 2 suku pieces were issued in the name of Fort Marlbro in 1783 and 1784, followed by copper 1/2 dollar tokens in 1797.

Preceded by: Sumatran dudu	Currency of British colony of Bencoolen, Sumatra; 1794 – 1824	Succeeded by: Netherlands Indies gulden Reason: Anglo-Dutch Treaty of 1824
