= Curaçao reaal =

Currency of Curaçao until 1828

The reaal was the currency of Curaçao until 1828. It was subdivided into 6 stuiver, with 20 stuiver equal to the Dutch gulden.

== History ==
Between 1799 and 1815, 12 reaal were equal to a Spanish dollar (8 reales). From 1815 until 1828, 15 reaal were equal to a Spanish dollar. Many of the coins were produced from overstamped or cut Spanish or Spanish colonial coins. In 1828, the reaal was replaced by the Dutch gulden at the rate of 3 1/3 reaal = 1 gulden.

== Coins ==
In 1801, 9 stuiver (1 1/2 reaal) coins were issued, made by stamping "9" on Spanish colonial 1 real coins. In 1810, quarter cut 8 real coins were stamped with a five-petalled flower to produce 3 reaal coins. In 1815, fifth cut 8 real coins were also stamped with a five-petalled flower to produce smaller 3 reaal coins.

In 1818, fifth and third cut 8 real coins were stamped with "3" and "5", respectively to produce 3 and 5 reaal coins. Issue of the 3 reaal coins continued until 1825. In 1821, silver 1 reaal coins were struck, followed by 1 stuiver coins in 1822. After the introduction of the Dutch currency, the 1 stuiver coins were again struck in 1840 and 1841 (without changing the date) and circulated as 2 cent coins.

== See also ==
- Economy of the Netherlands Antilles
