= Guadeloupe franc =

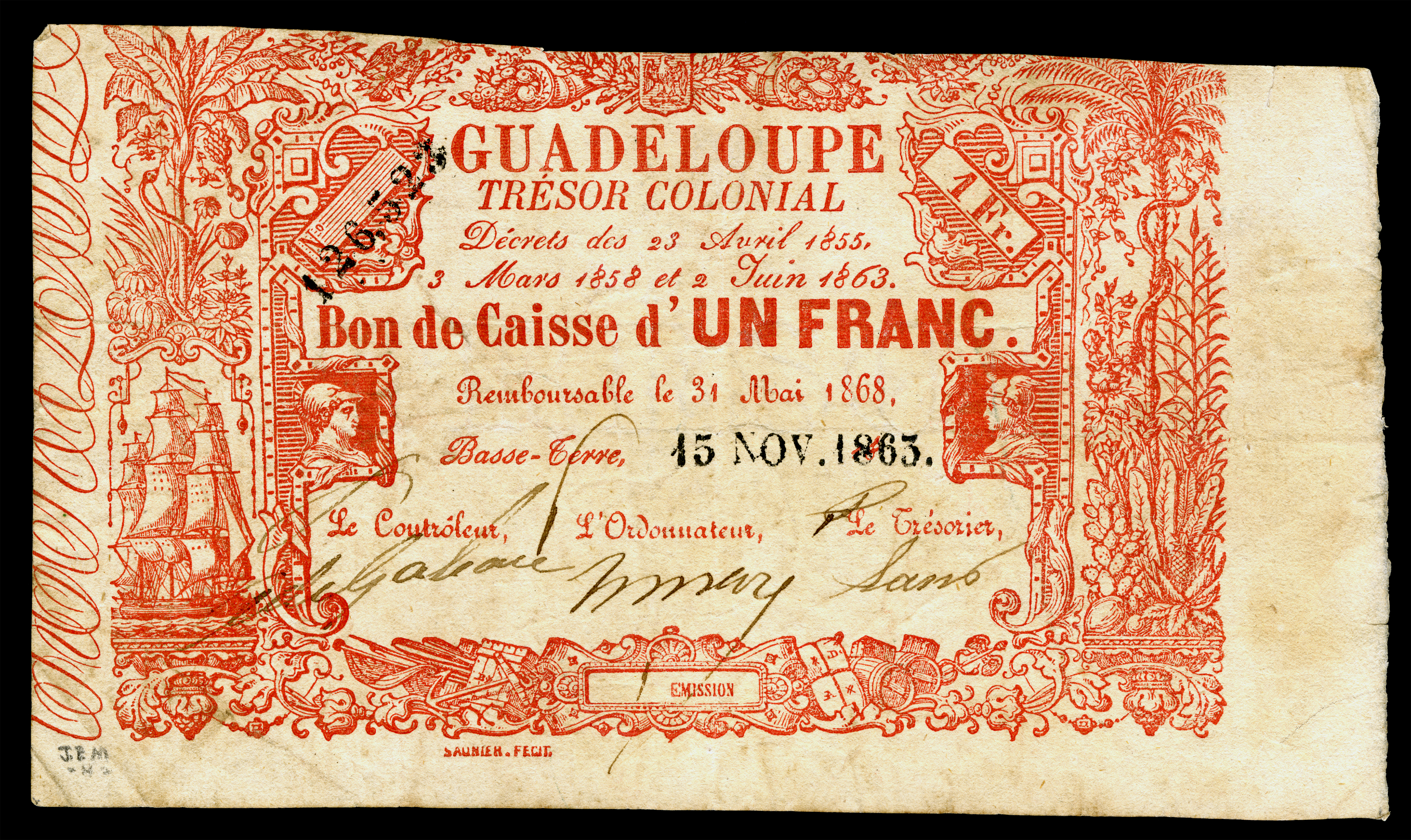
Guadaloupe Tresor Colonial Bons de Caisse, one franc (1863)

The franc was the currency of Guadeloupe until 2002. It was subdivided into 100 centimes.

== History ==
The franc was introduced following France's recovery of the Islands from the U.K. in 1816. It replaced the livre. The French franc circulated, alongside banknotes issued specifically for French Guiana between 1848 and 1961 and notes issued for Guadeloupe, French Guiana and Martinique (collectively referred to as the French Antilles) between 1961 and 1975.

== Coins ==
In 1903 and 1921, cupro-nickel 50 centimes and 1 franc coins were issued.

== Banknotes ==
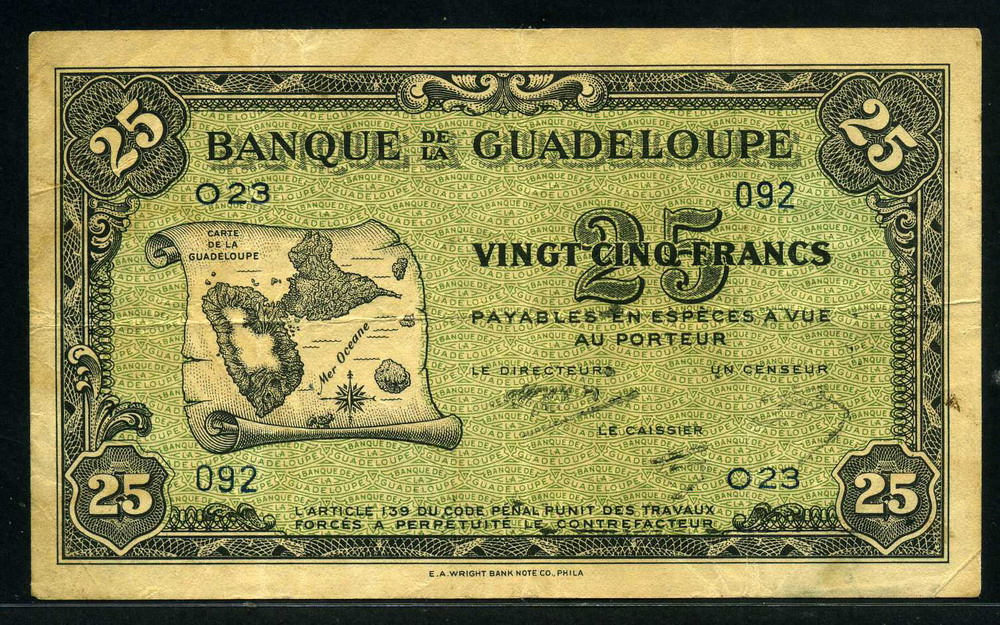
Guadeloupe 25 Francs banknote of 1942

In 1848, the Banque de Pret introduced notes in denominations of 5, 10, 50, 100, 500, and 1000 francs. The Colonial Treasury issued 1 franc Bons de Caisse from 1854, followed by 2 francs in 1864 and 50 centimes, 5 and 10 francs in 1884.

In 1887, the Banque de la Guadeloupe introduced 500 francs notes, followed by 50 centimes, 1, 2, 25, and 100 francs in 1920 and 5 francs in 1928. A final series of notes was introduced by the Banque de la Guadeloupe in 1942, in denominations of 5, 25, 100, 500, and 1000 francs.

In 1944, the Caisse Centrale de la France d'Outre-Mer introduced notes for 10, 20, 100 and 1000 francs. In 1947, a new series of notes was introduced in denominations of 5, 10, 20, 50, 100, 500, 1000, and 5000. These notes shared their designs with the notes issued for French Guiana and Martinique.

In 1961, 100, 500, 1000, and 5000 francs notes were overstamped with their values in nouveaux francs (new francs): 1, 5, 10, and 50 nouveax francs. The same year, a new series of notes was introduced with the names of Guadeloupe, French Guiana and Martinique on them. In 1963, the Institut d'Emission des Départements d'Outre-Mer (Institute for Emissions in the Overseas Departments) took over paper money production in the three departments, issuing 10 and 50 nouveax francs notes. These were followed in 1964 by notes for 5, 10, 50 and 100 francs, the word nouveaux having been dropped.

== See also ==
- French Guianan franc
- Martinique franc
- Economy of Guadeloupe
