= Economy of the Netherlands Antilles =

The Netherlands Antilles was an autonomous Caribbean country within the Kingdom of the Netherlands, which was formally dissolved in 2010.

== Overview ==
Tourism, petroleum transshipment, and offshore finance were the mainstays of the economy, which was closely tied to the outside world. The islands enjoyed a high per capita income and a well-developed infrastructure as compared with other countries in the region at the time of the dissolution. Almost all consumer and capital goods were imported, with Venezuela, the United States, and Mexico being the major suppliers. Poor soils and inadequate water supplies hampered the development of agriculture.

== Statistics ==
Gross Domestic product- $3.81 billion GDP: purchasing power parity - $3 600 million (3,6 G$) (2007 est.)

GDP - real growth rate: 4,0% (2007 est.)

GDP - per capita: purchasing power parity - $19 000 (2007 est.)

GDP - composition by sector:
agriculture: 1%
industry: 15%
services: 84% (2007 est.)

Population below poverty line: NA%

Household income or consumption by percentage share:
lowest 10%: ± 1,5%
highest 10%: ± 31%

Inflation rate (consumer prices): 3,0% (2007)

Labour force: 83 600 (2005)

Labour force - by occupation: agriculture 1%, industry 20%, services 79% (2007 est.)

Unemployment rate: 9% (2007 est.)

Budget:
revenues: $757,9 million
expenditures: $949,5 million, including capital expenditures of $NA (2004 est.)

== Composition of the Economy ==
Industries: tourism (Curaçao, Sint Maarten, and Bonaire), petroleum refining (Curaçao), petroleum transhipment facilities (Curaçao and Bonaire), light manufacturing (Curaçao)

Industrial production growth rate: NA%

Electricity - production: 1 005 GWh (2004)

Electricity - production by source:
fossil fuel: 100%
hydro: 0%
nuclear: 0%
other: 0% (1998)

Electricity - consumption: 934,7 GWh (2004)

Electricity - exports: 0 kWh (2004)

Electricity - imports: 0 kWh (2004)

Agriculture - products: aloes, sorghum, peanuts, vegetables, tropical fruit

== Exports and Imports ==
Exports: $2.076 million (f.o.b., 2004)

Exports - commodities: petroleum products

Exports - partners: US 32%, Panama 10.1%, Guatemala 7,9%, Haiti 6,4%, The Bahamas 5,1% (2005)

Imports: $4.383 billion (c.i.f., 2004)

Imports - commodities: crude petroleum, food, manufactures

Imports - partners: Venezuela 50%, US 22,2%, Italy 5.2%, Netherlands 5% (2005)

== Foreign Debt and Economic Aid ==
Its external debt was $2 680 million (2004). The IMF provided $61 million in 2000, and the Netherlands continued its support with $40 million (2004)

== Currency ==
Its currency was 1 Netherlands Antillean guilder, gulden, or florin (NAf.) = 100 cents Its exchange rate was Netherlands Antillean guilders, gulden, or florins (NAf.) per US$1 – 1.790 (fixed rate since 1989).

== Fiscal Year ==
Fiscal year: calendar year

== See also ==
- Economy of the Caribbean
- Central banks and currencies of the Caribbean
- List of Latin American and Caribbean countries by GDP (nominal)
- List of Latin American and Caribbean countries by GDP (PPP)
