= Malvinas Islands peso =

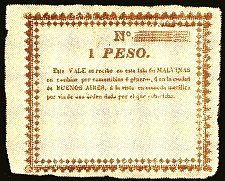
One Peso Note

The peso was a promissory note which was issued on the Falklands Islands (Spanish: Islas Malvinas) by Luis Vernet from around 1828 until the islands were invaded by the British in August 1833. Vernet, who was appointed Governor by the United Provinces of Rio de la Plata in 1829, paid workers on the islands in these promissory notes.

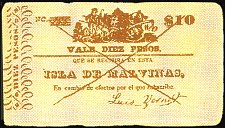
Ten Peso Note

Following the Lexington raid in 1831, the settlement was in some disarray. When Vernet's deputy, Matthew Brisbane, returned in March 1833, he devalued these promissory notes as a reflection of Vernet's reduced status. This combined with the attempted re-assertion of authority after months of anarchy following the Lexington raid led a gang of Creole and Indian gauchos to run amok in the settlement killing the five senior members of Vernet's settlement, including Brisbane.

So many of these notes were issued that they continued in use as a currency long after the British return in 1833. So much was still circulating 10 years later, even in the Government treasury, that Governor Moody issued hand written notes in exchange.

== Banknotes ==
Paper money was issued in denominations of 1, 2, 5 and 10 pesos. The notes were uniface and printed in black ink.

== See also ==
- Falkland Islands pound
