= Neuchâtel gulden =

The gulden a currency denomination of Neuchâtel equal to 21 batz until 1850. Neuchâtel's basic currency unit was the livre (later franc), divided into 10 batz or 40 kreuzer. The French silver écu was worth 42 batz or 2 gulden. It was replaced by the Swiss franc.

== Coins ==
In the late 18th century, billon 1/2 and 1 creuzer and 1/2 and 1 batz were issued, together with silver 1/3, 1/2, 2/3 and 1 gulden. The 1/3 and 2/3 gulden were denominated as 28 and 56 creuzer, whilst the 1/2 and 1 gulden were denominated as 10 1/2 and 21 batz. After 1799, only the billon coins were issued, with the last coins struck in 1818.
