= Geneva genevoise =

The genevoise was the short-lived currency of Geneva between 1794 and 1795. It was subdivided into 10 decimes (singular: decimi). The genevoise replaced and was replaced by the thaler.

== Coins ==
In 1794, silver coins were issued in denominations of ½ and 1 decimal and 1 genevoise.
