= Valais thaler =

Valaisian coin

The Valais thaler was a coin equivalent to the French silver écu issued by the Swiss canton of Valais until 1798. It contained 26.67 g fine silver and was valued at 4 livres.

The currency of Valais was the livre (later franc or frank), divided into 10 batzen or 40 kreuzer.

The laubthaler or écu was also equivalent to 4 Franken of the Helvetic Republic in 1798.

In the late 18th century, bullion coins were issued in denominations of 1, 2, 4, 6 and 12 creuzer, with the 2 and 4 creuzer denominated as 1/2 and 1 batz. Silver 20 creuzer were also issued
