= Geneva thaler =

The Geneva thaler was a coin equivalent to the French silver écu, containing 26.67 g fine silver and valued at 12 3/4 florins, which was issued by Geneva until 1798 (except briefly between 1794 and 1795) and between 1813 and 1839.

== History ==
The currencies used in Geneva were the florin, petite monnaie (each of 12 sols or 144 deniers, petite monnaie) and the livre courant worth 3 1/2 florins (each of 20 sols or 240 deniers, courant). The florin & livre were the currencies of the Republic of Geneva except in 1794–95, when the genevoise was used, and in 1798–1813, when Geneva was annexed by France and the French franc was used. The florin & livre were replaced in 1839 by the Geneva franc, and after 1848 by the Swiss franc.

== Coins ==
In the late 18th century, billon coins were issued in denominations of 6 and 9 deniers, 1, 1 1/2, 3 and 6 sols, together with silver 15 sols, 1/2 and 1 thaler and gold 1 and 3 pistole. The 1/2 thaler were coined as "VI FLORINS IV^{S} VI^{D}", whilst the 1 thaler were coined "XII FLORINS IX SOLS".
