= Luxembourg livre =

Currency of Luxembourg until 1795

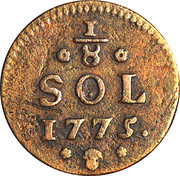
Reverse Side of a 1/8 Luxembourgish Sol

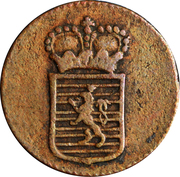
Obverse Side of a 1/8 Luxembourgish Sol

The livre was the currency of Luxembourg until 1795. It was subdivided into 20 sols, each of 4 liards. In the late 18th century, coins were issued in denominations of ½ and 2 liards, 1, 3, 6, 12 and 72 sols, with the lower three denominations in copper, the highest minted in silver and the others in billon. The last issues of 1795 were 1 sol coins minted during the siege of Luxembourg.
