= Guadeloupe livre =

The livre was the currency of Guadeloupe until 1816. It was subdivided into 20 sous, each of 12 deniers, with the escalin worth 15 sous. The Guadeloupe livre was a French colonial currency, distinguished by the use, in part, of Spanish coins.

== History ==
Initially, the French livre circulated. This was supplemented by overstamped and cut coins in the late 18th and early 19th centuries, especially between 1811 and 1816 when Guadeloupe was occupied by Britain. The French franc replaced the livre after French control was re-established, with the Guadeloupe franc issued from 1848.

== Coins ==
In 1793, French 12 deniers coins were overstamped with the letters "RF" and circulated for 3 sous 9 deniers (1/4 escalin). In 1802, 1 and 4 escalins coins were produced by cutting Spanish dollars into a central, octagonal part for the 4 escalins coins and eight outer sections for the 1 escalin coins. Both were stamped with "RF" and the 4 escalins were also stamped "4E".

In 1811, a number of different denominations were issued, all of which were stamped with a crowned letter "G". 10 sous coins were produced from Spanish and Spanish colonial 1/2 real, British 3 pence and French 1/20 écu. 20 sous coins were produced from 1 real, 12 sous and 6 pence coins, and central plugs cut from Spanish dollars. 40 sous coins were produced from 1/3 écu, 24 sous and 1 shilling coins. 9 livres coins were produced from Spanish dollars from which a central plug (used to make 20 sous coins) had been cut. Brazilian 6,400 réis were overstamped with the crowned "G" and "82.10" to produce 82 livres 10 sous coins. In 1813, 2 livres 5 sous coins were produced from quarter segments of Spanish dollars.

== See also ==
- Holey dollar
- Economy of Guadeloupe
