= Haitian livre =

Currency formerly used in Haiti

The livre was the currency of Haiti until 1813. The Haitian livre was a French colonial currency, distinguished by the use, in part, of Spanish coins. It was equal to the French livre and was subdivided into 20 sous, each of 12 deniers. The escalin of 15 sous was also used as a denomination, since it was equal to the Spanish colonial real. Coins specifically for use in Haiti were issued between 1802 and 1809, along with various overstamped coins.

The livre was replaced by the Haitian gourde in 1813 with the decimalization of its monetary system, at a rate of 1 gourde = 8 livre 5 sous (11 escalin).

== See also ==
- Haitian gourde
- Piastre
- Economy of Haiti
