= New France livre =

Currency used in New France

The livre was the currency of New France, the French colony in modern-day Canada. It was subdivided into 20 sols, each of 12 deniers. The New France livre was a French colonial currency, distinguished by the use of paper money.

== History ==
After an initial period during which barter prevailed, the French livre began to circulate. In order to encourage coins into the colony, those circulating in New France were valued at a premium, creating a monnoye de pays (French monnaie de pays in Modern French) worth less than the French currency (monnoye de France, monnaie de France in Modern French). The premium was set at one-eighth in 1664, raised to one-third in 1680. The New France currency was distinguished by the extensive use of paper money. However, early issues did not maintain their value. In 1717, the premium for coins was abolished, the card money was redeemed at half its face value and the New France livre was set equal to the French livre. Further paper money was issued. In the 1750s, the backing of paper money by coins was discontinued, causing the hoarding of coins. Following the British conquest of New France, the paper money lost its value and the livre was replaced by the pound.

== Coins ==
A variety of coins circulated in New France, including Spanish dollars, Spanish reales and Spanish colonial reales. In 1670, silver 5 and 15 sols were introduced for use in New France. In 1709, billon 30-denier coins were issued in the colony, followed by billon 15 deniers in 1711. Copper 9 deniers followed in 1722. In 1738, billon 1- and 2-sol coins were introduced in France which also circulated in New France. These coins were also known as 1/2 and 1 sols marqués.

== Banknotes ==
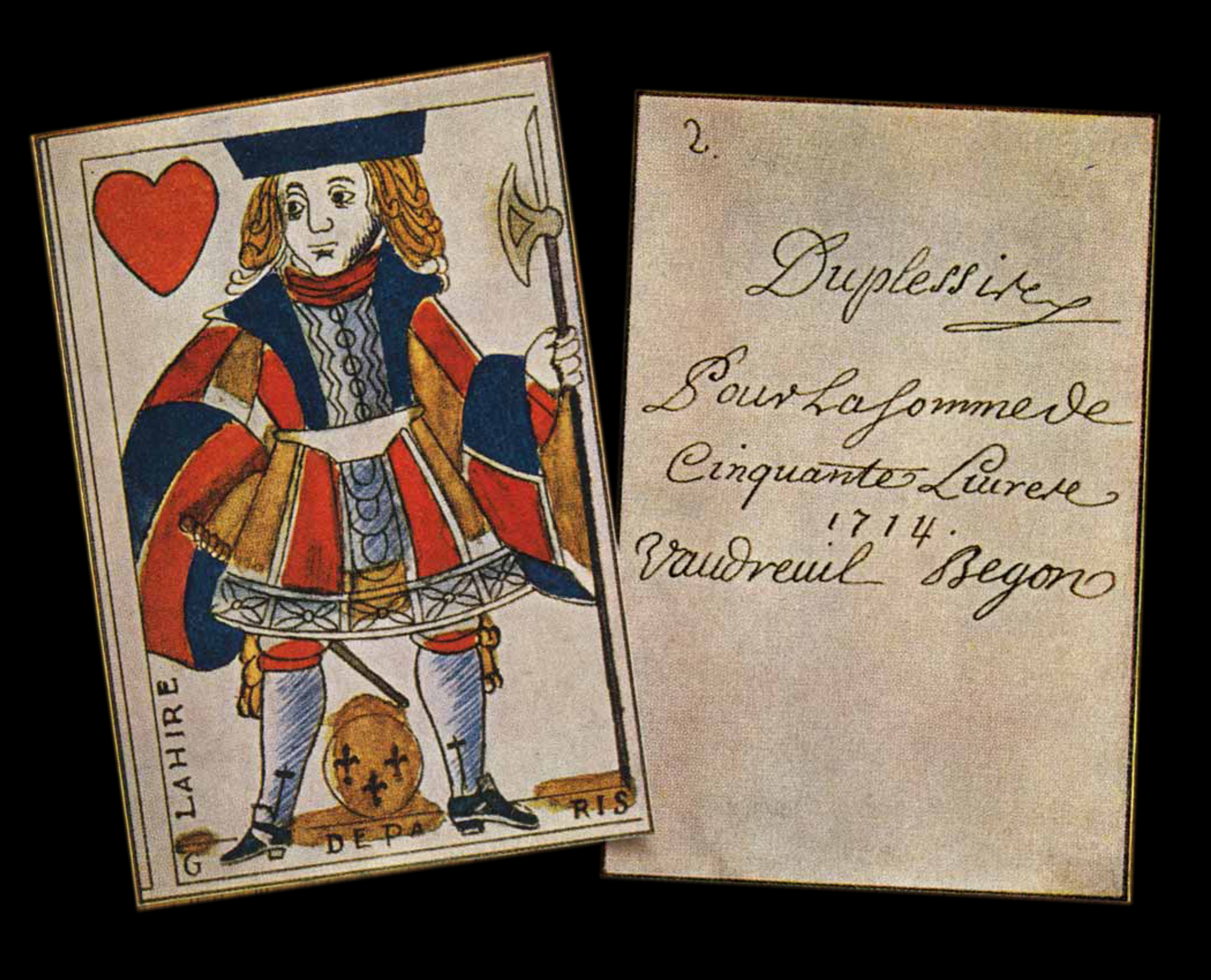
A 1714 playing card had the same currency value in the colony of New France as minted currency.

In 1685, "card money" was introduced. These were simple notes, hand written on the back of playing cards, which were used due to a shortage of coins. The first issue was redeemed after 3 months. Despite the French authorities' displeasure, further issues were made into the 1690s. Inflation reduced the card money's value, until it was redeemed at half face value in 1717.

In the 1720s, the government introduced promissory notes, known as ordonances. Card money was reintroduced in 1729. Denominations of 6, 12 and 24 livres were issued in 1729, followed by 30 sols in 1733, 20 sols in 1734, 3 livres in 1742, and 7 1/2 and 15 sols in 1749. In 1753, treasury notes were introduced (also known as ordonances). 48-livre notes were introduced in 1753, followed by 20 sols in 1754, 3 and 24 livres in 1756, 12 and 96 livres in 1757, and 6 livres in 1758.
