= Shilling =

Name for a coin or unit of currency

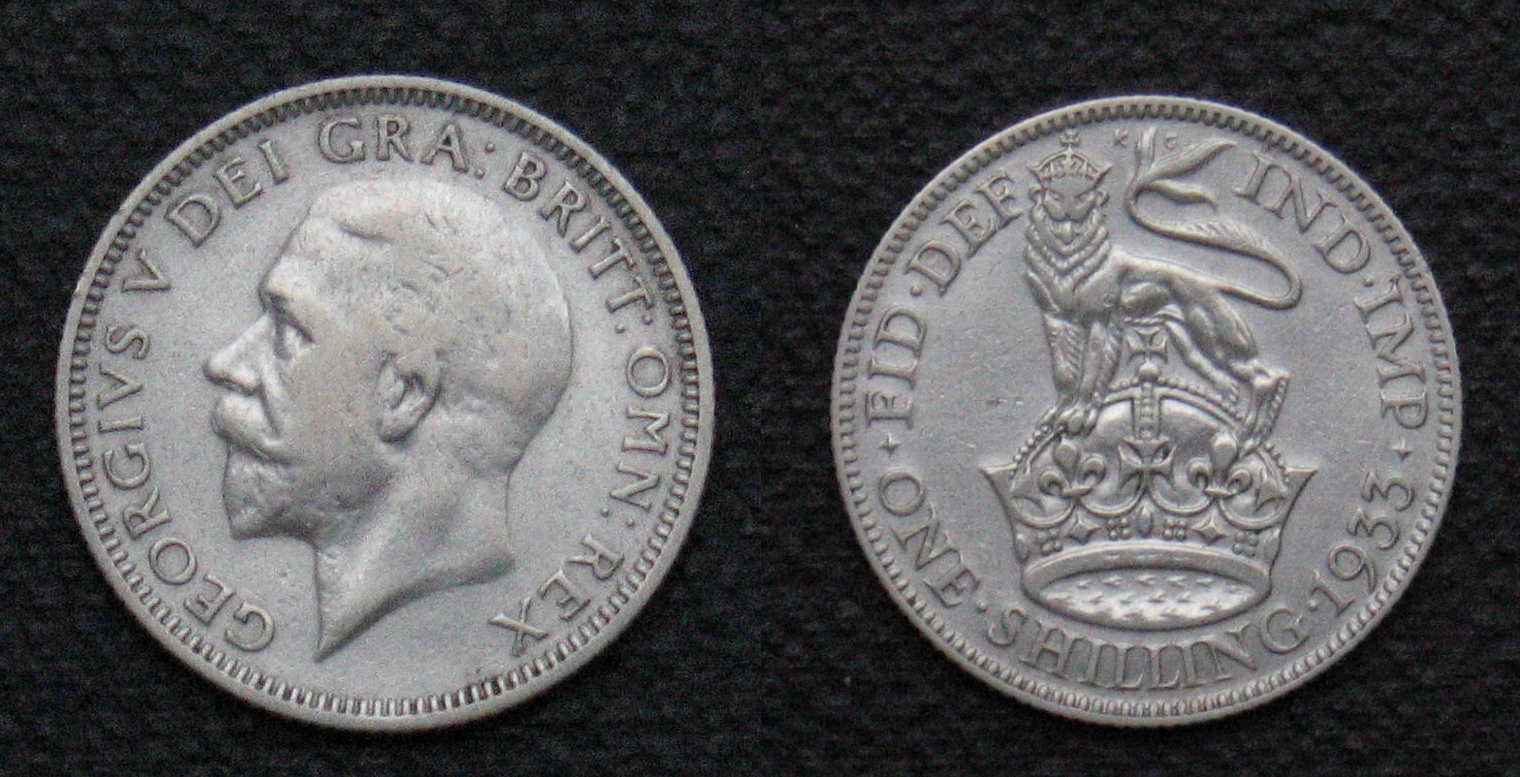
A 1933 UK shilling

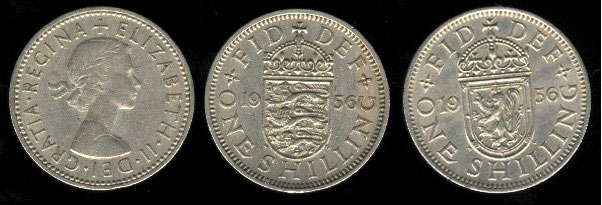
1956 Elizabeth II UK shilling showing English and Scottish reverses

The shilling is a historical coin and the name of a unit of modern currencies formerly used in the United Kingdom, Australia, New Zealand, other British Commonwealth countries and Ireland. It was generally equivalent to 12 pence, one-twentieth of a pound (worth 240 pence before decimalization), and was largely phased out during the 1960s and 1970s.

As of 2026, five East African countries have a shilling as their unit of account. These are the Kenyan shilling, the Tanzanian shilling, the Ugandan shilling, the Somali shilling and the (de facto) Somaliland shilling. Looking forward, the East African Community plans to introduce a common currency, the East African shilling.

== History ==
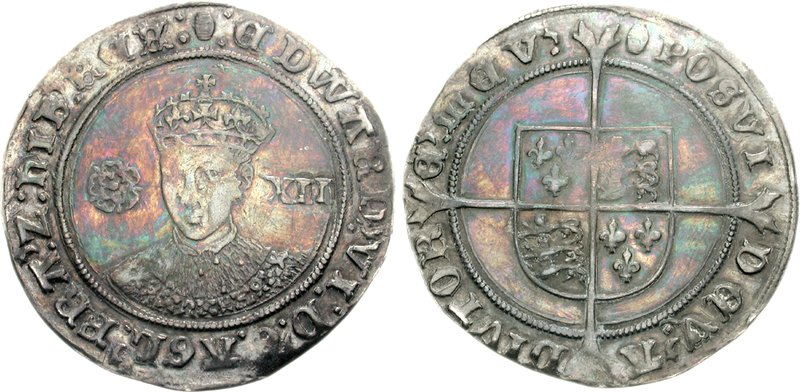
English shilling minted under Edward VI, c. 1551

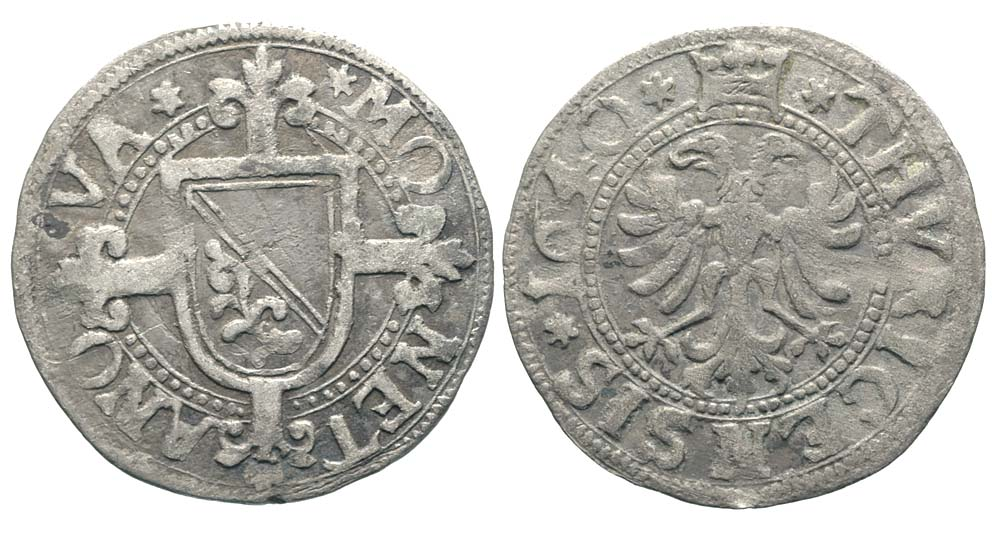
Schilling coin of the imperial city of Zürich, minted in billon, 1640

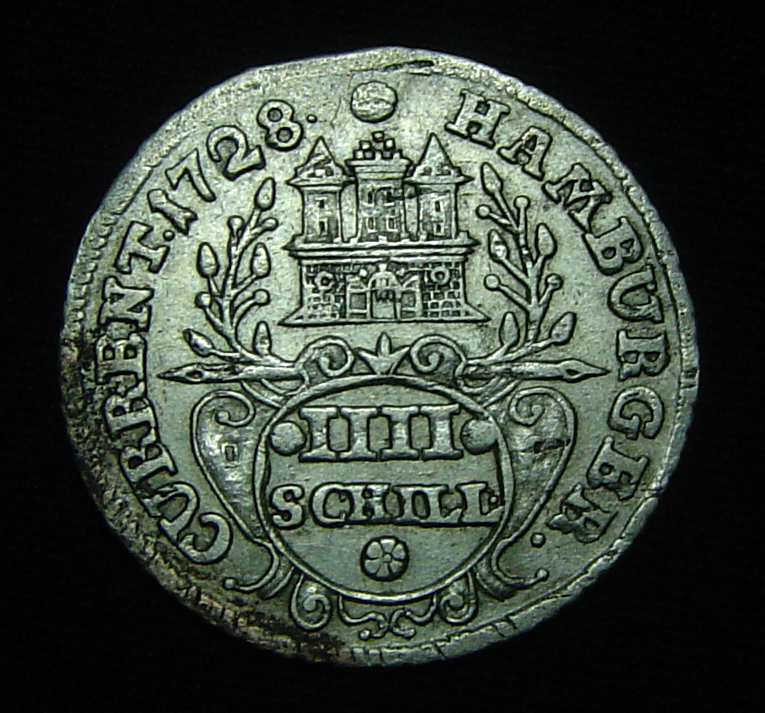
Silver 4 schilling coin, Hamburg, 1728

The word shilling comes from the Anglo-Saxon word scilling, a monetary term meaning literally "twentieth of a pound", from the Proto-Germanic root skiljaną meaning literally "to separate, split, divide", from (s)kelH- meaning "to cut, split." The word "Scilling" is mentioned in the earliest recorded Germanic law codes, the Law of Æthelberht (c. 600).

In origin, the word schilling designated the solidus of late antiquity, the gold coin that replaced the aureus in the 4th century. The Anglo-Saxon scillingas of the 7th century were still small gold coins.

In 796, Charlemagne passed a monetary reform, based on the Carolingian silver pound (about 406.5 grams). The schilling was one-twentieth of a pound or about 20.3 grams of silver. One schilling had 12 denarii or deniers ("pennies"). There were, however, no silver schilling coins in the Carolingian period, and gold schillings (equivalent to twelve silver pfennigs) were very rare.

In the 12th century, larger silver coins of multiple pfennig weight were minted, known as denarii grossi or groschen (groats). These heavier coins were valued at between 4 and 20 of the silver denarii. In the late medieval period, states of the Holy Roman Empire began minting similar silver coins of multiple pfennig weight, some of them denominated as schilling.

In the 16th century, numerous different types of schilling were minted in Europe. The English shilling was a successor of the testoon coin first minted during the reign of Edward VI in 1551, which consisted of 92.5% "sterling" silver.

By the 17th century, further devaluation resulted in schillings in the Holy Roman Empire being minted in billon (majority base metal content) instead of silver, with 48 schillings to one Reichsthaler. The English (later British) shilling continued to be minted as a silver coin until 1946, although the silver content was debased from 1920 onwards.

== Countries ==
Countries	Currency	ISO 4217 code
Kenya	Kenyan shilling	KES
Somalia	Somali shilling	SOS
Tanzania	Tanzanian shilling	TZS
Uganda	Ugandan shilling	UGX

=== Unrecognized countries ===
Countries	Currency	ISO 4217 code
Somaliland	Somaliland shilling	SOS

== British Isles ==
=== Kingdom of England ===
A shilling was a coin used in England from the reign of Henry VII (or Edward VI around 1550). The shilling continued in use after the Acts of Union of 1707 created a new United Kingdom from the Kingdoms of England and Scotland, and under Article 16 of the Articles of Union, a common currency for the new United Kingdom was created.

=== Kingdom of Scotland ===
The term shilling (Scots: schilling) was in use in Scotland from early medieval times.

=== Great Britain, then the United Kingdom of Great Britain and Ireland ===
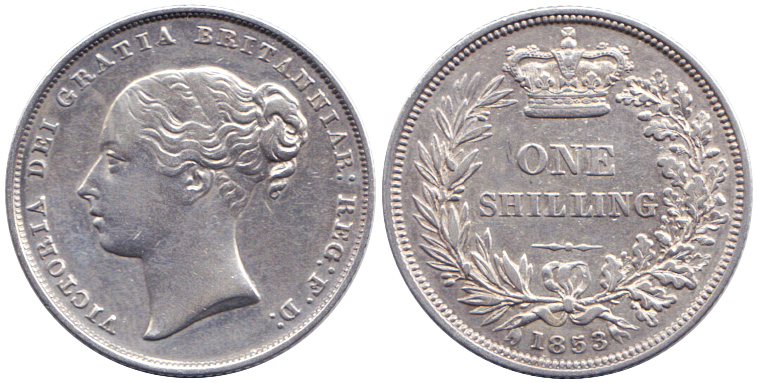
One shilling, 1853 (reign of Queen Victoria). Silver, weight 5.64 g.

The common currency for Great Britain, created in 1707 by Article 16 of the Articles of Union between England and Scotland, continued in use until decimalisation in 1971. During the Great Recoinage of 1816 (following the Acts of Union 1800 that united the Kingdoms of Great Britain and Ireland), the mint was instructed to coin one troy pound (weighing 5760 grains or 373 g) of sterling silver (0.925 fine) into 66 shillings, or its equivalent in other denominations. This set the weight of the shilling at 87.2727 grains or 5.655 grams from 1816 until 1990, when it was demonetised in favour of a new smaller 5p coin of the same value.

At decimalisation in 1971, the shilling coin was superseded by the new five-pence piece, which initially was of identical size and weight and had the same value. Shillings remained in circulation until the five pence coin was reduced in size in 1991.

Three coins denominated in multiple shillings were also in circulation at this time. They were:

- the florin, two shillings (2/–), which adopted the value of 10 new pence (10p) at decimalisation;
- the half-crown, two shillings and sixpence (2/6) or one-eighth of a pound, which was abolished at decimalisation (otherwise it would have had the value of 12 1/2p);
- the crown (five shillings or one-fourth of a pound), the highest-denominated non-bullion UK coin in circulation at decimalisation (in practice, crowns were commemorative coins not used in everyday transactions).

=== Irish shillings ===
Between 1701 and the unification of the currencies in 1825, the Irish shilling was valued at 13 pence and known as the "black hog", as opposed to the 12-pence English shillings which were known as "white hogs".

In the Irish Free State and Republic of Ireland, the shilling coin was issued as scilling (the Irish language equivalent). It was worth 1/20 of an Irish pound, and was interchangeable at the same value to the British coin, which continued to be used in Northern Ireland. The coin featured a bull on the reverse side. The first minting, from 1928 until 1941, contained 75% silver, more than the equivalent British coin. The pre-decimal Irish shilling coin (which was retained for some time after decimalisation) was withdrawn from circulation on 1 January 1993, when a smaller five-pence coin was introduced.

=== Abbreviation and slang ===
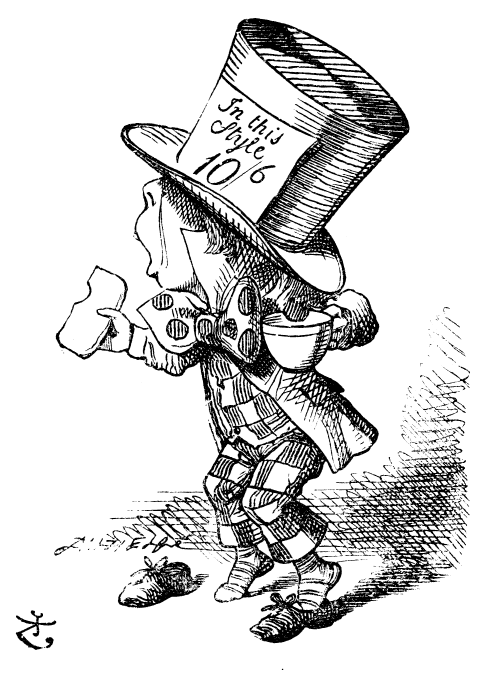
The price tag on the Hatter's hat reads '10/6'

One abbreviation for shilling is s (for solidus, see £sd). Often it was expressed by a solidus symbol (/) (which may have begun as a substitute for ſ ('long s')) thus '1/9' means "one shilling and ninepence". A price expressed as a number of shillings with no additional pence was often written as the number, a solidus and a dash: thus for example ten shillings was written '10/-'. Two shillings and sixpence (half a crown, or an eighth of a £) was written as '2/6', rarely as '2s 6d' ('d' being the abbreviation for denarius, a penny). The shilling itself was equal to twelve pence. In the traditional pounds, shillings and pence system, there were 20 shillings per pound and 12 pence per shilling, making 240 pence in a pound.

Slang terms for the old shilling coins include "bob" and "hog". While the derivation of "bob" is uncertain, John Camden Hotten in his 1864 Slang Dictionary says the original version was "bobstick" and speculates that it may be connected with Sir Robert Walpole.

== British Empire and Commonwealth ==
=== Australian shillings ===
Australian shillings, twenty of which made up one Australian pound, were first issued in 1910, with the Australian coat of arms on the reverse and King Edward VII on the face. The coat of arms design was retained through the reign of King George V until a new ram's head design was introduced for the coins of King George VI. This design continued until the last year of issue in 1963. On 14 February 1966, Australia's currency was decimalised and the shilling was replaced by a ten cent coin (Australian), where 10 shillings made up one Australian dollar.

The slang term for a shilling coin in Australia was "deener". The slang term for a shilling as currency unit was "bob", the same as in the United Kingdom.

After 1966, shillings continued to circulate, as they were replaced by ten-cent coins of the same size and weight.

=== South African shillings ===
The South African shilling was introduced in 1923, and used until 1965. Struck in silver, it bore the reigning monarch's head and titles on the obverse, and the figure of Hope on the reverse. When decimal currency was introduced in 1961, the shilling was replaced with a ten-cent coin, of similar design (but with the (supposed) portrait of Jan van Riebeeck instead of that of Queen Elizabeth II), and the two currencies were used interchangeably until 1965.

=== New Zealand shilling ===
New Zealand shillings, twenty of which made up one New Zealand pound, were first issued in 1933 and featured the image of a Maori warrior carrying a taiaha "in a warlike attitude" on the reverse. In 1967, New Zealand's currency was decimalised and the shilling was replaced by a ten-cent coin of the same size and weight. Ten-cent coins minted through the remainder of the 1960s included the legend "ONE SHILLING" on the reverse. Smaller ten-cent coins were introduced in 2006.

=== Maltese shillings ===
The shilling (Maltese: xelin, pl. xelini) was used in Malta, prior to decimalisation in 1972, and had a face value of five Maltese cents.

=== Ceylonese shillings ===
In British Ceylon (modern day Sri Lanka), a shilling (Sinhala: Silima, Tamil: Silin) was equivalent to eight fanams. With the replacement of the rixdollar by the rupee in 1852, a shilling was deemed to be equivalent to half a rupee. On the decimalisation of the currency in 1969, a shilling was deemed to be equivalent to 50 Ceylon cents. The term continued to be used colloquially until the late 20th century.

=== East African shillings ===
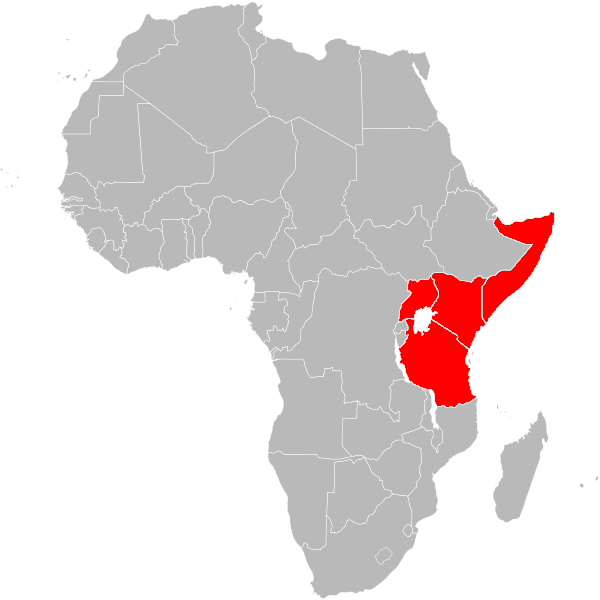
Countries in Africa where the currency is called shilling.

The East African shilling was in use in the British colonies and protectorates of British Somaliland, Kenya, Tanganyika, Uganda and Zanzibar from 1920, when it replaced the rupee, until after those countries became independent, and in Tanzania after that country was formed by the merger of Tanganyika and Zanzibar in 1964. Upon independence in 1960, the East African shilling in the British Somaliland and the Somali somalo in the Trust Territory of Somalia were replaced by the Somali shilling.

In 1966, the East African Monetary Union broke up, and the member countries replaced their currencies with the Kenyan shilling, the Ugandan shilling and the Tanzanian shilling, respectively. Though all these currencies have different values at present, there were plans to reintroduce the East African shilling as a new common currency by 2009, although this has not come about.

=== North America ===
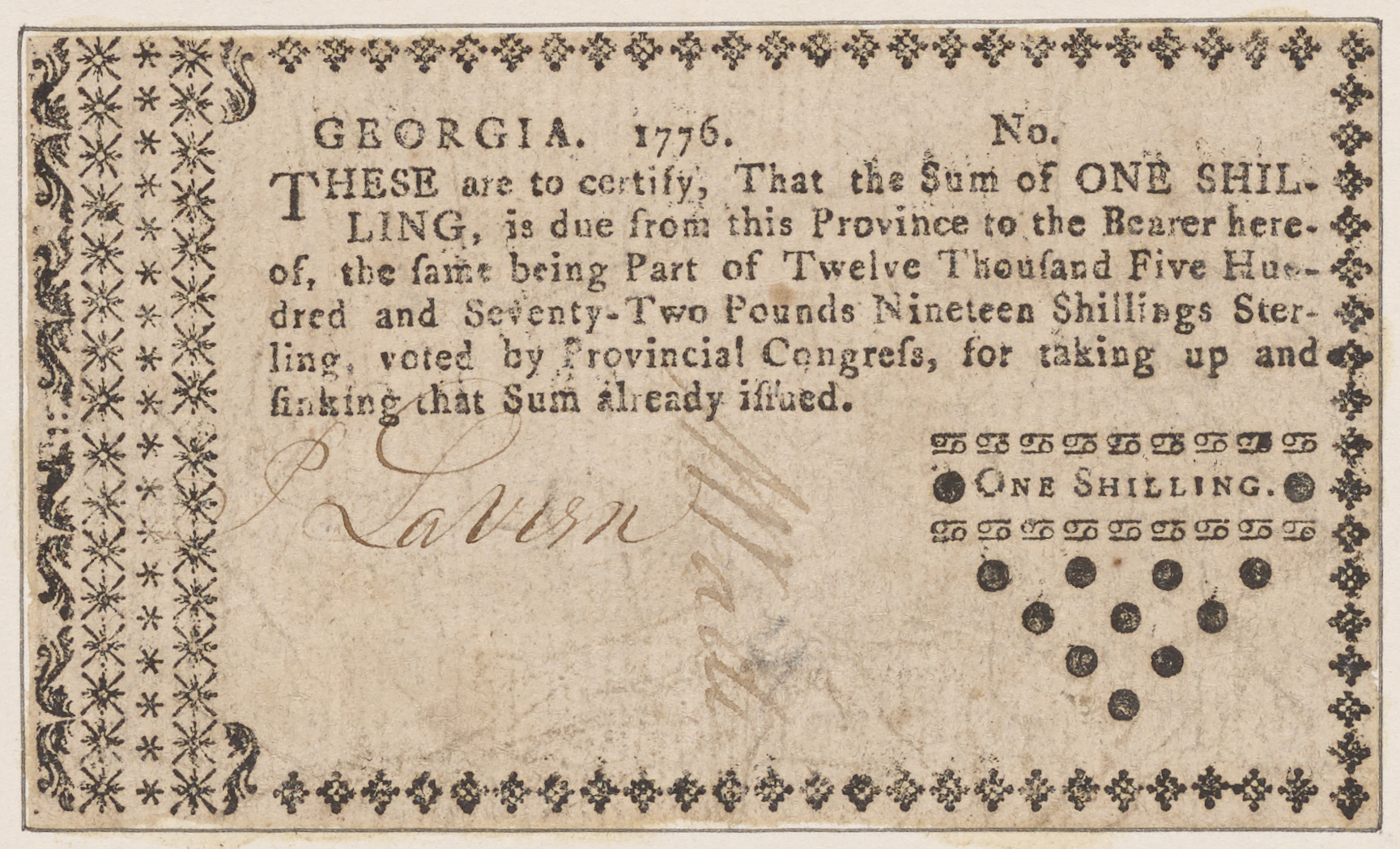
One-shilling note from Georgia, United States, 1776. The twelve dark circles indicate that there are twelve pence in a shilling.

In the thirteen British colonies that became the United States in 1776, British money was often in circulation. Each colony issued its own paper money, with pounds, shillings, and pence used as the standard units of account. Some coins were minted in the colonies, such as the pine tree shilling in the Massachusetts Bay Colony. After the United States adopted the dollar as its unit of currency and accepted the gold standard, one British shilling was worth 24 US cents. Due to ongoing shortages of US coins in some regions, shillings continued to circulate well into the nineteenth century. Shillings are described as the standard monetary unit throughout the autobiography of Solomon Northup (1853) and mentioned several times in the Horatio Alger Jr. story Ragged Dick (1868). Prices in an 1859 advertisement in a Chicago newspaper were given in dollars and shillings.

In British North America, £sd currencies were in use both during the French period (New France livre) and after the British conquest the colonies that would become Canada had their own currencies such as the Nova Scotian pound, the New Brunswick pound, and the Canadian pound. Between the 1760s and 1840s in Lower Canada, both French and British-based pounds coexisted as units of account, the French livre being close in value to the British shilling. A variety of coinage circulated. By 1858, a decimal Canadian dollar came into use in the Province of Canada. Other parts of British North America decimalized shortly afterwards, for example with the New Brunswick dollar, and Canadian Confederation in 1867 passed control of currency to the federal government.

=== Somali shilling ===
The Somali shilling is the official currency of Somalia. It is subdivided into 100 cents (English), senti (Somali, also سنت) or centesimi (Italian).

The Somali shilling has been the currency of parts of Somalia since 1921, when the East African shilling was introduced to the former British Somaliland protectorate. Following independence in 1960, the somalo of Italian Somaliland and the East African shilling (which were equal in value) were replaced at par in 1962 by the Somali shilling. Names used for the denominations were cent, centesimo (plural: centesimi) and سنت (plurals: سنتيمات and سنتيما) together with shilling, scellino (plural: scellini) and شلن.

That same year, the Banca Nazionale Somala issued notes for 5, 10, 20 and 100 scellini/shillings. In 1975, the Bankiga Qaranka Soomaaliyeed (Somali National Bank) introduced notes for 5, 10, 20 and 100 shilin/shillings. These were followed in 1978 by notes of the same denominations issued by the Bankiga Dhexe Ee Soomaaliya (Central Bank of Somalia). 50 shilin/shillings notes were introduced in 1983, followed by 500 shilin/shillings in 1989 and 1000 shilin/shillings in 1990. Also in 1990 there was an attempt to reform the currency at 100 to 1, with new banknotes of 20 and 50 new shilin prepared for the redenomination.

Following the breakdown in central authority that accompanied the civil war, which began in the early 1990s, the value of the Somali shilling was disrupted. The Central Bank of Somalia, the nation's monetary authority, also shut down operations. Rival producers of the local currency, including autonomous regional entities such as the Somaliland territory, subsequently emerged.

Somalia's newly established Transitional Federal Government revived the defunct Central Bank of Somalia in the late 2000s. In terms of financial management, the monetary authority is in the process of assuming the task of both formulating and implementing monetary policy. Owing to a lack of confidence in the Somali shilling, the US dollar is widely accepted as a medium of exchange alongside the Somali shilling. Dollarization notwithstanding, the large issuance of the Somali shilling has increasingly fueled price hikes, especially for low value transactions. This inflationary environment, however, is expected to come to an end as soon as the Central Bank assumes full control of monetary policy and replaces the presently circulating currency introduced by the private sector.

=== Somaliland shilling ===
The Somaliland shilling is the official currency of Somaliland, a self-declared republic that is internationally recognised as an autonomous region of Somalia. The currency is not recognised as legal tender by the international community, and it currently has no official exchange rate. It is regulated by the Bank of Somaliland, Somaliland's central bank. Although the authorities in Somaliland have attempted to bar usage of the Somali shilling, Somalia's official currency is still in circulation in some regions.

=== Other ===
Elsewhere in the former British Empire, forms of the word shilling remain in informal use. In Vanuatu and Solomon Islands, selen is used in Bislama and Pijin to mean "money"; in Malaysia, syiling (pronounced like shilling) means "coin". In Egypt and Jordan the shillin (Arabic: شلن) is equal to 1/20 (five qirshes — Arabic: قرش, English: piastres) of the Egyptian pound or the Jordanian dinar. In Belize, the term shilling is commonly used to refer to twenty-five cents.

== Other countries ==
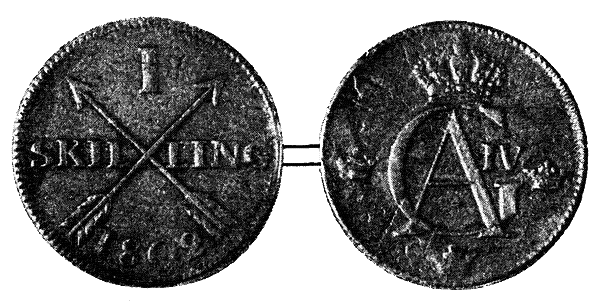
A Swedish Skilling from 1802

- The Austrian schilling was the currency of Austria between 1 March 1924 and 1938 and again between 1945 and 2002. It was replaced by the euro at a fixed parity of €1 = 13.7603 schilling. The schilling was divided into 100 groschen.
- In the principalities covering present Netherlands, Belgium and Luxemburg, the cognate term schelling was used as an equivalent 'arithmetic' currency, a 'solidus' representing 12 'denarii' or 1/20 'pound', while actual coins were rarely physical multiples of it, but still expressed in these terms.
- Shillings were issued in the Scandinavian countries (skilling) until the Scandinavian Monetary Union of 1873, and in the city of Hamburg, Germany.
- In Poland szeląg was used.
- The soll, later the sou, both also derived from the Roman solidus, were the equivalent coins in France, while the sol (PEN) remains the currency of Peru.
- As in France, the Peruvian sol was originally named after the Roman solidus, but the name of the Peruvian currency is now much more closely linked to the Spanish word for the sun (sol). This helps explain the name of its temporary replacement, the inti, named for the Incan sun god.
