= Abdirahman Duale Mohamud =

- Cabdiraxmaan Ducaale Maxamuud

Governor of the Bank of Somaliland
- In office 1997 – August 2010

Personal details
- Died: December 19, 2012 Hargeisa, Somaliland
- Occupation: Economist, central banker

Abdirahman Duale Mohamud (Somali: Cabdiraxmaan Ducaale Maxamuud), commonly known as Daamir, was a prominent Somaliland economist and public official who served as the Governor of the Central Bank of Somaliland from 1997 to 2010. During his time as governor, he used a simple policy to help the economy. He put foreign money, like US dollars, directly into the market from the central bank. He did this to stop high inflation and to protect the value of the Somaliland shilling. He was regarded as a foundational pillar of the nation's financial institutions, playing a critical role in establishing the central bank's infrastructure and overseeing the management of the Somaliland shilling.

== Biography ==
=== Governor of Central Bank of Somaliland ===
In 1997, Abdirahman became governor of Bank of Somaliland, the Central Bank.

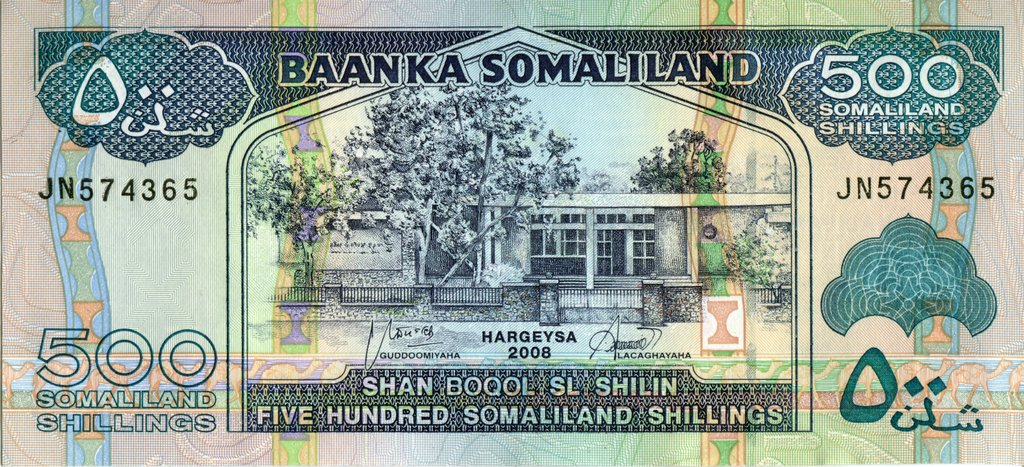
A Somaliland banknote issued in 2008. The signature of Abdirahman appears in the lower left-center over the title “GUDDOOMIYAHA (Governer.)”

Starting from 1999, the signature of the Governor of the Bank of Somaliland on Somaliland banknotes was changed to that of Abdirahman.

In an interview in 2006, Abdirahman stated that the Bank of Somaliland was an independent institution as stipulated in the constitution and operated on fees collected from customers. He noted that international organizations based in Somaliland did not deposit any funds with the Bank of Somaliland, utilizing domestic remittances instead, and therefore the bank only provided services to government employees and a small number of private customers. Additionally, he stated that the bank printed the Somaliland shilling on its own without the approval of the House of Representatives. He further explained that foreign currency was required to print the Somaliland shilling, and approximately $13 million was currently needed to ensure that the circulating currency could cover the printing costs and leave sufficient funds to meet the needs of Somaliland society and its citizens.

In 2007, Abdirahman stated that he believed the Bank of Somaliland did not support the development of Islamic banking in the country, as it would disrupt the existing balance.

In June 2009, Abdirahman established a central bank branch in Las Anod, eastern Somaliland. Since the town came under Somaliland's control in November 2007, it had lacked foreign exchange and commercial banks, and the Somaliland shilling had not been widely circulated.

In June 2010, it was reported that President Dahir Riyale Kahin, in collusion with the Berbera port manager and the Governor of the Bank of Somaliland, Abdirahman Duale, was buying voter cards from citizens in districts with strong opposition support and throwing them away.

In August 2010, the newly inaugurated President Ahmed Mohamed Mohamud Silanyo appointed Abdi Dirir Abdi as the Governor of the Bank of Somaliland, replacing Abdirahman.

=== Death ===
After that Abdirahman had been residing in Hargeisa unti his death.

In September 2010, Abdirahman was not allowed to leave the country. This happened because the government was checking the central bank. The Auditor General found out that Duale planned to travel, so he sent a letter. The letter asked Duale to stay in the country and answer questions about the bank's money. Duale was unhappy and said the government did this to hurt his reputation for political reasons.

On 19 December 2012, Abdirahman died at Shifo Hospital, a private hospital in Hargeisa, after being admitted for health complications earlier that day. His passing was marked by a national tribute from President Ahmed Mohamed Mohamud (Silanyo), who extended condolences to his family and the people of Somaliland, and he was subsequently buried with a state funeral at the Naasa Hablood cemetery located in the eastern part of the capital city.
