= Bank of Somaliland =

Somaliland's central bank

Coordinates: 9.5618°N 44.0638°E

Bank of Somaliland Baanka Somaliland البنك المركزي صوماليلاند
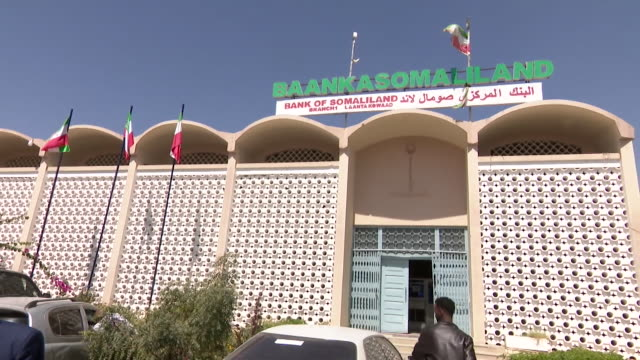
- Seal of the Bank of Somaliland Standard tableau of the Bank of Somaliland Bank of Somaliland Building
- Central bank of: Somaliland
- Headquarters: Hargeisa, Somaliland
- Established: October 1, 1994
- Ownership: 100% state ownership
- Currency: Somaliland shilling
- Website: cb.govsomaliland.org

The Bank of Somaliland (Somali: Baanka Somaliland, Arabic: البنك المركزي صوماليلاند) is the monetary authority, central bank, and commercial bank of Somaliland. Established in 1994, the central bank is provided for in the constitution of Somaliland. It has a head office in Hargeisa, in addition to sixteen other branches in the country.

== Governers ==
- Barreh Hajj Omer 1994 -
- Ahmed Abdi Mohamoud
- Abdirahman Duale Mohamud 1997 - 2010/08
- Abdi Dirir Abdi 2010/08 - 2015/03
- Abdilahi Hirsi Jama Ali (Cabdilaahi X. Jaamac Cali) 2015/03 -
- Mohamed Abdi Ibrahim (Maxamed Cabdi Ibraahim (Dhoobaale)) 2016/12 - 2018/04
- Ali Ibrahim Jama (Baqdaadi) (Cali Ibraahim Jaamac) 2018/04 -
- Ali Abdilahi Dahir Hirsi (Cali Cabdillaahi Daahir Xirsi) 2021/09 -
- Ali Dahir Abdilahi (Cali Daahir Cabdillaahi)
- Abdinasir Ahmed Hersi (Cabdinaasir Axmed Xirsi Maxamed) 2025/01 -

== History ==
In 1952, National Bank of India (NBI), which later merged with Grindlays Bank to form National and Grindlays Bank, established branches in Berbera and Hargeisa in what was then British Somaliland. NBI, the first bank in the protectorate, was the banker to the colonial government until in 1960 the State of Somaliland (formerly British Somaliland) joined the Trust Territory of Somalia (formerly Italian Somaliland) to form the Somali Republic. After the bloodless coup d'état of 1969 that saw Mohamed Siad Barre's ascension to power, in 1971 the government nationalized the four foreign banks. The government combined Banco di Roma, Banco di Napoli, and National and Grindlays Bank to form the Somali Commercial Bank. The government also established the Somali Savings and Credit Bank to take over the commercial branches of Banca Nazionale Somala and Banque de Port-Said, leaving the Banca Nazionale Somala with only central banking functions. The Somali Savings and Credit Bank had branches in Baidoa, Beledweyne, Berbera, Bosaso, Burco, Galkacyo, Qardho, Hargeisa and Kismayo, and for a time also in Djibouti. In 1990, the Commercial and Savings Bank of Somalia discontinued operations. The Central Bank of Somalia also ceased to function at an undetermined date.

The Bank of Somaliland was established in 1994, three years after the independence of Somaliland. It has branches in most cities and towns in the country, with a recent one being built in Oodweyne.

== Objectives ==
In line with Article 3 of the Constitutive Law of Somaliland Bank, the bank aims to:

- maintain price and exchange rate stability
- promote credit and trade condition which support balanced economic growth
- support the economic and financial policies of the government where possible

== Financial Organizations ==
The Bank of Somaliland isn't recognised by any country which is a factor in why it is not a part of many financial organizations or any at all. In 2022 the Bank of Somaliland "joined forces" with the Accounting and Auditing Organization for Islamic Financial Institutions or AAOIFI marking a turning point for Somaliland and its future.

== Currency and Exchange Rate ==
1996-1996 notes
Obverse	Reverse	Value	Main Colour	Obverse	Reverse	Date(s) of issue
		5/-	Green	Camel caravan in front of Naasa Hablood Hills near Hargeisa	Goodirka Building (Former House of Representatives, later Supreme Court) in Hargeisa, and a kudu to the right	1994
		10/-	Purple	Camel caravan in front of Naasa Hablood Hills near Hargeisa	Goodirka Building (Former House of Representatives, later Supreme Court) in Hargeisa, and a kudu to the right	1994, 1996
		20/-	Brown	Camel caravan in front of Naasa Hablood Hills near Hargeisa	Goodirka Building (Former House of Representatives, later Supreme Court) in Hargeisa, and a kudu to the right	1994, 1996
		50/-	Blue	Camel caravan in front of Naasa Hablood Hills near Hargeisa	Goodirka Building (Former House of Representatives, later Supreme Court) in Hargeisa, and a kudu to the right	1996, 1996, 1999
		100/-	Khaki	Berbera dockside with Somali sheep and goats	Bank of Somaliland in Hargeisa	1994, 1996, 1999, 2002, 2005, 2006, 2008, 2011
		500/-	Blue	Berbera dockside with Somali sheep and goats	Bank of Somaliland in Hargeisa	1994, 1996, 1999, 2002, 2005, 2006, 2008, 2011
		1,000/-	Red	Berbera dockside with Somali sheep and goats	Bank of Somaliland in Hargeisa	2011, 2012, 2014, 2015
		5,000/-	Green	Three camels and three goats foraging	Bank of Somaliland in Hargeisa	2011, 2012, 2015
These images are to scale at 0.7 pixel per millimetre (18 pixel per inch). For table standards, see the banknote specification table.

The Central bank provides exchange services for various currencies at the official government rate, but most people prefer the unofficial rates used by hawala agents and money changers on the streets of main cities.

- USD/SLSh: 1 USD -570 - 768 SLSh.
- GBP/SLSh: 1 GBP - 768 SLSh.
- EUR/SLSh: 1 EUR 670 - 677 SLSh

Somaliland Central Bank Authority can dictate its currency value on flotation of its currency pending recognition. it could see substantial GDP rise and budget rise and GDP capita rise with Currency value towards the Dollar as Somaliland currency was devalued due to civil war with 580 shillings normal, United nations state new country's can dictate the value of its currency and Somaliland would like pick pre civil war values between 78 Somaliland shillings to 160 Somaliland shillings that would cause a GDP rise towards Dollar and Euro. Currency valuation factors include, investment confidence, creditability of national bank, and foreign reserves. Somaliland's credibility for loans would increase upon recognition, and investment confidence is high with many investments in manufacturing and maritime shipping.

== See also ==
- List of banks in Somaliland
- List of central banks of Africa
- Economy of Somaliland
- Somaliland shilling
- Commonwealth banknote-issuing institutions
