= Somaliland shilling =

Currency of Somaliland

شلن صوماليلاندي (Arabic); Shilin Somaliland (Somali)
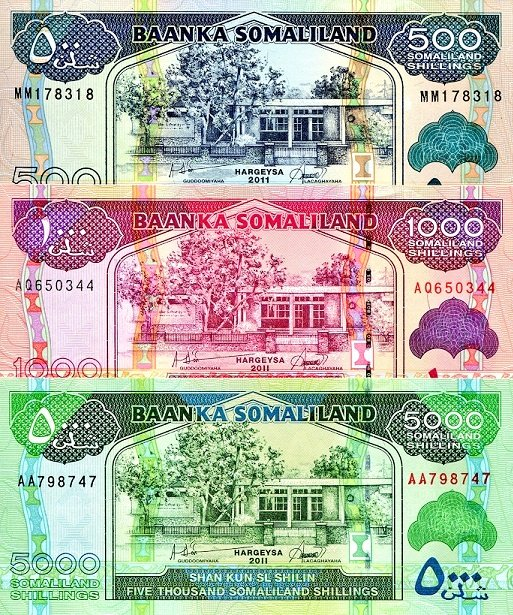
- 500/-, 1,000/- and 5,000/- banknotes

ISO 4217
- Code: None

Units of account
- Symbol: Sl.Sh. SLSH, /-

Denominations
- Banknotes
- Freq. used: 100/-, 500/-, 1,000/-, 5,000/-
- Rarely used: 5/-, 10/-, 20/-, 50/-,
- Coins
- Rarely used: 1/-, 5/-, 10/-, 20/-

Demographics
- User(s): Somaliland

Issuance
- Central bank: Bank of Somaliland (Baanka Somaliland)
- Website: https://cb.govsomaliland.org/

Valuation
- Pegged with: U.S. dollar ($) = ~ 10,000 shillings

The Somaliland shilling (Somali: Shillin Somaliland, Arabic: شلن صوماليلاندي; abbreviation: Sl.Sh. or SLSH; symbol: /-) is the official currency of the Republic of Somaliland, a partially recognised state in the Horn of Africa, recognised by most countries as de jure part of Somalia.

== Overview ==
The shilling has been the currency of parts of Somalia since 1921, when the East African shilling was introduced to the former British Somaliland protectorate. Following the 1960 independence and unification of the former territories of British Somaliland and Italian Somaliland, their respective currencies, the East African shilling and somalo (which were equal in value) were replaced at par in 1962 by the Somali shilling. Names used for its denominations were cent (singular: centesimo; plural: centesimi) and سنت (plural: سنتيمات), along with shilling (singular: scellino; plural: scellini) and شلن.

In September 1994, the Parliament of Somaliland endorsed President Egal's plans to introduce a new currency to replace the Somali shilling. The Somaliland shilling was introduced on 18 October 1994 at a rate of Sl.So. 1/- to So.Sh. 100/-. The Somali shilling ceased to be accepted as legal tender in Somaliland on 31 January 1995.

The Somaliland shilling is pegged to the United States dollar at a rate of Sl.Sh. 580/12 to US$1. Only the 100/-, 500/-, 1,000/- and 5,000/- banknotes are currently in circulation.

== Coins ==
The Somaliland shilling is nominally divided into 100 cents, but coins denominated in cents have never been issued due to their low value. The coin with the lowest value to have been issued is the 1/- coin, first minted in 1994 at the Pobjoy Mint in England and thus bearing the PM mint mark. In 2002, 2/- and 5/- coins were issued, bearing depictions of explorer Sir Richard Burton and a cockerel, respectively. Other coins that have been issued are the 10/- coin (depicting a vervet monkey) and 20/- coin (depicting an Italian Greyhound). Somaliland coins are not currently being minted or circulated.

The 1/- and 5/- coins are struck in aluminium, the 10/- coin in brass, the 20/- coin in stainless steel, and the 1,000/- coin in .999 fine silver.

1/- coin (1994)

This was the first coin issued by the Somaliland government. The coin depicts a Somali pigeon (Columba oliviae). The PM (Pobjoy Mint) mint mark is located near the bird's tail feathers. The words "REPUBLIC OF SOMALILAND 1994" are inscribed on the obverse of the coin; the reverse of the coin bears the words "BAANKA SOMALILAND" and "ONE SOMALILAND SHILLING" around the "1/-" in the centre.

5/- coins (2002)

There are two coins in this denomination, both issued in 2002. The first bears a portrait of Sir Richard Francis Burton, the second depicts a rooster.

The specifications of the first coin are as follows:

The obverse of the coin has the words "RICHARD F. BURTON EXPLORATION OF SOMALILAND" inscribed around Burton's portrait. The dates "1841 1904" are to the left of the portrait, and "2002" is to the right. "BAANKA SOMALILAND" and "FIVE SOMALILAND SHILLINGS" are inscribed on the reverse around the "5/-" in the centre.

The specifications of the second coin are as follows:

The obverse of this coin has the words "REPUBLIC OF SOMALILAND 2002" inscribed on it and depicts a cockerel. As with the other 5/- coin, the dates "1841 1904" are to the left of the portrait, and "2002" is to the right. 'BAANKA SOMALILAND' and 'FIVE SOMALILAND SHILLINGS' are also inscribed on the reverse around the "5/-" in the centre.

10/- coin (2002)

The Sl.Sh.10/- coin obverse depicts a vervet monkey, around which the words "REPUBLIC OF SOMALILAND 2002" are inscribed. The reverse of the coin has "BAANKA SOMALILAND" and "TEN SOMALILAND SHILLINGS" inscribed around the "10/-" in the centre.

20/- coin (2002)

The obverse of the 20/- coin depicts an Italian Greyhound and has the words "REPUBLIC OF SOMALILAND 2002" inscribed around it. The reverse has "BAANKA SOMALILAND" and "TWENTY SOMALILAND SHILLINGS" inscribed around the "20/-" in the centre.

Obverse	Reverse	Value	Obverse	Reverse	Date of issue
		1/-	The obverse depicts a Somali pigeon (Columba oliviae)	"BAANKA SOMALILAND" and "ONE SOMALILAND SHILLING" appear above and below the "1/-" in the centre	1994
		5/-	There were two coins of this denomination, both issued in 2002. The first coin obverse has a portrait of Sir Richard Francis Burton, while the second depicts a rooster.	"BAANKA SOMALILAND" and "FIVE SOMALILAND SHILLINGS" appear above and below the "5/-" in the centre	2002
		10/-	The obverse depicts a vervet monkey	"BAANKA SOMALILAND" and "TEN SOMALILAND SHILLINGS" appear above and below the "10/-" in the centre	2002
		20/-	The obverse depicts an Italian Greyhound	"BAANKA SOMALILAND" and "TWENTY SOMALILAND SHILLINGS" appear above and below the "20/-" in the centre	2002

== Banknotes ==
Banknotes were issued in denominations of 5/-, 10/-, 20/-, 50/-, 100/-, 500/-, 1,000/- and 5,000/-; dates of issue range from 1994 to 2011. Currently, only the 100/-, 500/-, 1,000/- and 5,000/- notes are in circulation.

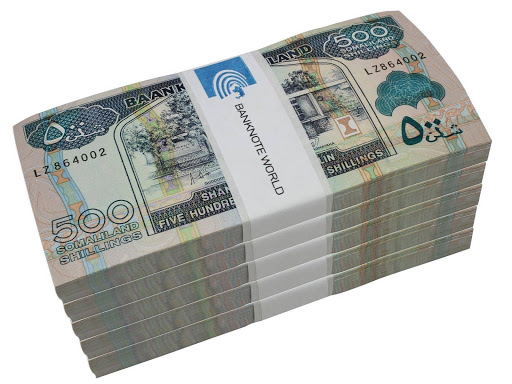
500/- notes.

1996-2011 notes
Obverse	Reverse	Value	Main Colour	Obverse	Reverse	Date(s) of issue
		5/-	Green	Camel caravan in front of Naasa Hablood Hills near Hargeisa	Goodirka Building (Former House of Representatives, later Supreme Court) in Hargeisa, and a kudu to the right	1994
		10/-	Purple	Camel caravan in front of Naasa Hablood Hills near Hargeisa	Goodirka Building (Former House of Representatives, later Supreme Court) in Hargeisa, and a kudu to the right	1994, 1996
		20/-	Brown	Camel caravan in front of Naasa Hablood Hills near Hargeisa	Goodirka Building (Former House of Representatives, later Supreme Court) in Hargeisa, and a kudu to the right	1994, 1996
		50/-	Blue	Camel caravan in front of Naasa Hablood Hills near Hargeisa	Goodirka Building (Former House of Representatives, later Supreme Court) in Hargeisa, and a kudu to the right	1996, 1999
		100/-	Khaki	Berbera dockside with Somali sheep and goats	Bank of Somaliland in Hargeisa	1994, 1996, 1999, 2002, 2005, 2006, 2008, 2011, 2016
		500/-	Blue	Berbera dockside with Somali sheep and goats	Bank of Somaliland in Hargeisa	1994, 1996, 1999, 2002, 2005, 2006, 2008, 2011, 2016
		1,000/-	Red	Berbera dockside with Somali sheep and goats	Bank of Somaliland in Hargeisa	2011, 2012, 2014, 2015, 2016
		5,000/-	Green	Three camels and three goats foraging	Bank of Somaliland in Hargeisa	2011, 2012, 2015, 2016
These images are to scale at 0.7 pixel per millimetre (18 pixel per inch). For table standards, see the banknote specification table.

In 1996 and 1999, regular 50/- notes were reissued in a larger size (130 × 58 or 130 × 57 mm by difference sources).

5th Anniversary of Independence Commemorative Issue (1996)

In 1996, banknotes were overprinted with the phrase "5th Anniversary of Independence 18 May 1996 Sanad Gurada 5ee Gobanimadda 18 May 1996" in bronze/gold letters, or "Sanad Gurada 5ee Gobanimadda 18 May 1996" in silver letters to commemorate the fifth anniversary of de facto independence. However, it is unclear whether these notes were overprinted by Somaliland authorities or numismatic merchants.

== Exchange rates ==
The central bank provides exchange services for various currencies at the official government rate, but most people prefer the unofficial rates used by hawala agents and money changers on the streets of main cities. Somaliland exchange rates are set to change due to revaluation of its currency. Somaliland would have less inflation with cheaper costs of goods in Somaliland , Bank of Somaliland can realistically set the currency's value at 40 shillings per dollar. with an increase of over 3/4 in value. Revaluation would make imports cheaper by over 3/4 and reset the country's import partners where they could trade with new countries with similar currency values such as Thailand , Morocco and India

- In November 2000, the official exchange rate of Baanka Somaliland was 4,550/- for 1 US dollar. Unofficial exchange rates at the time fluctuated between 4,000/- and 5,000/- per dollar.
- In December 2008, the official rate had fallen to 7,500/- per US dollar.
- In December 2015, the generally recognized exchange rate was 6,000/- per US dollar.
- In July 2019, the generally recognized exchange rate had dropped to 8,500/- per US dollar.
- In December 2022, the official exchange rate of Baanka Somaliland was 8530/- for 1 US dollar. The Somaliland exchange rate in 2019 was 8,500/- per US dollar which is a 0.35% increase of inflation, the Somaliland Shilling remains stable around the 8,000 mark and will most likely decrease in inflation in the coming years.
- In September 2025, the generally recognized exchange rate had dropped to 10,000/- per US dollar.

== See also ==
- Economy of Somaliland

Preceded by: Somali shilling Reason: currency independence Ratio: 1 Somaliland shilling = 100 Somali shillings = 1.50 United States dollar	Currency of Somaliland; 1994 – Note: Somaliland is not widely recognized	Succeeded by: Current
