= Giovanni Fornari =

Italian diplomat

Governor of the Trust Territory of Somaliland
- In office April 1950 – 1953
- Succeeded by: Enrico Martino

Personal details
- Born: 21 May 1903 Rome, Kingdom of Italy
- Died: After 1953

Giovanni Fornari (21 May 1903 – after 1953) was an Italian diplomat, Italian Governor of the Trust Territory of Somaliland, which was again placed under Italian administration in 1950 after British occupation. He was also ambassador in Chile .

== Biography ==
Prior to World War II, Somalia was an Italian colony, but was taken by British forces in 1941. After WW2 Somaliland was again placed under Italian control by the United Nations, the focus of the new administration was largely one of economic development for the inhabitants. Illiteracy was widespread and facilities were few and far between (the war also took a toll on the colony), and Governor Fornari's responsibilities were different than those of his predecessors.

Upon entering into office, Fornari promised rewards to Somalis that supported and assisted in fully restoring Italian rule, which prompted the newly-formed Somali Youth League to send a letter of complaints to the UN advisory council. Fornari served as Governor until 1953.

== See also ==
- List of colonial governors of Italian Somaliland
