= Agriculture in Somaliland =

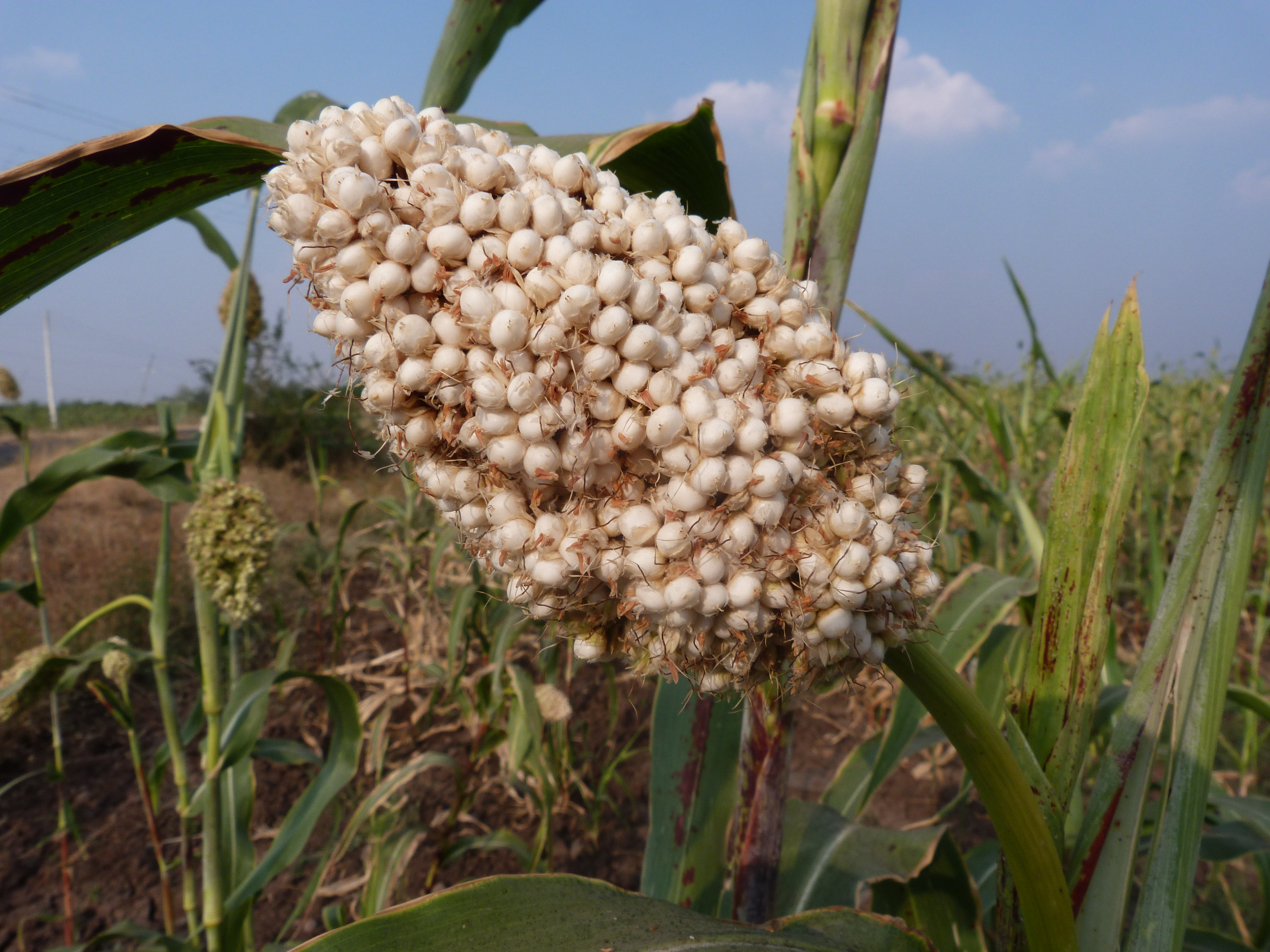
Around 51% of all crops in Somaliland are sorghum, which is used as food and cattle feed.

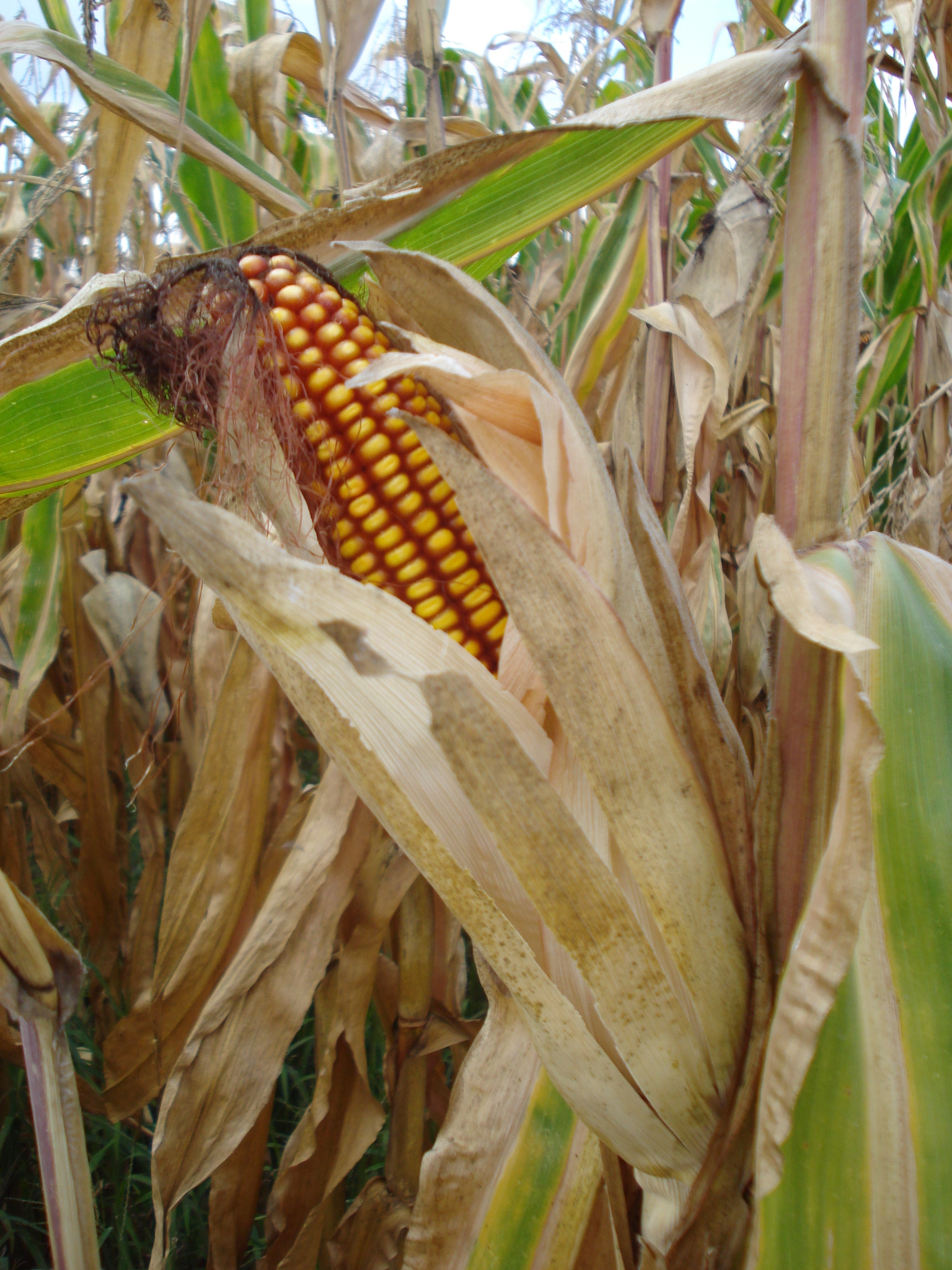
Corn is grown in Somaliland at 21% of farming land, and is used for food and cattle feed.

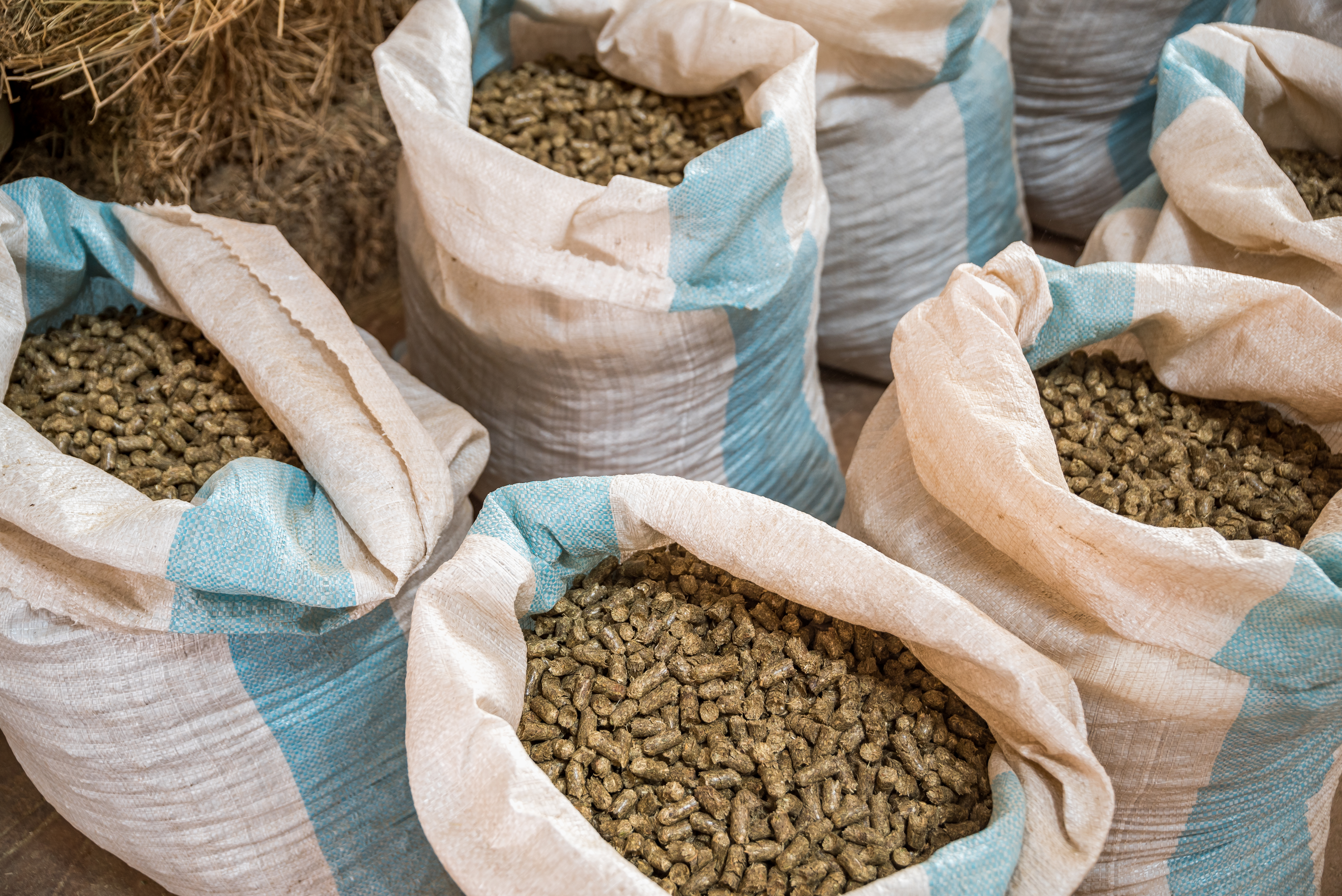
Crops such as corn and sorghum are used as cattle feed in farming in Somaliland.

Agriculture in Somaliland is the second most important of the productive sectors of Somaliland after livestock, and also is one of the main economy pillars of the country. Some of the main crops cultivated in Somaliland are sorghum, maize, tomatoes, lettuce, banana, onions, peppers, Strawberries and cabbage.

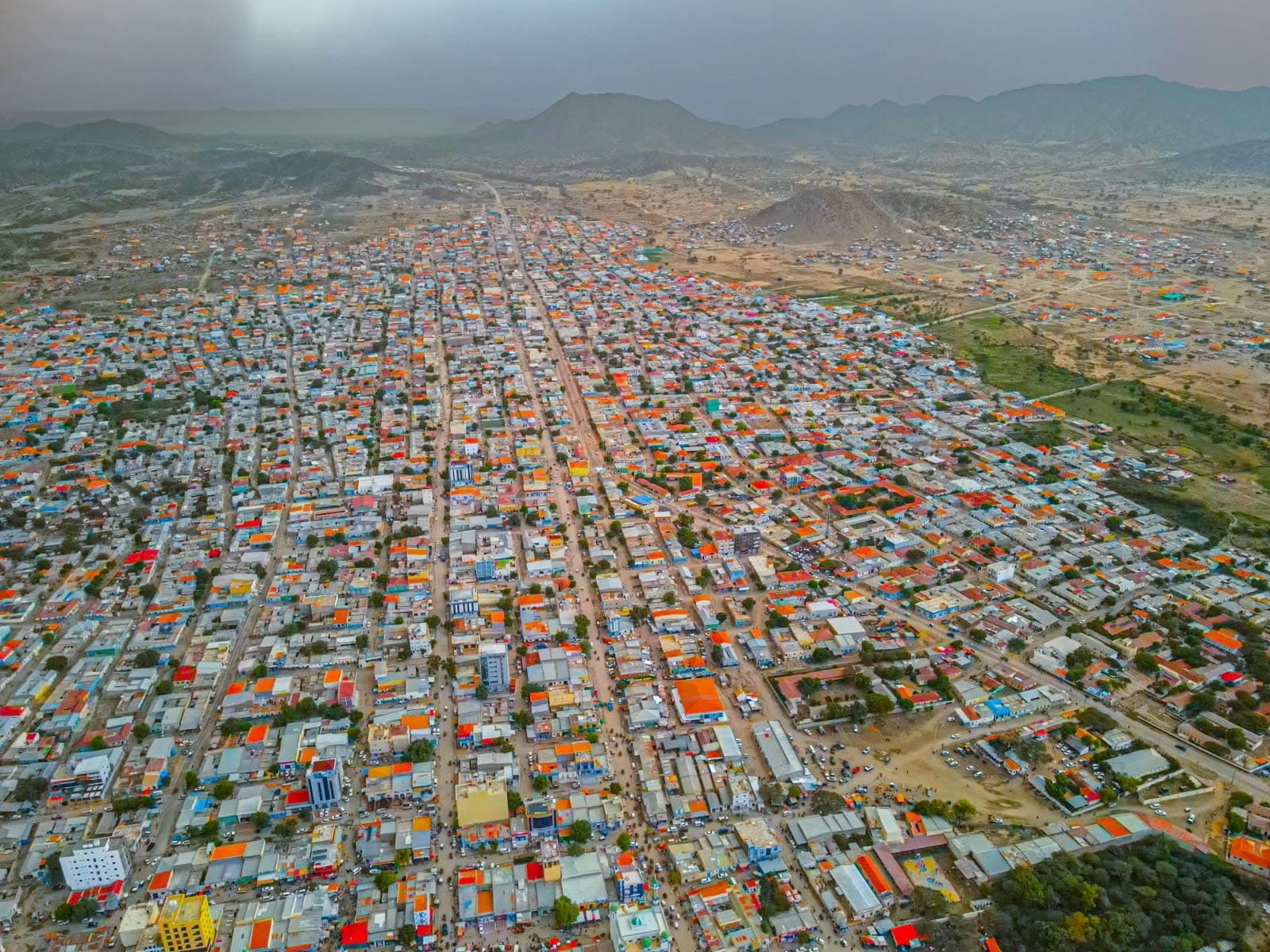
Cultivation and farming areas such as Borama in Western Somaliland transportation of crops regularly passes region towards Hargeisa the capital and eastern areas of Somaliland

Machinery such as cattle pellet grinders and harvesting tools and heavy tractor machinery are used in Somaliland agriculture, with total revenue of farming around 400Mn - 500Mn Somaliland shillings in crop sales internally. Somaliland has 45 days of rain per year, estimates of 550,000 litres of water used per year in Somaliland agriculture, recent agricultural grant from USA organisation of 100 Mn dollars to have self sustainability in farming, food security, and domestic crop production in Somaliland.

The primary method of agricultural production is rain-fed farming. Cereals are the primary crops cultivated. About 70% of the rain-fed agricultural land is used for the main crop, sorghum, while maize occupies another 25% of the land. Scattered marginal lands are also used to grow other crops like barley, millet, groundnuts, beans, and cowpeas. The majority of farms are located near riverbanks, along the banks of streams (togs) and other water sources. The primary methods of channelling water from the source to the farm are floods or crude earth canals that divert perennial water (springs) to the farm. Fruits and vegetables are grown for commercial use on the majority of irrigated farms. total farming area in Somaliland is around 350,000 hectares.

Gebiley and Awdal regions are the main areas for rain-fed productions. Somaliland has ten agro-ecological zones, eight of them are arid or desert with significant limited agricultural production, while the total arable land is estimated around 350,000 hectares or 3500 square kilometers across the country and mostly is concentrated northwestern regions, such as Awdal, Gebiley and Maroodi Jeex.

== See also ==
- Economy of Somaliland
- Livestock in Somaliland
