= Ali Ibrahim Jama =

Somaliland central banker

Ali Ibrahim Jama علي ابراهيم جامع
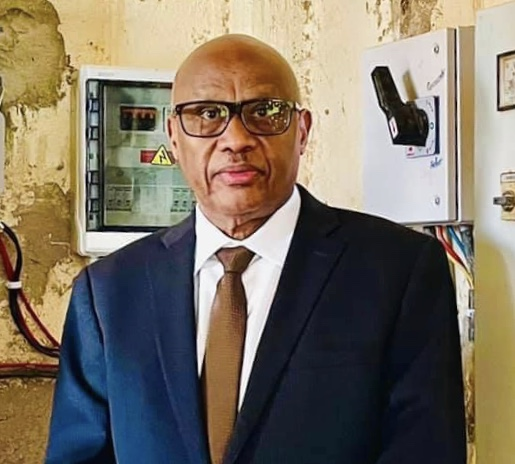
- Jama in 2020

Governor of the Bank of Somaliland
- Incumbent
- Assumed office 5 July 2018
- Nominated by: Muse Bihi Abdi
- Preceded by: Mohamed Abdi Ibrahim

Personal details
- Born: 26 June 1956 (age 70) Oodweyne, British Somaliland (now Somaliland)
- Spouse: Nura Mohomed Haliye (m. 1987)
- Children: 5
- Parents: Ibrahim Jama Ateye (father); Hadson Mohomed Ahmed (mother)
- Education: University of Baghdad; University of London; The London Institute of Banking & Finance
- Occupation: Central banker

Ali Ibrahim Jama (Somali: Cali Ibraahim Jaamac, Arabic: علي ابراهيم جامع: born. 26 June 1956), also known as Ali Baghdadi, is a Somali central banker who has been Governor of the Bank of Somaliland since 5 July 2018.
