= Economy of Somaliland =

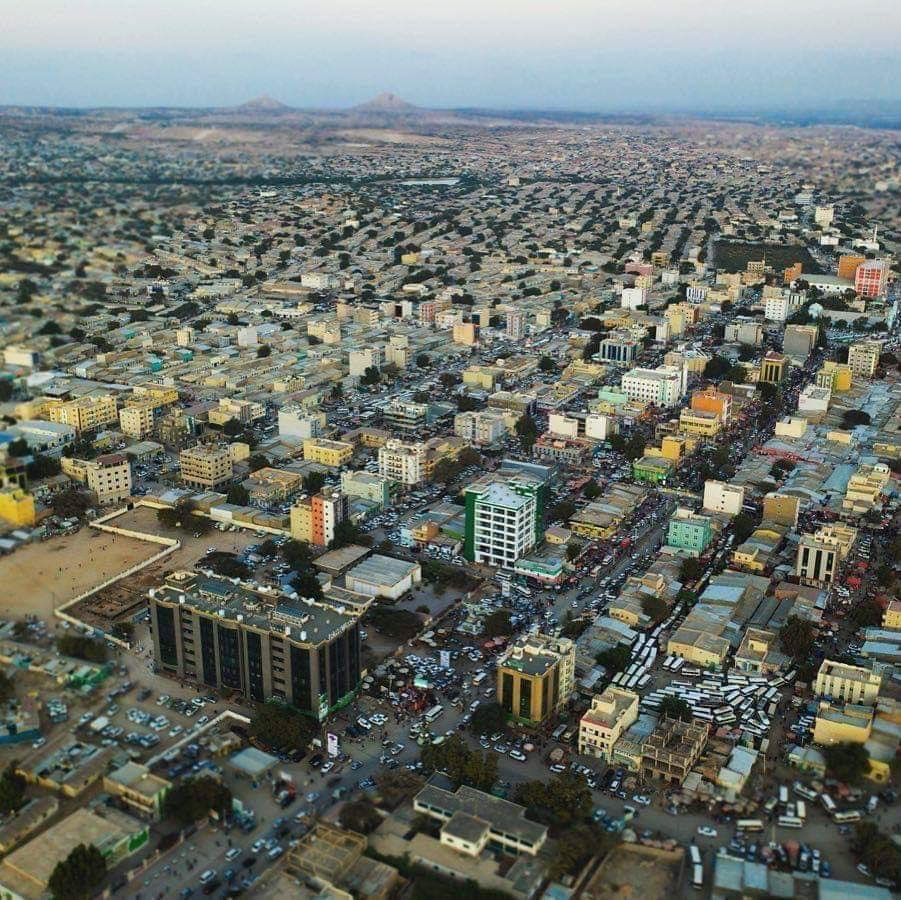
- Hargeisa Central Metropolis
- Currency: Somaliland shilling (SLS)
- Fixed exchange rates: SLS 10,000 SL/Shilling = $1 ( Dicated Value-Revaluation By Central Bank Upon Recognition)
- Country group: Developing/Emerging; Middle-Income Country; Industrializing Country

Statistics
- Population: ▲6,250,000 (2024)
- GDP: ▲$4.58 billion (nominal)
- GDP per capita: ▲$912 (nominal)
- All values, unless otherwise stated, are in US dollars.

The economy of Somaliland largely relies on primary production and agriculture, where livestock is the main export of the country, which it ships to neighbouring Djibouti and Ethiopia, as well as to Gulf states, such as UAE, Saudi Arabia and Oman. Somaliland has a GDP of $4.58 billion, and a GDP per capita of $912 The COVID-19 pandemic has restricted Somaliland's trade flows with decreased demand in the agriculture sector, a significant source of tax revenue.

Somaliland is located along the Gulf of Aden, near the entrance to the Strait of Bab al-Mandab, a major sea-lane through which almost one-third of the world's shipping passes. Its location has helped the government attract new trade and development deals. In late 2016, the DP World announced that it would invest nearly $450 million to manage and upgrade the Port of Berbera and develop a corridor running from the Port to the Ethiopian border. In 2021 the project was joined by the UK government's CDC Group which has doubled the funding. Somaliland attended the Tel Aviv Business Forum: Over 100 Israeli companies and senior Somaliland delegates, including President Abdirahman Mohamed Abdullahi, convened at the Israel Export Institute in Tel Aviv. The talks centered on long-term cooperation in agri-tech, healthcare, water, and infrastructure.

== Central Bank currency floatation ==
Somaliland upon recognition with its central bank authority can float its currency at Somaliland central bank Somaliland financial authority , Somaliland would likely gain substantial GDP rise GDP Per Capita ,budget rise and foreign reserve rises due to value changes in its currency as it was civil war that devalued its currency towards 580 shilling's per dollar.

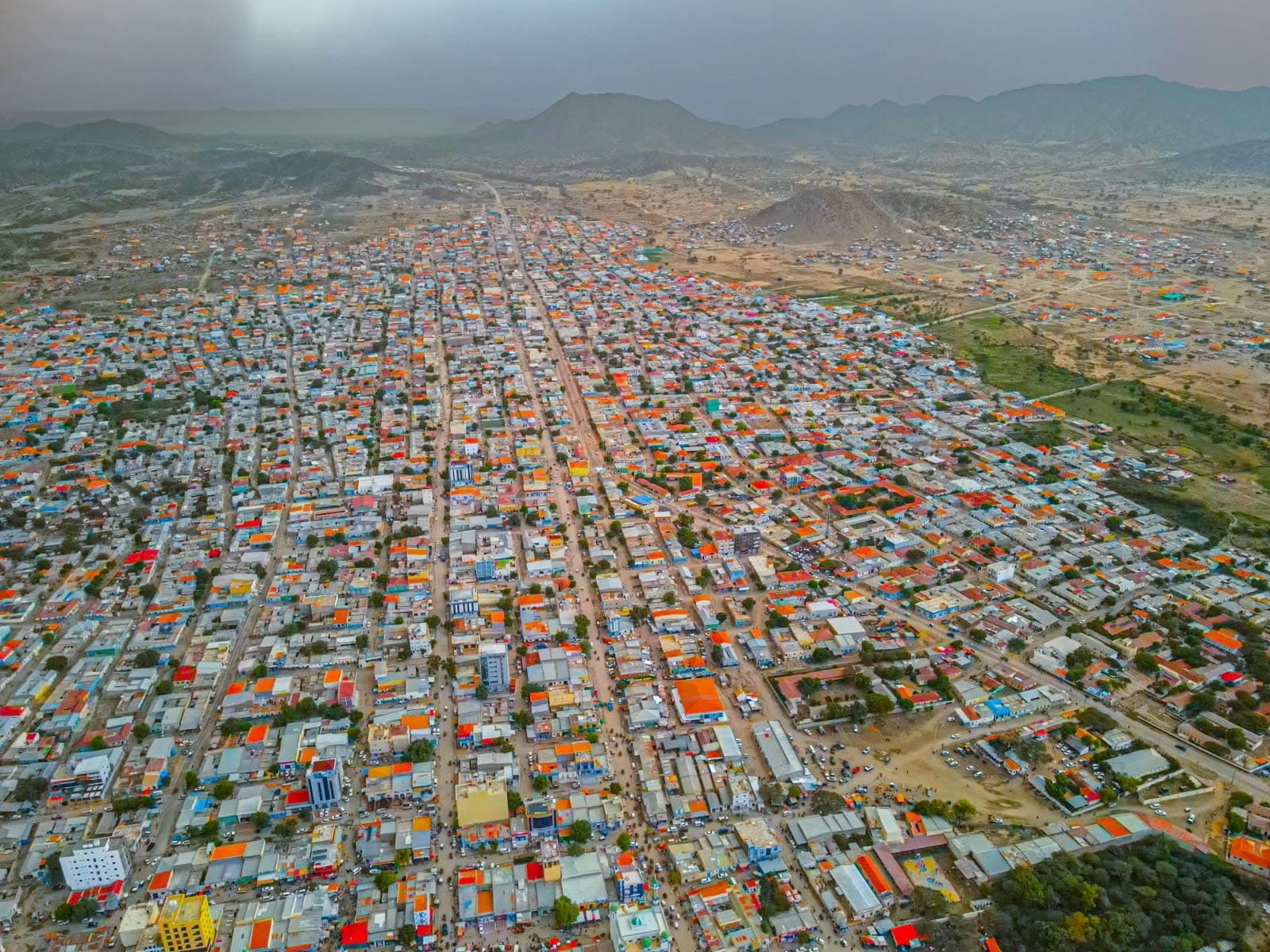
Borama a western city in Somaliland , farming region and near Tog wajaale Somaliland dry port of Western Somaliland

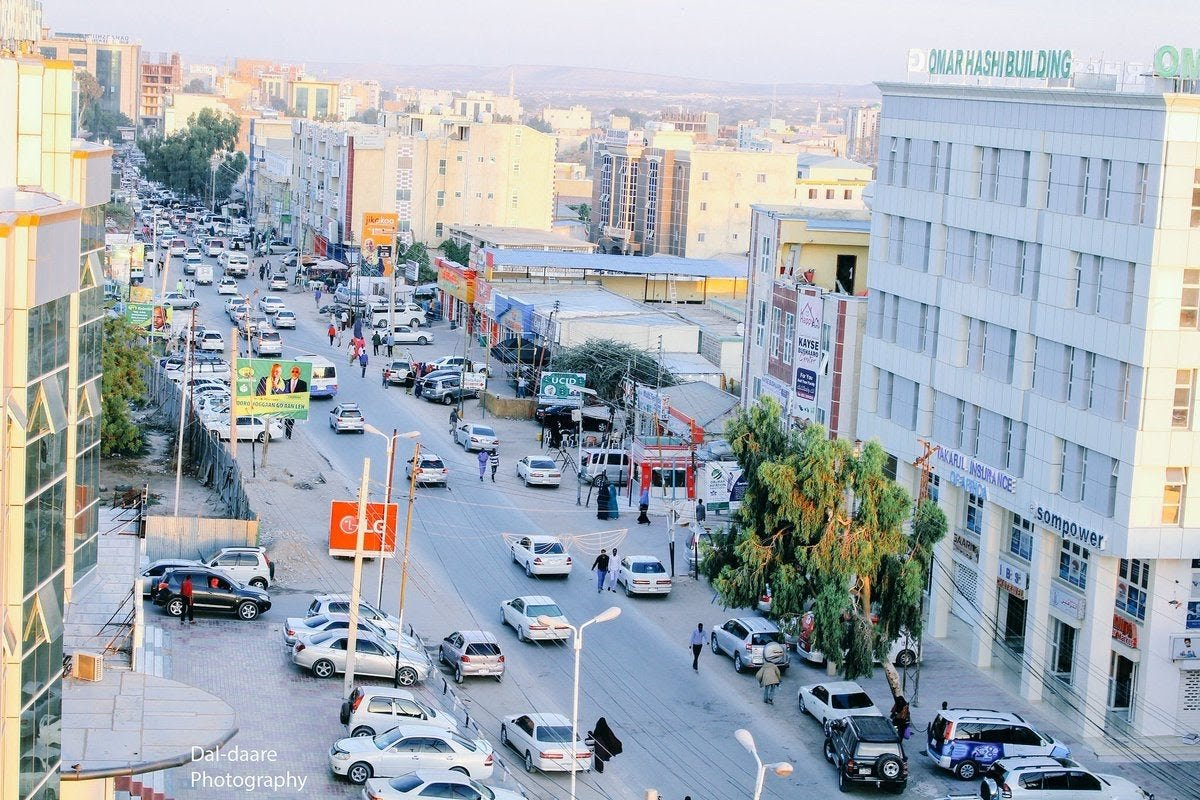
Central Hargeisa, Hargeisa hosts major road from capital towards berbera where cargo from DP world Berbera enters Hargeisa, Hargesia begun major airport redevelopment to host large number of airport arrivals with new ATCT in Hargesia

== Overview ==
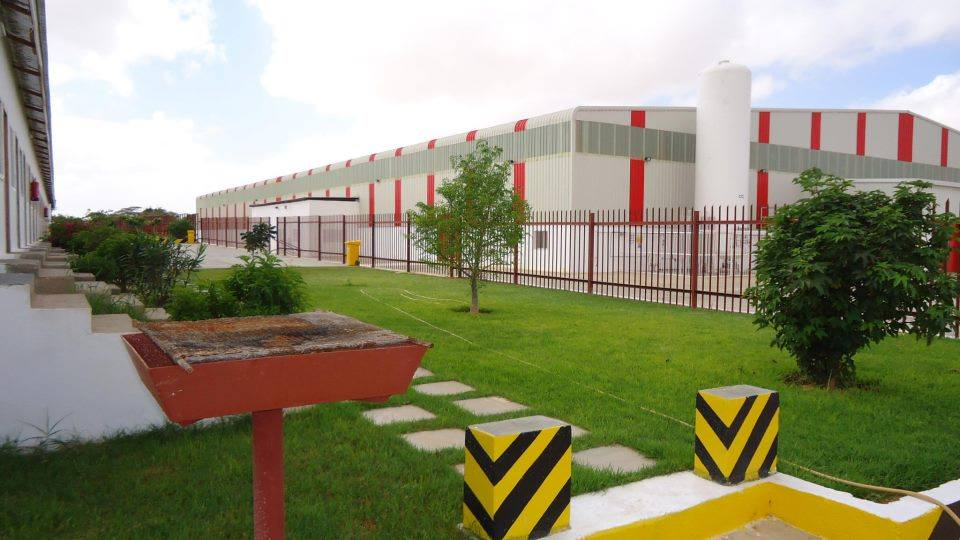
Somaliland Beverage Industries is the first ever Somaliland region bottler for Coca-Cola. In Hargeisa.

The Somaliland shilling, which virtually non-exchangeable outside Somaliland on account of the nation's lack of recognition, is regulated by the Bank of Somaliland, the central bank, which was established constitutionally in 1994 . Somaliland national bank may expand opening international branches around the world upon recognition , Somaliand would likely have foreign international banks opening banks in capital Hargesia.

Since Somaliland is unrecognised, international donors have found it difficult to provide aid. As a result, the government relies mainly upon tax receipts and remittances from the large Somali diaspora, which contribute immensely to Somaliland's economy. Remittances come to Somaliland through money transfer companies, the largest of which is Dahabshiil, one of the few Somali money transfer companies that conform to modern money-transfer regulations. The World Bank estimates that remittances worth approximately $1 billion reach Somalia annually from émigrés working in the Gulf states, Europe and the United States. Analysts say that Dahabshiil may handle around two-thirds of that figure and as much as half of it reaches Somaliland alone.

Pizza Hut Somaliland Opened in Central Hargeisa in 2023 With 2 locations In Somaliland in 2026

Since the late 1990s, service provisions have significantly improved through limited government provisions and contributions from non-governmental organisations, religious groups, the international community (especially the diaspora), and the growing private sector. Local and municipal governments have been developing key public service provisions such as water in Hargeisa and education, electricity, and security in Berbera. In 2009, the Banque pour le Commerce et l'Industrie – Mer Rouge (BCIMR), based in Djibouti, opened a branch in Hargeisa and became the first bank in the country since the 1990 collapse of the Commercial and Savings Bank of Somalia. In 2014, Dahabshil Bank International became the region's first commercial bank. In 2017 Premier Bank from Mogadishu opened a branch in Hargeisa.

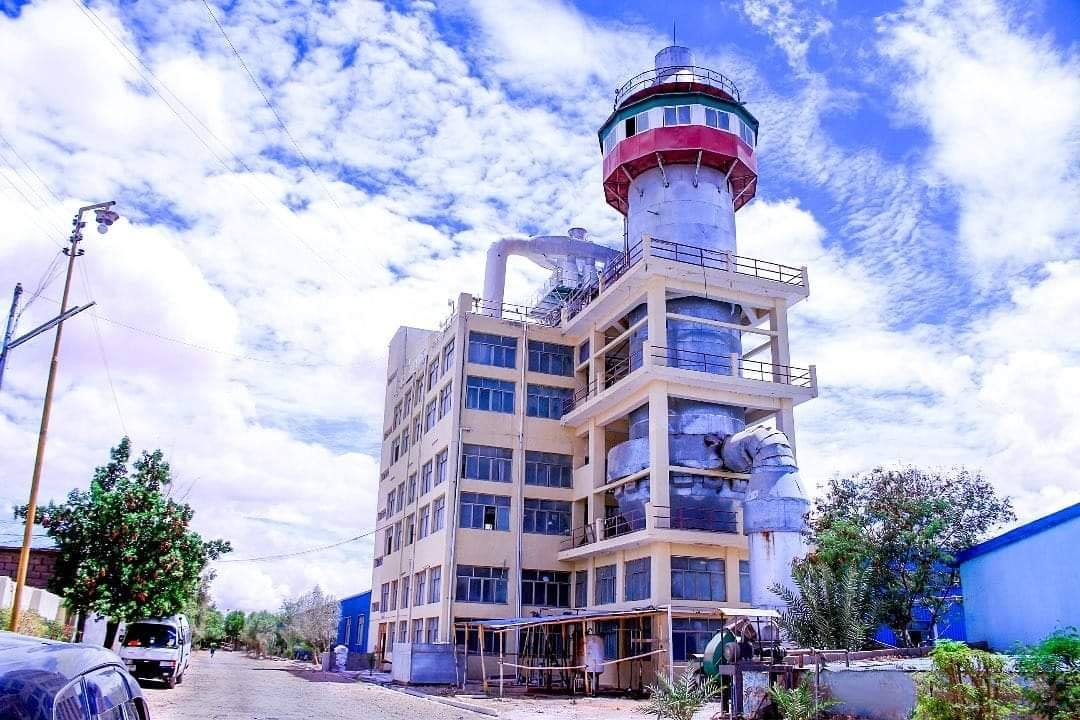
Somaliland soap factory Ileys Enterprises in Burao.

Various telecommunications firms also have branches in Somaliland. Among these companies is Telesom, one of the largest operators in Somaliland. Founded in 2002 with the objective of supplying the local market with telecommunications services such as GSM, fixed line, and Internet access, it has an extensive network that covers all of Somaliland's major cities and more than 40 districts in both Somalia and Somaliland. Telesom also offers among the cheapest international calling rates at $0.2 less than its nearest competitor. Other telecommunication firms serving the region include Somtel, Telcom and NationLink.

Livestock is the backbone of Somaliland's economy. Sheep, camels, and cattle are shipped from the Berbera port and sent to Gulf Arab countries, such as Saudi Arabia. The country is home to some of the largest livestock markets, known in Somali as seylad, in the Horn of Africa, with as many as 10,000 heads of sheep and goats sold daily in the markets of Burao and Yirowe, many of whom shipped to Gulf states via the port of Berbera. The market handles livestock from all over the Horn of Africa.

Agriculture is generally considered to be a potentially successful industry, especially in the production of cereals and horticulture. Mining also has potential, though simple quarrying represents the extent of current operations, despite the presence of diverse quantities of mineral deposits.

== Tourism ==
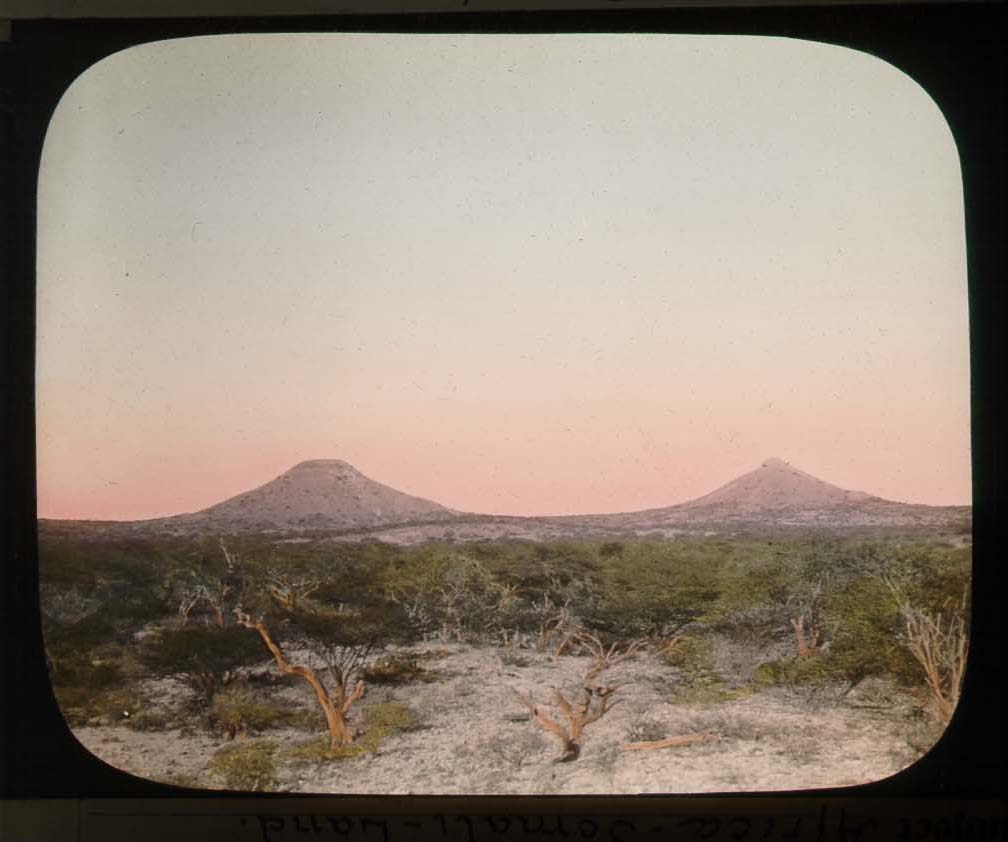
Naasa Hablood in 1896.

The rock art and caves at Laas Geel, situated on the outskirts of Hargeisa, are a popular local tourist attraction. Totaling ten caves, they were discovered by a French archaeological team in 2002 and are believed to date back around 5,000 years. The government and locals keep the cave paintings safe and only a restricted number of tourists are allowed entry. Other notable sights include the Freedom Arch in Hargeisa and the War Memorial in the city centre. Natural attractions are very common around the region. The Naasa Hablood are twin hills located on the outskirts of Hargeisa that Somalis in the region consider to be a majestic natural landmark.

The Ministry of Commerce, Industries and Tourism has also encouraged travellers to visit historic towns and cities in Somaliland. The historic town of Sheikh is located near Berbera and is home to old British colonial buildings that have remained untouched for over forty years. Berbera also houses historic and impressive Ottoman architectural buildings. Another equally famous historic city is Zeila. Zeila was once part of the Ottoman Empire, a dependency of Yemen and Egypt and a major trade city during the 19th century. The city has been visited for its old colonial landmarks, offshore mangroves and coral reefs, towering cliffs, and beach. The nomadic culture of Somaliland has also attracted tourists. Most nomads live in the countryside.

== Transport ==
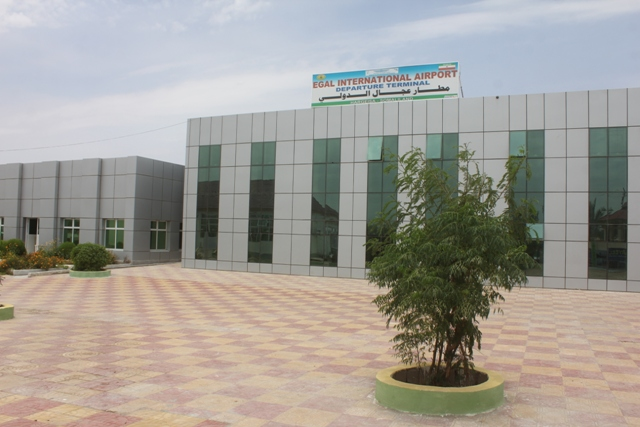
The Hargeisa International Airport in Hargeisa. in 2026 Maharat investment company from United Arab emirates was awarded a 70 million contract to build a new airport with 2 floors and 2 terminals.

Bus services operate in Hargeisa, Burao, Gabiley, Berbera and Borama, Erigavo and Lasanod. There are also road transportation services between the major towns and adjacent villages, which are operated by different types of vehicles. Among these are taxis, four-wheel drives, minibuses and light goods vehicles (LGV).

The most prominent airlines serving Somaliland is Daallo Airlines, a Somali-owned private carrier with regular international flights that emerged after Somali Airlines ceased operations. African Express Airways and Ethiopian Airlines also fly from airports in Somaliland to Djibouti City, Addis Ababa, Dubai and Jeddah, and offer flights for the Hajj and Umrah pilgrimages via the Egal International Airport in Hargeisa. Other major airports in the country include the Berbera Airport.

New Rail line linking Ethiopia and Somaliland Berbera Regions with Locomotive Cabotage in Somaliland, and exports towards Ethiopia as alternative cargo route other than Djibouti, media sources such as Horn daily state a rail line between Berbera and Addis Ababa is in the planning That would cost around 1.5 Bn Dollars and would Pass between Hargeisa Addis Ababa and Berbera .

== Ports ==
In June 2016, the Somaliland government signed an agreement with DP World to manage the strategic port of Berbera with the aim of enhancing productive capacity and acting as an alternative port for landlocked Ethiopia. In 2021 the project was joined by the UK government's CDC Group which has doubled the funding, making Berbera a $1 billion investment.

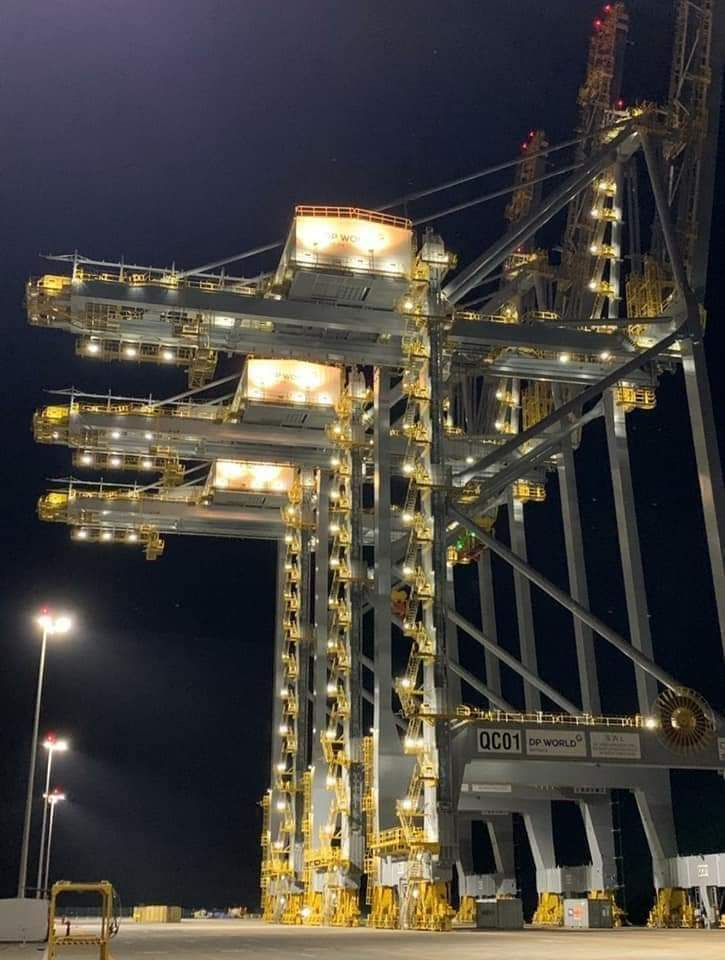
The Port of Berbera.

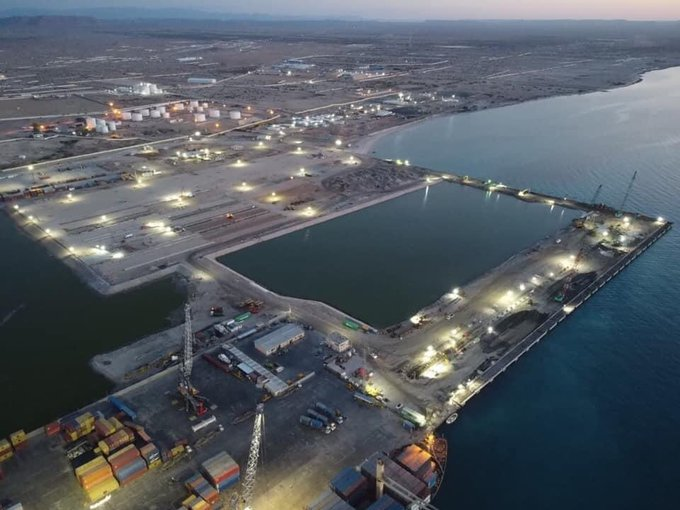
New DP World Berbera Container Terminal Port.

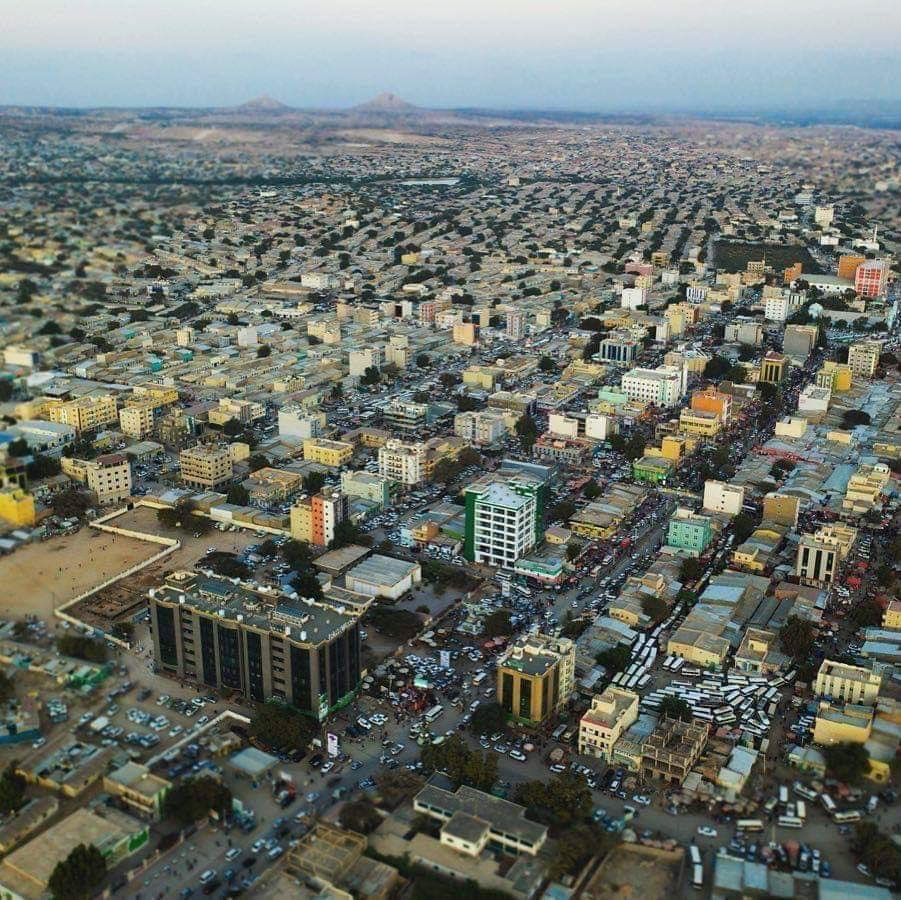
Cargo Hub Hargeisa.

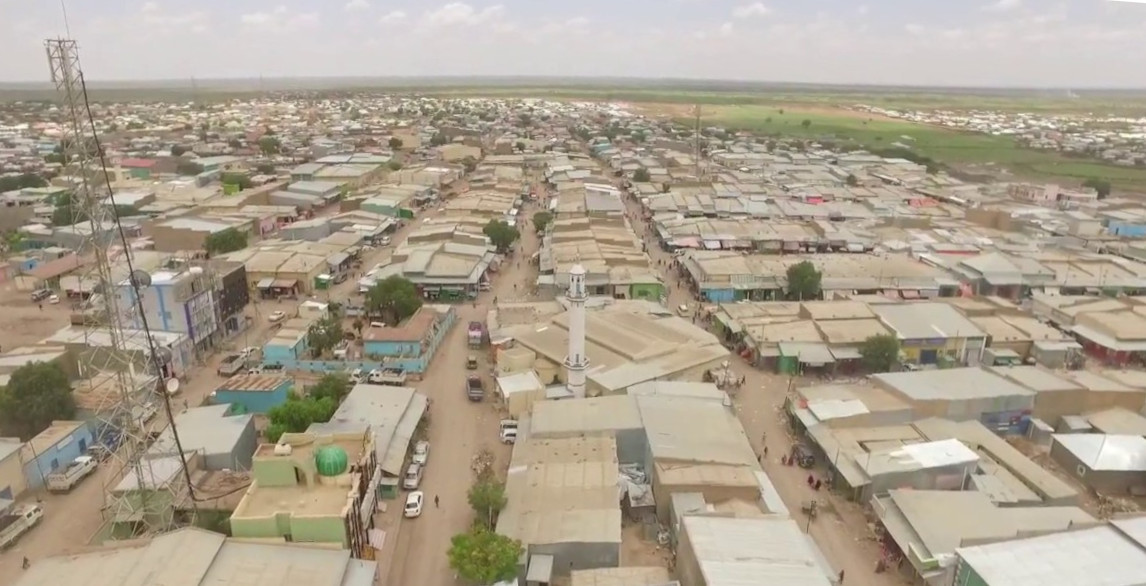
Wajaale,area Has Somaliland western Dry Port Tog Wajaale with cargo from DP world and exports towards Ethiopia , other dry ports include Hargesia the Captial and Gambadhe in the east

== Oil explorations ==
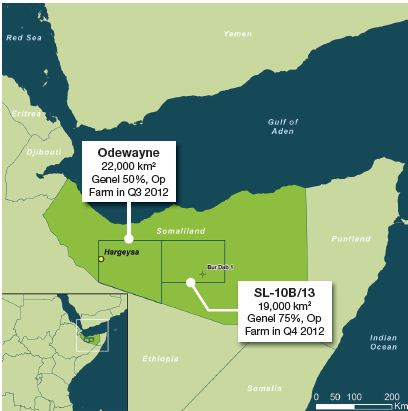
Somaliland with Genel and CPC Taiwan that began in 2012 and the Toosan well 1 , Somaliland estimates are around 30 Bn Barrels of crude oil, Toosan Drills to start in 2024 H1, Odwayne, Togdheer region. Somaliland plans around 16 Wells in Sl10 And SL13, Bahadhamal oil Discovery and major oil seeps visible in 2023, oil find in Bahadhamal proved Somaliland oil presence. Somaliland attended the Saipec Africa meetings and Plans major wells in Toosan and SL10-Sl13 in 2024

In August 2012, the Somaliland government awarded Genel Energy license to explore oil within its territory. Results of a surface seep study completed early in 2015 confirmed the outstanding potential offered in SL-10B and SL-13 block and Oodweyne block with estimated oil reserves of 1 billion barrel each. Genel Energy is set to drill exploration well for SL-10B and SL-13 block in Buur-Dhaab 20 kilometers northwest of Aynabo by the end of 2018. Somaliland Toosan Well 1 Drills in Place in 2025 after successful seismic data Toosan Oil estimates around 700 Million barrels of Crude.

16 Wells are planned in toosan region with exports towards CPC Taiwan Corporation and may join Opec Cartel and Africa Oil Hubs Such as Appo.after Toosan Well 1

== See also ==
- Agriculture in Somaliland
- Ministry of Finance (Somaliland)
- Ministry of Investment Promotion (Somaliland)
