= Somali shilling =

Currency of Somalia

Shilin Soomaali (Somali); الشلن الصومالي (Arabic)
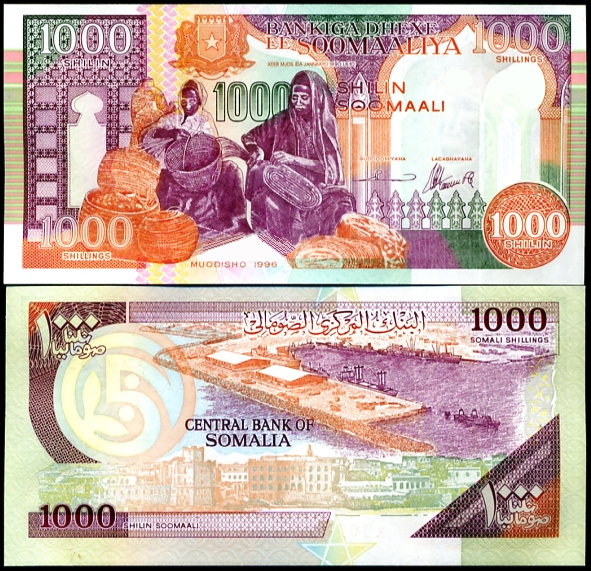
- 1000 Somali shilling banknote.

ISO 4217
- Code: SOS (numeric: 706)
- Subunit: 0.01

Unit
- Symbol: Sh.So.

Denominations
- Subunit
- 1/100: Senti, cents or centesimi
- Banknotes: 5, 10, 20, 50, 100, 500, 1000, 5000, 10,000 shillings
- Coins: 5, 10, 50 cents, 1 shilling

Demographics
- User(s): Somalia

Issuance
- Central bank: Central Bank of Somalia
- Website: www.centralbank.gov.so

The Somali shilling (sign: Sh.So.; Somali: shilin; Arabic: شلن; Italian: scellino; ISO 4217: SOS) is the official currency of Somalia. It is subdivided into 100 senti (Somali, also سنت), cents (English) or centesimi (Italian).

== Overview ==
=== Early history ===
The shilling has been the currency of parts of Somalia since 1921, when the East African shilling was introduced to the former British Somaliland protectorate. Following the 1960 independence and unification of the former territories of British Somaliland and Italian Somaliland, their respective currencies, the East African shilling and somalo (which were equal in value) were replaced at par in 1962 by the Somali shilling. Names used for its denominations were cent (singular: centesimo; plural: centesimi) and سنت (plural: سنتيمات), along with shilling (singular: scellino; plural: scellini).

=== Banknotes ===
On 15 October 1962, the Banca Nazionale Somala (National Bank of Somalia) issued notes denominated as 5, 10, 20 and 100 scellini/shillings. In 1975, the Bankiga Qaranka Soomaaliyeed (Somali National Bank) introduced notes for 5, 10, 20 and 100 shilin/shillings. These were followed in 1978 by notes of the same denominations issued by the Bankiga Dhexe Ee Soomaaliya (Central Bank of Somalia). 50 shilin/shillings notes were introduced in 1983, followed by 500 shilin/shillings in 1989 and 1000 shilin/shillings in 1990. An attempt was made in 1990 to reform the currency at 100 to 1, with new banknotes of 20 and 50 new shilin prepared for the redenomination.

Banknotes of the Somali shilling (1983-1996 issue)
Image	Value	Obverse	Reverse
	5 Somali shillings/Shilin Soomaali	Water buffaloes	Banana plantation
	10 Somali shillings/Shilin Soomaali	Abdul Aziz Mosque, Mogadishu	Boat building
	20 Somali shillings/Shilin Soomaali	Bankiga Dhexe ee Soomaaliya (Central Bank of Somalia) Building, Mogadishu	Cattle
	50 Somali shillings/Shilin Soomaali	Ruins of Xamar Weyne, Old Mogadishu	Watering animals
	100 Somali shillings/Shilin Soomaali	A woman with a baby waving a rifle, shovel and a rake; "Muuqaalka Dhagaxtuur" (stone thrower) monument, Mogadishu	Agricultural product processing factory
	500 Somali shillings/Shilin Soomaali	Fishermen	Mosque of Islamic Solidarity, Mogadishu
	1000 Somali shillings/Shilin Soomaali	Basket weavers	Port and waterfront of Mogadishu

Banknotes of the Somali shilling (1991 Currency Reform issue)
Image	Value	Obverse	Reverse
	20 New Somali shillings/N-Shilin Soomaali	Trader and a camel	Cotton harvest
	50 New Somali shillings/N-Shilin Soomaali	Weaver	Man with children on a donkey

Printed in Sudan in 2010 never issued.

Banknotes of the Somali shilling (2010 issue, printed in Sudan)
Image	Value	Obverse	Reverse
	1,000 Somali shillings/Shilin Soomaali	four camels grazing in field	three goats and bull standing in field
	2,000 Somali shillings/Shilin Soomaali	river scene	banana trees
	10,000 Somali shillings/Shilin Soomaali	dhow on calm waters	Three fish, coat of arms
	20,000 Somali shillings/Shilin Soomaali	National Theatre, Mogadiscio	Central Bank of Somalia, Mogadiscio
	50,000 Somali shillings/Shilin Soomaali	Mosque of Islamic Solidarity, Mogadishu	Minaret of Abdul Aziz Mosque in Mogadishu, coat of arms

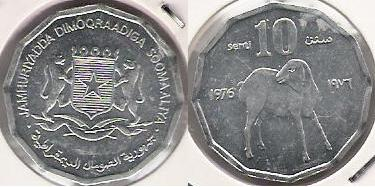
A 10 senti coin, issued in 1976.

=== Coins ===
Initially, the coins in circulation were those of the East African shilling and somalo currencies. In 1967, coins were issued in the name of the Somali Republic in denominations of 5, 10 and 50 cents/centesimi and 1 shilling/scellino. In 1976, when Somali names for the denominations were introduced, coins were issued in the name of the Somali Democratic Republic for 5, 10 and 50 senti and 1 shilling.

== Modern history ==
=== Pre-civil war ===
The shilling was pegged to sterling at a rate of 20 shillings to one pound sterling, making the Somali shilling equivalent to the British shilling. In 1967, it switched its peg to the U.S. dollar on 18 November 1967, when sterling was devalued, giving an implied exchange rate of 1 dollar = 7.14286 shillings. On 28 August 1971, with the collapse of the Bretton Woods system, the shilling was valued at 0.124414 grams of gold. On 23 December 1971, it was repegged to the U.S. dollar, this time at a rate of 1 dollar = 6.57895 shillings. The shilling was devalued by 5% to 1 dollar = 6.92522 shillings on 8 January 1972. On 24 February 1973, the peg to the dollar became 6.23272 shillings.

A dual rate system was established on 30 June 1981, with an official rate of 6.295 shillings to the U.S. dollar and a second exchange rate of 12.4654 to 12.7146 shillings to the dollar. U.S. dollars in the black market usually traded at a premium to the official exchange rate.

Somali currency underwent several devaluations:

- 1 July 1982: Peg with the SDR = 16.50 shillings (±7.5 band on 1 July 1983)
- 15 September 1984: Peg with the USD = 26 shillings (official rate)
- 1 January 1985: Peg with the USD = 36 shillings (official rate)
- 30 June 1985: Peg with the USD = 40.6083 shillings (official rate)
- 2 November 1985: Peg with the USD = 42.50 shillings (official rate)
- Somali shilling was devalued from 54.50 SOS/USD to 90.50 SOS/USD during 1986. There were multiple exchange rates.
- 12 October 1987: Peg with the USD = 100 shillings (official rate)
- By 29 December 1989, a U.S. dollar was exchanged for 924 shillings, in which it skyrocketed to 3,470 shillings by the end of 1990.

=== Deregulation ===
Following the breakdown in central authority that accompanied the civil war beginning in the early 1990s, the value of the Somali shilling plunged. The Central Bank of Somalia, the nation's monetary authority, also shut down operations. Rival producers of the local currency, including autonomous regional entities such as the Puntland territory, subsequently emerged. These currencies included the Na shilling, which failed to gain widespread acceptance, and the Balweyn I and II, forgeries of pre-1991 bank notes. Competition for seigniorage drove the value down to about $0.04 per ShSo (1000) note, approximately the commodity cost. Consumers also refused to accept bills larger than the 1991 denominations, which helped to stop devaluation from spiraling further upwards. The pre-1991 notes and subsequent forgeries were treated as the same currency. It took large bundles to make cash purchases, and the United States dollar was often used for larger transactions.

=== Regulation ===
In the late 2000s, Somalia's newly established Transitional Federal Government revived the defunct Central Bank of Somalia. The monetary authority assumed the task of both formulating and implementing monetary policy. Owing to a lack of confidence in the Somali shilling, the U.S. dollar was widely accepted as a medium of exchange alongside the Somali shilling. Dollarization notwithstanding, the large issuance of the Somali shilling increasingly fueled price hikes, especially for low-value transactions. The new Central Bank of Somalia expects this inflationary environment to come to an end as soon as the Central Bank assumes full control of monetary policy and replaces the presently circulating currency introduced by the private sector.

With a significant improvement in local security, Somali expatriates began returning to the country for investment opportunities. Coupled with modest foreign investment, the inflow of funds helped the Somali shilling increase considerably in value. By March 2014, the currency had appreciated by almost 60% against the U.S. dollar over the previous 12 months. The Somali shilling was the strongest among the 175 global currencies traded by Bloomberg, rising close to 50 percentage points higher than the next most robust global currency over the same period.

The United States dollar is still the main currency used in Somalia, with it being most prolific in electronic payments using SMS like EVC Plus.

In April 2026, led by a small initial group of traders in the capital Mogadishu, many businesses and shops stopped accepting shillings due to them being in very poor quality due to their age. This led to an immediate rise in prices in everyday expenses, such as groceries, medicines and public transport. Many people adopted mobile phone payments as a replacement.

== Historical exchange rates ==
Free-market rates in Somalia:

- 7 SOS/USD in 1970
- 30 SOS/USD in 1980
- 100 SOS/USD in 1985
- 2,000 SOS/USD in June 1991
- 5,000 SOS/USD in June 1993
- 13,400 SOS/USD in March 2006
- 14,406 SOS/USD in August 2006
- 15,000 SOS/USD in February 2007
- 25,000 SOS/USD in March 2008
- 35,000 SOS/USD in July 2008
- 28,250 SOS/USD in March 2009
- 33,300 SOS/USD in February 2010
- 27,000 SOS/USD in October 2011
- 19,000 SOS/USD in December 2012
- 15,000 SOS/USD in May 2013
- 20,000 SOS/USD in March 2014
- 22,000 SOS/USD in December 2014
- 23,000 SOS/USD in April 2015
- 26,000 SOS/USD in May 2025

Current SOS exchange rates
From Google Finance:	AUD CAD CHF CNY EUR GBP HKD JPY USD ZAR
From Yahoo! Finance:	AUD CAD CHF CNY EUR GBP HKD JPY USD ZAR
From XE.com:	AUD CAD CHF CNY EUR GBP HKD JPY USD ZAR
From OANDA:	AUD CAD CHF CNY EUR GBP HKD JPY USD ZAR

== See also ==
- Economy of Somalia
- British currency in the Middle East
- Somaliland shilling
- East African Shilling
- Somalo

== Notes ==
Preceded by: Trust Territory of Somaliland somalo Location: Trust Territory of Somaliland; Reason: independence and merging of British Somaliland and Italian Somaliland; Ratio: at par	Currency of Somalia; 1962 – 1991; Note: the shilling was made the unit of account shortly after independence in 1960	Currency of Somalia; 1991 –	Succeeded by: Current
Preceded by: East African shilling Location: British Somaliland; Reason: independence and merging of British Somaliland and Italian Somaliland; Ratio: at par	Currency of Somalia; 1962 – 1991; Note: the shilling was made the unit of account shortly after independence in 1960	Currency of Somaliland; 1991 – 1994	Succeeded by: Somaliland shilling Reason: currency independence Ratio: 1 Somaliland shilling = 100 Somali shillings = 1/50 United States dollar Note: Somaliland is not internationally recognized
