= Somalo =

Currency of the Trust Territory of Somaliland

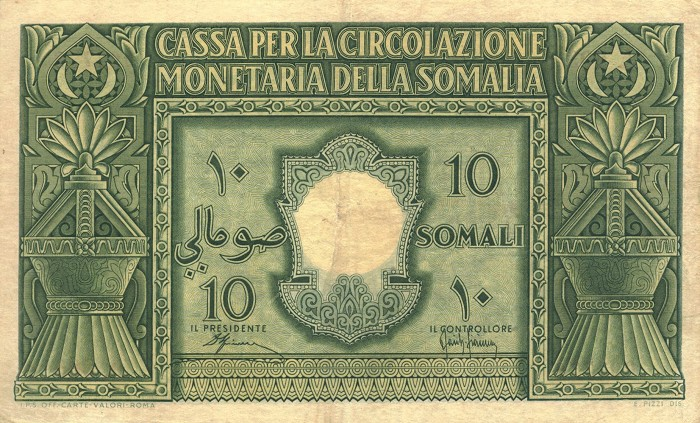
A 10 "Somali" banknote of 1950

The Somalo (plural: Somali, صومالي) was the currency of the Trust Territory of Somaliland administered by Italy between 1950 and 1960. The "Somalo" remained officially in use in the newly created Somali Republic until 1962. It was subdivided into 100 centesimi (singular: centesimo).

== History ==
On 27 January 1950, Italy was given financial administration of the Territory (of former Italian Somalia). As early as 1948 Italy had been considering the options for currencies in Somalia, in anticipation that the territory would be returned to its control. After rejecting the idea of re-introducing the Italian lira, or a currency linked to the lira, it was decided to introduce a new currency. The new currency was denominated the ‘Somalo’ and it was authorized by the Trusteeship Administration's Ordinance No.14 of 16 May 1950. The Somalo was valued at 0.124414 grammes of fine gold and was, significantly, the same value as the East African shilling. By making the Somalo equivalent to the East African shilling, it was anticipated that the transition to the new currency would be as painless as possible.In adopting the value of the East African shilling, it was also decided to utilize the same denominations in which the East African shillings were issued, although not all denominations issued by the East African Currency Board were adopted for the new currency. Notes were prepared in the denominations of 1, 5, 10, 20 and 100 Somali. (‘Somali’ being the plural of ‘Somalo’.) Coins were prepared in denominations of 1 Somalo, 50, 10, 5 and 1 "Centesimi". The designs for the notes and coins were detailed in Ordinances No.15 of 18 May 1950 and No.44 of 22 July 1950.Peter Symes.

The "Somalo" was authorized by Trusteeship Administration Ordinance No. 14 of 16 May 1950. A currency exchange was scheduled to last from 16 May until 22 July, but was eventually extended until 22 August. The somalo replaced the East African shilling at par and remained equal to it.

It replaced the small amount of Italian lire in circulation at 1 Somalo = L. 87.49. It was given an IMF parity of 124.414 mg fine gold, equal to one shilling sterling. Internationally, this currency became known as the Somali shilling when Somalia became independent on 1 July 1960.

The Somalo/shilling was replaced at par on 15 December 1962 (along with the East African shilling circulating in British Somaliland) by the scellino (Somali shilling).

Following independence in 1960, the somalo of Italian Somaliland and the East African shilling (which were equal in value) were replaced at par in 1962 by the Somali shilling. Names used for the denominations were cent (singular: centesimo; plural: centesimi) and سنت (plural: سنتيمات and سنتيما) together with shilling (singular: scellino; plural: scellini) and شلن.

== Coins ==
In 1950, coins were introduced in denominations of 1, 5, 10 and 50 centesimi and 1 somalo. The three lower denominations were minted in copper, with the higher two being struck in silver.

== Banknotes ==
The Cassa per la Circolazione Monetaria della Somalia, headquartered in Rome, began operations 18 April 1950 and was authorized to issue 55 million shillings in paper money. It released notes in denominations of 1, 5, 10, 20 and 100 Somali on 22 May 1950. The banknotes were written in Italian and Arabic languages.

A smaller version of the 5-Somali note was put into circulation in May 1951. These notes were withdrawn beginning 15 December 1962 and ceased to be legal tender on 31 December 1963.

== Bibliography ==
- Krause, Chester L.; Clifford Mishler (1991). Standard Catalog of World Coins: 1801–1991 (18th ed.). Krause Publications. ISBN 0873411501.
- Pick, Albert (1994). Bruce, Colin R. II; Shafer, Neil (eds.). Standard Catalog of World Paper Money: General Issues (7th ed.). Krause Publications. ISBN 0-87341-207-9.

Preceded by: East African shilling Ratio: at par	Currency of Trust Territory of Somaliland; 1950 – 1962	Succeeded by: Somali shilling Reason: independence Ratio: at par Note: the shilling was made the unit of account shortly after independence in 1960
