= Somali goat =

Somali breed of goat

Somali
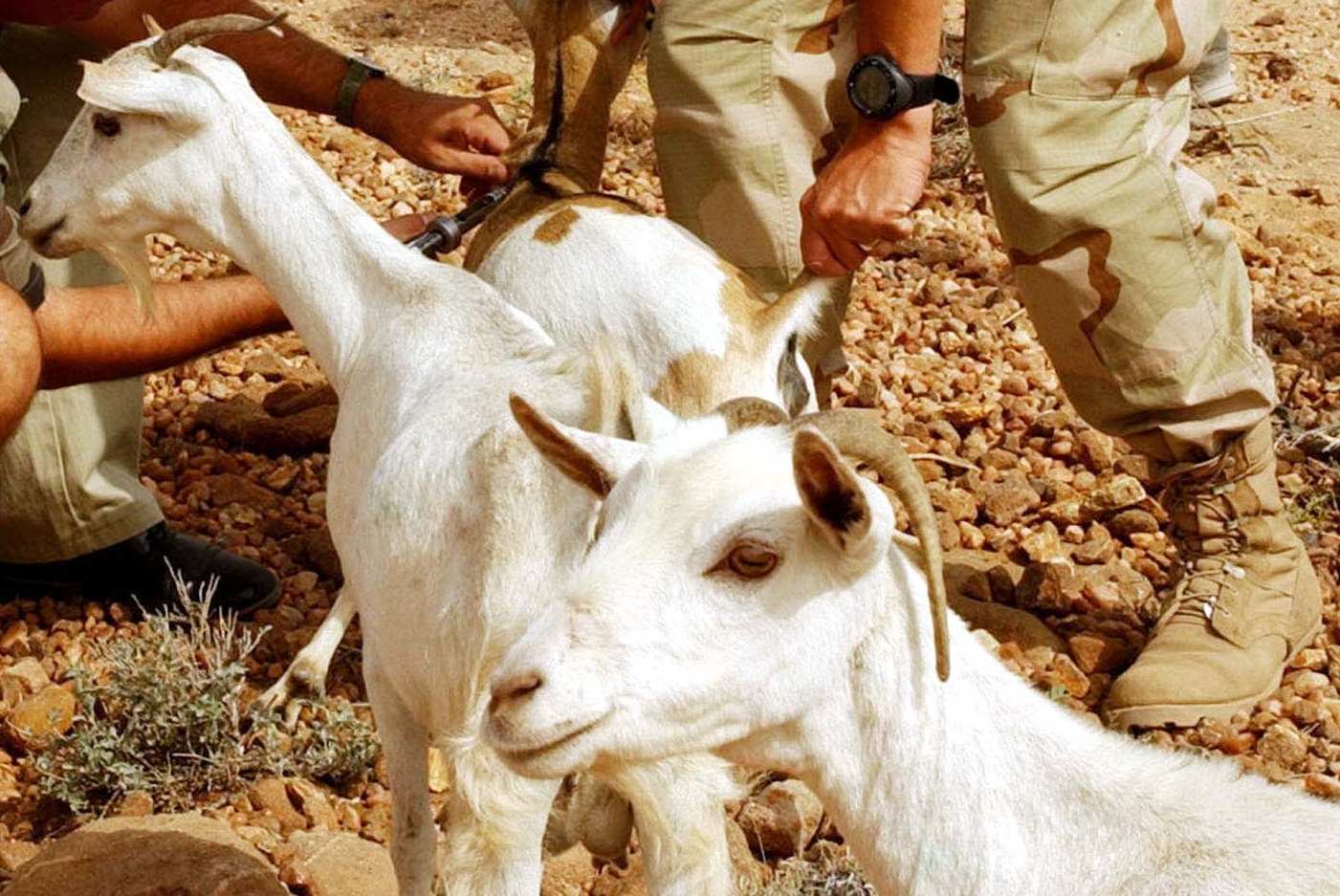

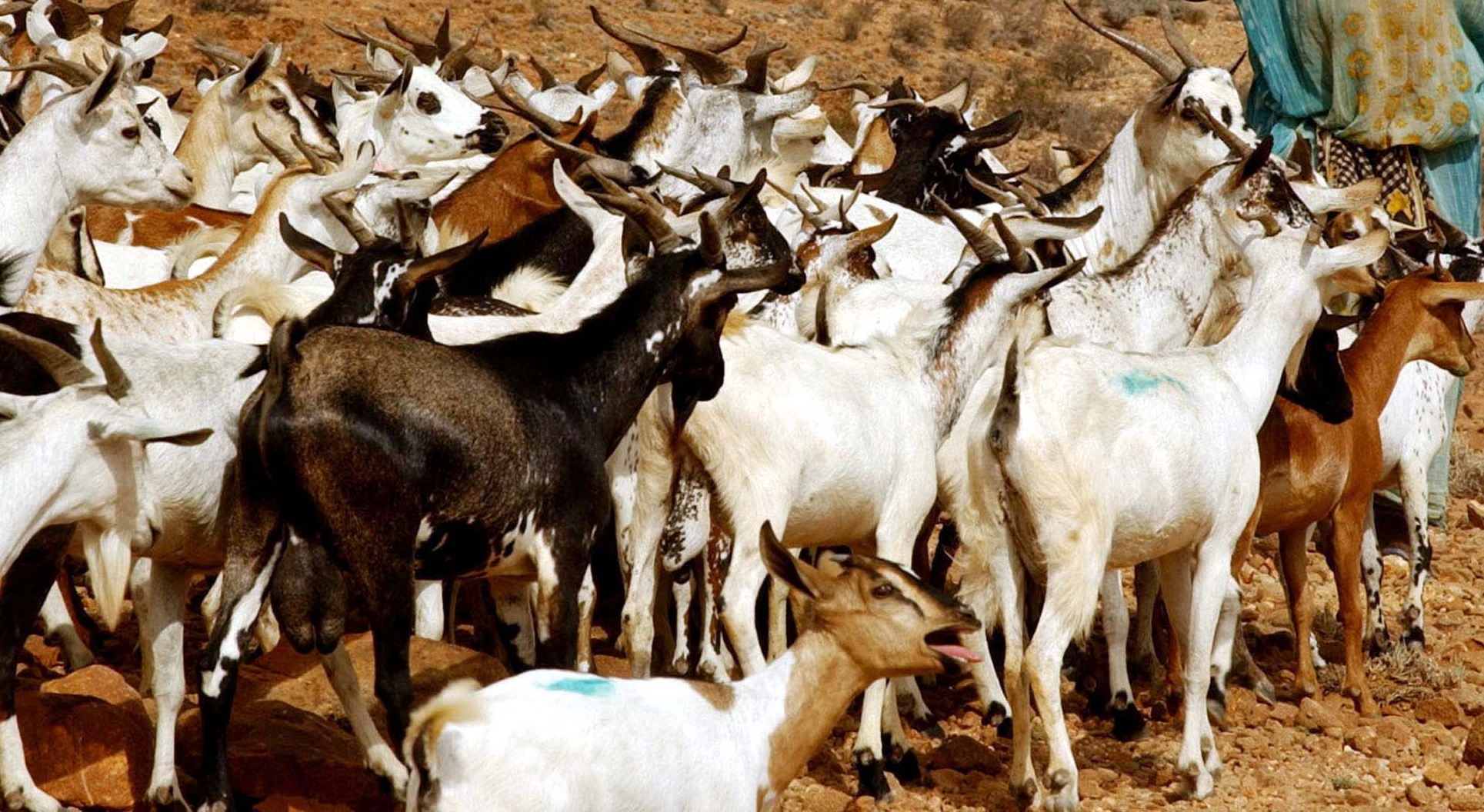
- Images from Ali Sabieh, Djibouti
- Conservation status: FAO (2007): no data; DAD-IS (2026): unknown
- Other names: Abgal; Benadir; Bimal; Boran; Boran Somali; Deghier; Deghiyer; Degyer; Denghier; Dighi yer; Dighier; Digodi; Galla; Gigwain; Habab; Issa-Somali; Large-White Somali; Maria; Melebo; Modugh; Mudugh; Ogaden
- Distribution: Djibouti; Eritrea; Ethiopia; Kenya; Somalia
- Use: meat; milk; skins

Traits
- Goat; Capra aegagrus hircus

The Somali is a Somali breed or group of breeds of domestic goat. It is distributed in Somalia, Djibouti, Eritrea, Ethiopia and north-eastern Kenya. It is used primarily for the production of meat. The animals have short ears and hair, usually white but sometimes with spots or patches. Both males and females typically have horns. The goats are drought tolerant and, when milked, can each yield one to three kilograms of milk daily, even when access to water is limited.

The Somali is reported to DAD-IS by three countries: Kenya, Somalia and Yemen; no population data is reported by any of the three, so the conservation status of the breed is unknown.
