= Trust Territory of Somaliland =

UN trust territory (1949–1960)

Trust Territory of Somaliland under Italian Administration Amministrazione fiduciaria italiana della Somalia (Italian) Dhulka Soomaaliyeed oo hoos yimaada Maamulka Talyaaniga (Somali) إقليم صوماليلاند تحت الوصاية للإدارة الإيطالية (Arabic) 'Iiqlim sumaliland taht al-wisayat lil'iidarat al'iitalia
- 1950–1960
- Flag Coat of arms (1950‍–‍1956)

- Location of the Trust Territory of Somaliland.
- Status: United Nations Trust Territory under the administration of Italy
- Capital: Mogadishu
- Common languages: Italian (official) · Somali · Arabic
- Religion: Islam
- Demonym: Somali
- Administrator
  - 1950–1953: Giovanni Fornari
  - 1953–1957: Enrico Martino
  - 1957–1958: Enrico Anzillotti
  - 1958–1960: Mario di Stefano
- Prime Minister
  - 1956–1960: Abdullahi Issa
- Historical era: Cold War
  - Established: 1 April 1950
  - Independence: 1 July 1960
- Currency: somalo
Preceded by	Succeeded by
British Military Administration (Somaliland)	Somali Republic
- Today part of: Somalia

The Trust Territory of Somaliland, officially the Trust Territory of Somaliland under Italian Administration (Italian: Amministrazione fiduciaria italiana della Somalia), was a United Nations Trust Territory from 1950 to 1960, following the dissolution of the former British Military Administration. It was administered by Italy before gaining independence. It covered most of present-day Somalia and its capital was Mogadishu.

== Background ==
In 1941, Italian Somaliland was occupied by British and South African troops as part of the East African Campaign of World War II. The British continued to administer the area until 1 April 1950. On that date, former Italian Somaliland was made a Trust Territory, as stipulated by United Nations General Assembly Resolution 289 of 21 November 1949.

=== Return to Italian control ===
The Somali Youth League (the main force in the country driving for independence) fiercely opposed the transfer of Somalia back to Italian control and accused Britain of bartering with the country in order to appease Italy. Of all of Italy's demands to manage its former colonies under Trusteeships, only the former Italian Somaliland was accepted. This was also the only case of a trusteeship being assigned to a defeated Second World War power.

Advocating for the trusteeship on behalf of the U.S. government, American ambassador Philip Jessup argued that because the Somali were largely pastoral, "We can hardly expect these people to be in a position to determine for themselves what means might best assure their achievement of self government and independence..." Various member states of the United Nations pushed back against the planned 10 years of trusteeship, with Poland proposing a reduction to 3 years and Ethiopia voting against the trusteeship entirely. Ethiopian Emperor Haile Selassie expressed a keen interest in the territory, which his government deemed a 'lost province'. The Ethiopian Empire claimed Banaadir, which encompasses Mogadishu, as well as the adjacent Indian Ocean coastline, rightfully belonged to it based on 'historical grounds'. Ethiopia submitted a memorandum to the UN, contending that prior to the era of European colonialism, their empire had encompassed all of the former Italian Somaliland.

The decision to put Somalia back under the control of its former colonial ruler was highly controversial as Somalis widely felt that the Trust Territory was being established for Italian interests.

==== Somali Youth League reaction ====
Before the Italians returned to Somalia, the Somali Youth League held a major summit in order to formulate a common policy and unified attitude toward the Trusteeship government. It was initially decided to launch an armed resistance, but after serious deliberation the league came to the conclusion that a more temperate course would be better for Somali citizens. Following the summit's conclusion the SYL delivered a paper to the chief Italian administrator explaining its position. The League informed the administration that it would continue to agitate for independence and expressed hope that the new government would not resist SYL efforts. It was made clear that the organization was willing to cooperate with the Trusteeship authorities if they reciprocated. The League demanded that Arabic be made the official language of the Trusteeship instead of Italian and further requested that Italian government not bring back officials from the fascist era.

=== Formation of Trusteeship administration ===
Italy did not possess the financial resources to administer the territory effectively as the Italian economy had largely collapsed in the wake of WWII. It was receiving aid from the Marshall Plan itself and as a result formed the administration of the Trusteeship with an inadequate budget.

Most of the Italian officials selected to run the administration were members of the old Ministry of Colonial Affairs, arousing resentment and alarm in Somalia and neighbouring Ethiopia. Most concerning to many people was the reappointment of former fascist Governor Copasso of Upper Jubba to the same position he had held in the colonial era. The Trust Territory was widely believed to have been a haven for fascists fleeing post war persecution in Italy.

In an attempt to mollify Somali fears, an advisory council was created composed of an Egyptian, Colombian and Filipino representative who would report to the Trusteeship Council of the United Nations on developments in the territory. Many Somalis who lived through the League of Nations mandate era believed the Colombian and Filipino representatives were going along or outright working with Italian interests. The Egyptian representative was by contrast viewed positively for clashing with his colleagues over the Trusteeship's conduct.

==== Currency ====
The currency of the Trusteeship was the Somalo. It was coined by the Bank of Italy for the Cassa per la Circolazione Monetaria della Somalia (the Trusteeship's central bank). The Somalo was replaced in 1962 with the Somali shilling.

==== Language ====
Italian was chosen as the primary official language during the mandate, though Somali was also an official language. Arabic was also widely spoken. Somali was then written using an Arabic script, not adopting the Latin script until 1972.

== History ==
On 1 April 1950, the Amministrazione fiduciaria italiana della Somalia (AFIS) began its rule. A deployment of 6,500 troops landed in Somalia to assist the establishment of AFIS under the leadership of Giovanni Fornari. Fornari's three year tenure would mark the most difficult years of the Trusteeship. Professor I.M. Lewis maintained that to Somalis, the large Italian army presence deployed at the start of the mandate, "...gave the handover much the character of a military occupation."

=== Fornari Administration (1950–1953) ===
According to Italian journalist and historian Angelo Del Boca in report for Corriere della Sera, almost all officials Italy had chosen to govern AFIS were from "colonial-fascist" backgrounds. Giacomo Bona, the local secretary of the Christian Democrats in Mogadishu, warned party headquarters in Rome that there had been large resurgence in fascism in Somalia following the creation of the Trust Territory. The Somali Youth League (SYL) publicly decried the Trusteeship government as being "infested with fascists" and further charged that AFIS was providing those fleeing post-war persecution with a veneer of legitimacy. The newly appointed Governor Copasso, a former fascist administrator in Italian Somaliand, actively sought to delegitimize and discredit the Somali Youth League in an attempt to extend Italian rule from 10 to 30 years. The large fascist presence in AFIS led to the government being popularly referred to as Ancora Fascisti Italiani in Somalia (Still Italian fascists in Somalia).

The first half of AFIS's decade-long rule would be marked by animosity and conflict between the Italian authorities and the Somali Youth League. Numerous SYL officials who had gained positions of prominence during the era of British Military Administration were either demoted, removed from their positions or imprisoned by Italians officials. These attempts to marginalize the league would lead to demonstrations across the country which were strongly repressed by the government, who had at the time come to decision not cooperate or concede to the SYL's plans. Abdirazak Haji Hussein, future prime minister of the Somali Republic, would be severely beaten and arrested by Italian authorities in 1950. Due to the heavy handed and militaristic conduct of AFIS, the SYL would widely come to regard the body as an occupying force. Somali Youth League member Abdulahi Issa, future prime minister of the territory, would argue that the presence of Somalia's former colonial ruler was one of the main obstacle to democratic and peaceful development.

Already underfunded, the AFIS budget was reduced by 25% in 1951. Giovanni Fornari, head of AFIS, would protest to Rome that the cut threatened AFIS's ability to function. Due to fiscal pressures, the size of the Italian military contingent deployed to Somalia was rapidly reduced in size in 1951 and 1952. According to Italian politician and journalist Ernesto Rossi, the salaries and privileges afforded to fascist employees of the Trusteeship administration were exorbitantly high and consequently strongly effected the annual budget.

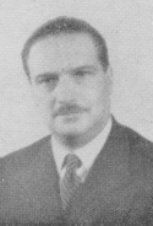
2nd AFIS head Enrico Martino

=== Transfer to Martino Administration (1953) ===
Early in 1953 Giovanni Fornari left office and was replaced by Enrico Martino. Martino was given four directives to follow by the Ministry of Foreign Affairs:

1. To prepare for independence by formulating a policy that would attract the cooperation of the Somali Youth League with AFIS, as it was becoming clear that the organization was the most popular in the nation and marginalizing it was impossible. With the SYL now being the likeliest future government, severe friction with the party would threaten post-independence Italo-Somali relations.
2. Govern with the knowledge that the mandate deadline of 1960 was to be respected
3. Ease tensions between Italian and Somali communities
4. To improve the Somali economic situation

That year, Martino began preparing for the first democratic elections by ordering a census. A 1953 report commissioned by the Italian Ministry of Foreign Affairs would warn the AFIS was creating a precarious situation in Somalia by making the economy entirely reliant on Banana exports. The exceptionally high profits from bananas would deter Italian authorities from the development of other crops.

In 1954, the Italian government established post-secondary institutions of law, economics, and social studies in Mogadishu, the territory's capital. These institutions were satellites of the University of Rome, which provided all the instruction material, faculty and administration.

The advisory council setup by the UN would become the scene of an intense rivalry between the Italians and Egyptians. Egypt considered Somalia as more rightfully in its sphere of influence compared to the Italians due to historical, cultural and geographic ties, a stance that would remain unchanged during the dramatic transition from the rule of King Farouk to the 1952 Egyptian revolution. The Egyptian member of the council, Muhammad Kamal Addin Salah, was widely popular with Somalis for sharply criticizing AFIS policies. In 1957, he was assassinated by a Somali gunman, who was rumoured to have been later silenced by Italian authorities via lethal injection.

=== First elections and détente (1954) ===
In 1954, the first municipal elections were held across the territory. The Somali Youth League would achieve a decisive victory, proving itself the most popular party across the nation. As a consequence of the election both the Italian administration and the SYL had a change of attitude towards one another. AFIS had fully come to recognize that it needed the support of the SYL to govern while the SYL recognized it needed to be on good terms with the international recognized administration to strengthen its position.

Florentine Enrico Anzilotti, an Italian diplomat with AFIS, has been credited with helping patch the divide between the SYL and the authorities during this period in order to prepare for independence. Though Anzilotti achieved much success during this period, he was constantly opposed by other Italian officials, particularly with the General Secretary of AFIS, Piero Franca. This was the first time the Somali nationalist movement was being offered a peaceful transfer of power, and consequently, Anzilotti's new approach would start a fierce debate within the league over how to deal with AFIS. The contention was centred around the "moderate" and "radical" wings of the SYL. The moderates believed that with only five years remaining until independence, it would make more sense for the SYL to take the opportunity to work with the Trust administration to build the foundations of the state. This was opposed by the radical faction who labelled supporters of the idea as Italian collaborators. Though Anzilotti was later forced to leave Somalia in 1958, his efforts have been credited by Somalis for creating the conditions necessary peaceful and democratic transfer of power. Consequently, he became the only Italian dignitary to receive the Somali Star (the nations highest award) following independence in 1960 and had a neighbourhood in Mogadishu named Quartiere Anzilotti in his honour.

Aden Abdulle Osman, head of the "moderate" faction, and the future first Somali president would be elected president of the SYL in 1954. During his leadership, an atmosphere of détente was created between the League and the Italians. For the first time, a direct line of communication was established between the SYL and the administration. Following this development, both side became more conciliatory. By the mid 1950s, relations between the Somali Youth League and Italian authorities had significantly improved, though relations remained tense in the years following.

By 1955, halfway through the mandate, little meaningful progress had been achieved towards the goal of self governance and independence.

=== Parliamentary elections and preparation for independence (1949–1959) ===
1956 saw "Somalization", the process of replacing all Italian government officials with Somalis, went into full swing as senior administrators began to be replaced. This development saw the creation of the legislative body of 70 seats, 10 of which were reserved for ethnic minorities. The assembly was given full power in domestic affairs, but the head of the Trust Administration held the right of absolute veto.

==== Formation of Somali Government ====
In 1956, the first general election was held, which the Somali Youth League would decisively win. Following the victory, the SYL was called upon to form a government. Abdulahi Issa would be selected as Somalia's first prime minister. Somali history textbooks note 1956 as the decisive year that Italian officials became interested in turning over governance to the Somali population. By the end of that year all districts and provinces in the mandate were under the direct authority of Somali administrators. Despite the lack of formal education, many Somali officials demonstrated a high standard of ability, particularly at the district level.

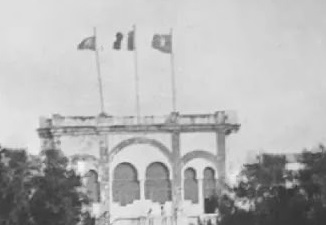
Mogadishu 1959 government building with three flags: Somali flag, UN flag, Italian flag

=== Independence and formation of the Somali Republic (1960) ===
In 1960, the Trust Territory of Somaliland (the former Italian Somaliland) became independent, following in the footsteps of the briefly extant State of Somaliland (the former British Somaliland) which had gained independence five days earlier, with Mohamed Haji Ibrahim Egal as Prime Minister on June 26, 1960. On July 1, 1960, the two territories united as planned to form the Somali Republic. A new government was formed with Haji Bashir Ismail Yusuf as the first President of the Somali National Assembly, Abdullahi Issa as Prime Minister, Aden Abdullah Osman Daar as President and Abdirashid Ali Shermarke as Prime Minister, later to become President (from 1967 to 1969).

It was believed that the trusteeship would give the population of the former Italian Somaliland the opportunity to gain more experience in political education and self-government in comparison to other African colonies. These were advantages that British Somaliland, which was to be incorporated into the new Somali state, did not have. Although in the 1950s British colonial officials attempted, through various development efforts, to make up for past neglect, the protectorate stagnated. The disparity between the two territories in economic development and political experience would cause serious difficulties when it came time to integrate the two parts.

== Achievements and Failures ==
=== Education ===
The most significant achievement of the Trusteeship was in the field of education. During Italian Colonial rule, the viceroy of Italian East Africa had declared that Somali were not allowed to attend school past the third grade and the British Military Administration that had followed had made no real effort in the field of education. Thus at the start of the Trusteeship in 1950 merely 2,000 Somalis were enrolled in schools across the entire territory.

Cooperation between the Italian authorities, the Somali Youth League and UNESCO had achieved significant progress in the field of education by replacing ex-colonial missionary schools with state funded public education. By 1957 over 30,000 Somalis were enrolled in schools. The Italian effort primarily focused on elementary schooling. Competition between Italy and Egypt in the field of education significantly aided this growth. Starting in 1950, the Egyptians had begun a serious effort by sending teachers and aiding the creation of Arabic schools. Due to the rivalry the school system became divided, with families and clans of pro-Italian orientation usually going to the Public schools and while pro-SYL ones went to the Arabic schools. To respond to the public demand for schooling in Arabic, Italian authorities imported teachers from Libya.

=== System of governance ===
Historian Angelo Del Boca noted that the system Italy had imposed on the Trusteeship was detached from the reality of how Somalia functioned and ended up reproducing the same bureaucratic deficiencies as the Italian system.

=== Economic Development ===
President Mohamed Siad Barre would lament to Italian journalists soon after coming to power that Italy had not developed anything outside of bananas.

== Organization ==
An Administrator, chosen from among career diplomats, represented the Italian Government. He, by decree of the Italian President, also held the functions of Commander of the Armed Forces in Somalia, made up of a Military Corps and a Police Corps: the AFIS Security Corps and the Somalia Carabinieri Group.

In 1956 there was a reorganization, with the creation of the Somali Army and the Somali Police Forces, where the former Zaptié who had fought alongside the Italians were also admitted.

== Anthem, flag and coat of arms ==
The Somali national anthem from 1950 to 1960 was "Il Canto degli Italiani" ("The Song of the Italians"), the same as the Italian metropole.

From 1 April 1950 to 21 October 1954, the Trusteeship used solely the flag of Italy. From 21 October until independence, the Italian flag was accompanied by that of the UN. On 1 July 1960, Independence Day of Somalia, the Italian and UN flags were lowered to the tune of Il Canto degli Italiani at the Governor's Palace in Mogadishu to symbolize the end of Italian control over the region.

The Italian coat of arms was solely used until 21 October 1954, when both the Italian and Somali coat of arms were used jointly. After independence, the Italian coat of arms ceased its official status.

== Legacy ==
=== Somalia ===
Somali diplomat and historian Ismail Ali Ismail writes:

"A strong, stable, and merit-based bureaucracy is the back bone of stable government. It is what enables a state to weather political storms; it is what keeps the ship of state afloat and prevents it from sinking when the sea of politics is rough. Italy itself woefully lacked such a bureaucracy. Its civil service was described as "overstaffed, underpaid, inefficient, and insubordinate." The Somalis say: "Ninkaad kabo ka tolanaysid kabihiisaa la' eegaa," which means, "Before you ask a cobbler to make you a pair of shoes, look at his own." Clearly, if one were shopping in those days—or even now— for a good system of governance or administration, one would not have gone to Italy. Italy simply could not have bequeathed to its Somaliland what it did not itself have."

=== Italy ===
Indro Montanelli, a defender of Italian colonial rule, wrote in the late 1990s that the ten years of Italian Trusteeship were the Golden age of Somalia. He claimed that the population nearly doubled, illiteracy was reduced by 60%, malnutrition in the rural areas disappeared, the economy soared to the same level of the most developed African countries and there was complete integration in religious and social-political matters between all Somalia inhabitants.

Ernesto Rossi, an Italian politician and journalist, would criticize the government of the defunct Trusteeship in a 1963 article writing, "The cadres of AFIS were filled with officials and employees who represented the cream of the fascists administration. Worse teachers of democracy could not have been found."

== See also ==
- Italian Somaliland
- British Somaliland
- Italian Somalis
- History of Somalia
