= Japanese government–issued dollar in Malaya and Borneo =

Form of Japanese currency

Unit
- Plural: dollars
- Symbol: $

Denominations
- Subunit
- 1/100: cent
- Plural
- cent: cents
- Banknotes: 1, 5, 10, 50 cents. 1, 5, 10, 100, 1000 dollars.

Demographics
- Date of introduction: 1942
- Date of withdrawal: 1945
- User(s): Federated Malay States; Johor; Straits Settlements; North Borneo; Kingdom of Sarawak; Brunei

Issuance
- Central bank: Bank of Japan

Valuation
- Pegged with: Japanese Yen
- This infobox shows the latest status before this currency was rendered obsolete.

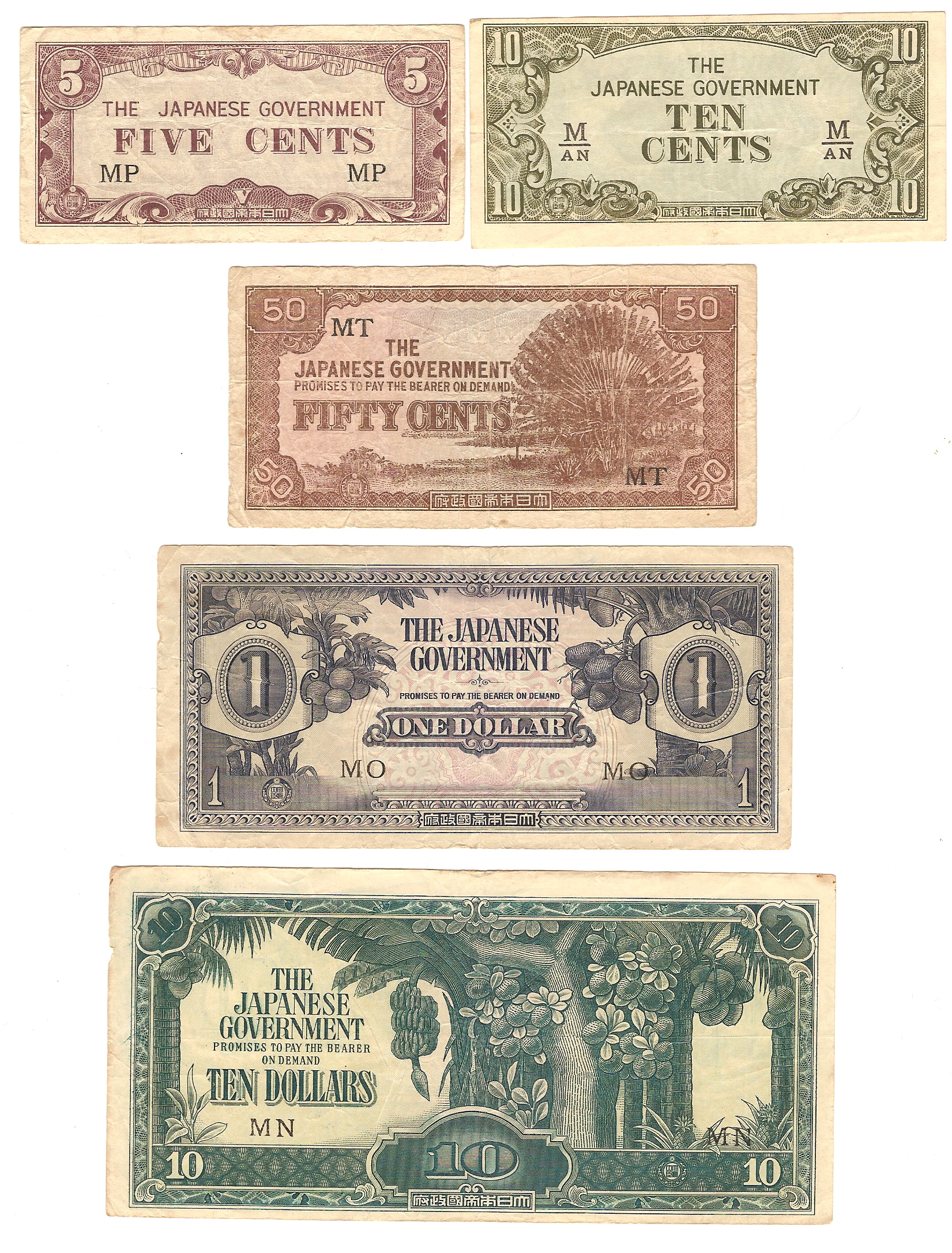
Banana banknotes in the possession of civilian internees at Batu Lintang camp, Sarawak, Borneo. The term "banana money" originates from the motifs of banana trees on the currency's 10 dollar banknote, seen here at the bottom.

The Japanese government-issued dollar was a form of currency issued for use within the Imperial Japan-occupied territories of Singapore, Malaya, North Borneo, Sarawak and Brunei between 1942 and 1945. The currency was also referred to informally (and with contempt and derision) as banana money (Malay: duit pisang), named as such because of the motifs of banana trees on 10 dollar banknotes. The Japanese dollar was in widespread use within the occupied territories where the previous currency became scarce. The currency were referred to as "dollars" and "cents" like its predecessors, the Straits dollar, Malayan dollar, Sarawak dollar and British North Borneo dollar.

The Japanese dollar was one of several forms of Japanese invasion money issued throughout the newly expanded Empire of Japan. Similar currencies were issued in Burma (as the Japanese rupee), the Dutch East Indies (as the Japanese gulden/roepiah), the Philippines (as the Japanese peso) and various Melanesian and Polynesian territories (as the Japanese pound).

== History ==
Following the fall of Singapore into the hands of Imperial Japan on 15 February 1942, the Japanese introduced new currencies to replace those previously in use in the occupied territories of Malaya, North Borneo, Sarawak and Brunei. The new currency in Malaya and Singapore were issued with the same value as the Malayan dollar, and first entered circulation in 1942. As with other currencies issued by Japan in occupied territories, local residents were forced to adopt the new currency, although existing coins were allowed to circulate until a shortage of coins required the Japanese administration to issue notes instead. Although new coins, bearing the name "Malaysia" and dated under the Japanese calendar, were planned for the region by the Osaka Mint, they never made it past the concept stage and only a few rare patterns exist.

To supply the authorities with money whenever they required it, the Japanese simply printed more notes. This resulted in hyperinflation and a severe depreciation in value of the banana note. Moreover, counterfeiting was rampant due to the absence of a serial number on many notes. Increasing inflation, coupled with Allied disruption of Japan's economy, forced the Japanese administration to issue banknotes in larger denominations, and increase the amount of money in circulation. Sharp drops in the currency's value and increased price of goods frequently occurred following a Japanese defeat in battle abroad.

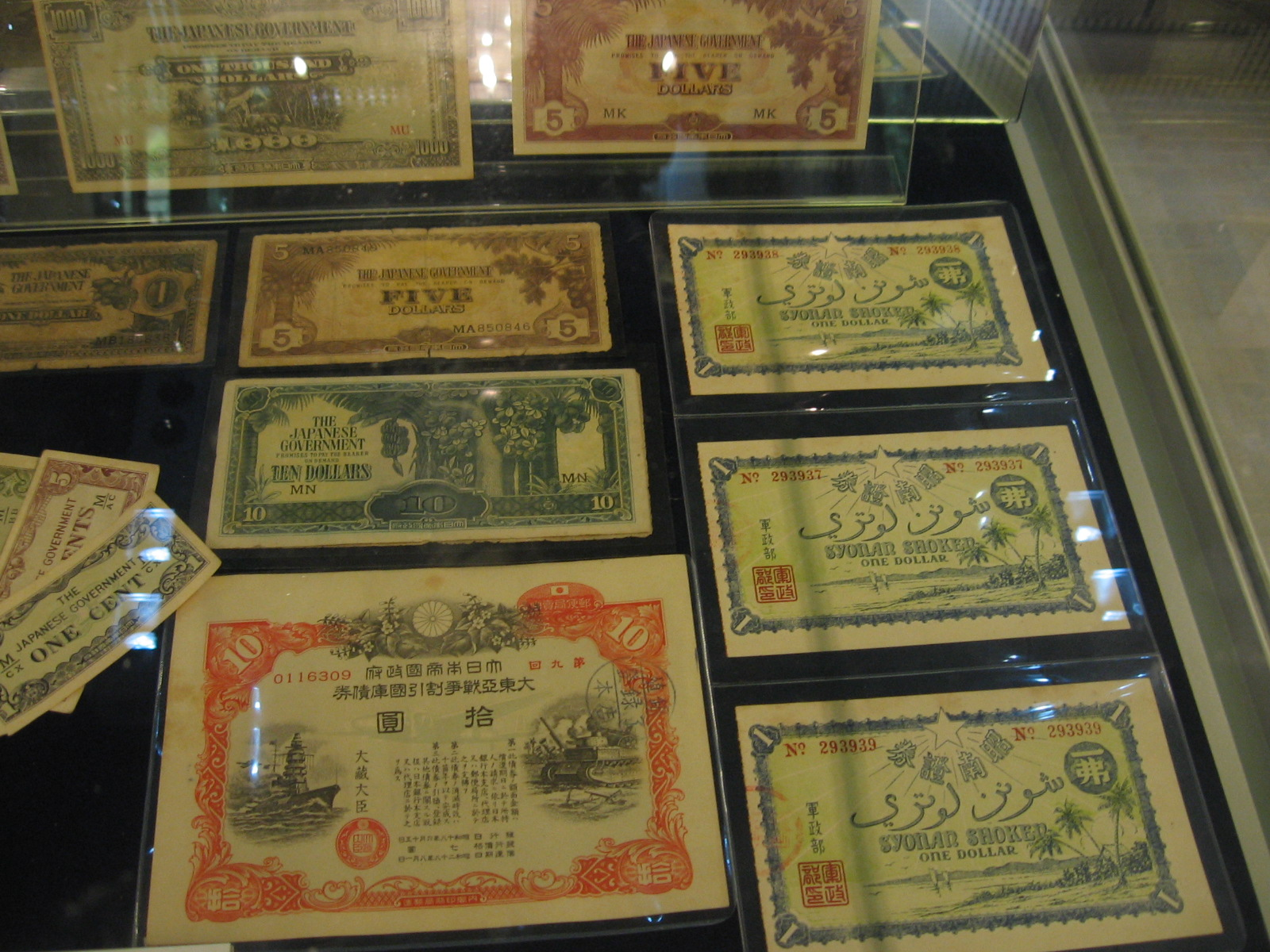
Different denominations of the banana money (top and left) on display at Memories at Old Ford Factory, Singapore. As banana money was rendered worthless immediately after World War II, banana money notes are now either museum exhibits or collector's items.

After the surrender of Japan, the currency became entirely worthless, and to this day the Japanese government has refused to exchange these currencies. Some locals managed to escape poverty because they had hidden Straits dollars and Malayan dollars, the currencies in use before the Japanese invaded. Those with hidden stashes of the old dollars were able to use them the moment the British resumed control of Singapore and surrounding colonies, when they became valid again. A number of surviving occupation banknotes were stamped as war souvenirs, while their use as printing paper for rudimentary calendars for 1946 was also recorded. When these notes became obsolete, punch holes were made in the notes to indicate they had been "cancelled" and stripped of redeemable value.

The present value of the currency as a collector's item remains mixed depending on their condition, the presence of serial numbers, the use of woven paper, and their use as specimens. Common notes lacking serial numbers are still worth below their printed value, while rarer versions are worth slightly over or several times their printed value. Notes stamped as war souvenirs are currently rare, while notes with 1946 calendar overprints fetch about RM3,000 (as of September 2006).

Ten dollar-sized leaflets reprinting the ten dollar note's obverse were also air-dropped by British air forces during the Japanese occupation as a warning to the population of the potential worthlessness of the currency in the event of Japanese defeat. Fear among the population of possessing the leaflet led to their rarity and present high value (at an estimated RM3,000 as of September 2006).

== Banknotes ==
The currency – both dollars and cents – was released solely in the form of banknotes, as metals were considered essential to the war effort. The notes retain certain features that were common among preceding currencies, such as the use of the dollar and cent currency name, albeit without the use of their respective currency symbols ($ and ¢). However, the languages used on the notes were reduced to English, and Japanese at the lower edge of the notes. Each note bears different obverse and reverse designs but retains similar layouts. Intended for circulation in Malaya, Singapore, Brunei, Sarawak and North Borneo, the notes were marked with stamped block letters that begin with "M" for "Malaya".

=== 1, 5 and 10 dollars (1942) ===
The first series of notes were originally of lower denominations of 1, 5 and 10 dollars, issued in 1942. Identical to the designs of 1942 Japanese notes issued in the East Indies, each note bears different obverse and reverse designs but retains similar layouts, with the obverse illustrating plantation crops. Additional 10 dollar notes were printed in 1944.

=== Cents (1942) ===
In September 1942, non-serialised currency notes were issued in denominations of 1, 5, 10 and 50 cents as a response to a shortage of old coins. The cent notes follow a set of standardized designs used for subunit notes across other occupied regions, lacking plantation crops on the obverse with the 50 cent note being the exception (which is identical in design to the half-gulden note in the East Indies). The cent notes are noticeably smaller than dollar notes.

=== 100 and 1,000 dollars (1944–45) ===
Worsened economic conditions in the following years forced the Japanese government to begin printing notes of larger denominations of 100 dollars in 1944 and 1,000 dollars in 1945. The 100 dollar note was redesigned in the 1945 series to accommodate for the new 1,000 dollar note, recycling a majority of design elements from the 1944 100 dollar note. Illustration on the notes adopt more localized imagery, centering around images of rural life. The 100 and 1,000 dollar notes were the last new notes introduced before the surrender of Imperial Japan in August 1945.

== Complete issue of Japanese invasion money ==
Complete issue of Japanese invasion money in Malaya and Borneo, 1942–45
Image	Value	Issue date	Printing blocks	Images
	1 Cent	1942	(Note: Records of specific lower denomination blocks were not reported, but they existed in two formats: fractional (a single block letter over two slightly smaller block letters) and double block letters (as reported for the higher denomination notes).)	
	5 Cents	1942		
	10 Cents	1942		
	50 Cents	1942	MA–MT	O: Traveller's palm
	1 Dollar	1942	MA–MO; MR–MS	O: Breadfruit tree (left), coconut palm (right)
	5 Dollars	1942	MA (with series no) MB (with series no) MB–MK; MO–MP; MR	O: Coconut palm (left), pawpaw tree (right)
	10 Dollars	1944	MB–MP	O: Banana tree, guava tree and coconut palm, flanked by pineapple plants and coconut palms to the left and right R: Beach facing the sea with a modern ship on the horizon
	100 Dollars	1944	MT	O: Palm trees and Malay house by water R: Man and water buffaloes in a stream
	100 Dollars	1945	MA	O: Laborers at a rubber plantation R: Stilted attap Malay houses by a seashore
	1,000 Dollars	1945	MU MA (Black color)	O: Oxcart; R: Man and water buffaloes in a stream

== Other Japanese government-issued invasion currencies ==
- Japanese government-issued Philippine peso
- Japanese government-issued rupee in Burma
- Japanese government-issued currency in the Dutch East Indies
- Japanese government-issued Oceanian Pound

== See also ==
- Japanese military yen
- Japanese invasion money

== Publications ==
- Cuhaj, George S., ed. (2010). Standard Catalog of World Paper Money General Issues (1368-1960) (13 ed.). Krause. ISBN 978-1-4402-1293-2.

Preceded by: Malayan dollar Location: present day Peninsular Malaysia, Singapore, Brunei; Reason: fall of Malaya, Borneo and Singapore in the hands of Japan in World War II. Ratio: at par	Currency of British Malaya and Brunei; 1942 – August 1945	Succeeded by: Malayan dollar Location: present day Peninsular Malaysia, Singapore, Brunei; Reason: Japan lost World War II. Ratio: The occupation currency became worthless. The value of the pre-occupation currency was restored.
Preceded by: Sarawak dollar Location: present day Sarawak, Malaysia; Reason: fall of Borneo in the hands of Japan in World War II. Ratio: at par with the Malayan dollar	Currency of the Kingdom of Sarawak; 1942 – August 1945	Succeeded by: Sarawak dollar Location: present day Sarawak, Malaysia; Reason: Japan lost World War II. Ratio: The occupation currency became worthless. The value of the pre-occupation currency was restored.
Preceded by: British North Borneo dollar Location: present day Sabah, Malaysia; Reason: fall of Borneo in the hands of Japan in World War II. Ratio: at par with the Malayan dollar	Currency of North Borneo; 1942 – August 1945	Succeeded by: British North Borneo dollar Location: present day Sabah, Malaysia; Reason: Japan lost World War II. Ratio: The occupation currency became worthless. The value of the pre-occupation currency was restored.
