= Japanese government–issued currency in the Dutch East Indies =

Currency issued by the Japanese occupiers in the Dutch East Indies between 1942 and 1945

Units of account
- Base unit: guilder, rupiah
- Plural: guilders
- Symbol: N/A
- Subunit
- 1/100: cent
- Plural
- cent: cents

Denominations
- Banknotes: 1, 5, 10 cents 1/2, 1, 5, 10 gulden (first issue); 1/2, 1, 5, 10, 100 roepiah (second issue)
- Coins: 1, 5, and 10 sen (never released)

Demographics
- Date of introduction: 1942
- Date of withdrawal: 1945
- User(s): Occupied Dutch East Indies; Occupied Portuguese Timor

Issuance
- Central bank: Bank of Japan/Southern Development Bank
- Mint: Japan Mint, Osaka Branch

Valuation
- Pegged with: Japanese yen
- This infobox shows the latest status before this currency was rendered obsolete.

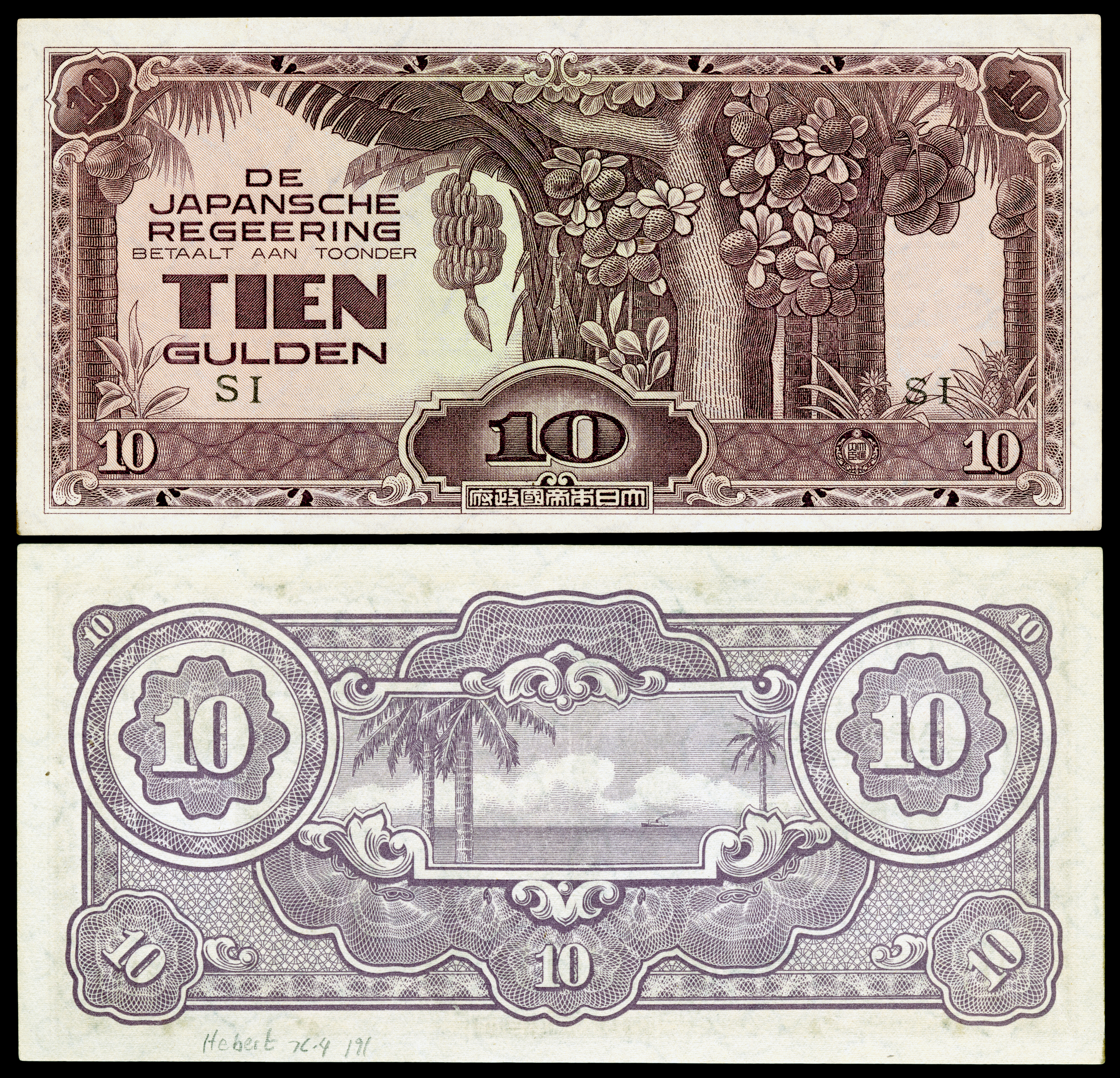
10 guilder banknote, part of the Japanese invasion issue of banknotes.

The Netherlands Indies guilder, later the Netherlands Indies roepiah ([ruˈpiah]), was the currency issued by the Japanese occupiers in the Dutch East Indies between 1942 and 1945. It was subdivided into 100 cents (Indonesian: sen) and replaced the guilder at par.

== History ==
=== Background ===
In December 1941, the Empire of Japan began its assault on British Borneo; by January 1942 its armies had begun to attack those parts of the island which were part of the Dutch East Indies. This was followed by attacks on Sumatra and Java in February. Ultimately, the Dutch colonial government capitulated on 8 March 1942, though pockets of resistance lasted for several months. In the succeeding months, the Japanese government closed the banks, seized assets and currency, and assumed control of the Indies' economy.

Java was left under the administration of the Sixteenth Army, Sumatra under the Twenty-Fifth Army, and the remainder of the archipelago under the Imperial Japanese Navy. This administrative division meant that some notes were highly localized. For instance, the 100 and 1000 guilder notes, with a design similar to that used in occupied Malaya (also under the Twenty-Fifth Army), were only meant to be circulated in Sumatra. There is no evidence, however, that the latter were actually in use.

=== Occupation ===
The Japanese occupation government immediately began issuing military banknotes for use in the occupied Indies, as had previously been done in other occupied territories. These first banknotes were printed in Japan, and issued by the Ministry of Finance. This issue formally retained the guilder name, though in common indigene parlance it was called oeang Djepang (Japanese money) or oeang pisang (banana money, for the prominent bananas on the ten guilder note). Each guilder (or, later, roepiah) consisted of 100 cents (sen).

After the occupation began, the Japanese military government ruled that, as of 11 March 1942, the only valid currency in the region were military banknotes and existing colonial guilder. Soon, however, they had begun replacing the pre-war currency at par. They soon required that all extant Dutch currency be exchanged for the occupation issue. This policy, however, was not implemented very strictly, and pre-war currency was widely hoarded, even in the internment camps.

After the Battle of Timor, the Japanese decreed, through their "Edital of 24 February 1942", that the guilder also circulate in Portuguese Timor, replacing the Timorese pataca.

In March 1943, the Japanese occupation government ceased issuing military notes; at the time, military currency to the value of 353 million guilder was in circulation. Printing operations were moved to Kolff in Batavia (now Jakarta), Java. These banknotes, which experienced no change in appearance, were issued by the Southern Development Bank (SDB), which had been established the preceding year and was managed by Yokohama Specie Bank and Bank of Taiwan.

Under the SDB, an increasingly large amount of currency was issued; professor Shibata Yoshimasa (柴田 善雅) writes that, by the end of 1943, the total circulation had almost doubled to 674 million guilder, reaching almost two billion by the end of 1944. This increase in circulation was followed by a drastic increase in inflation. Ultimately, this currency, renamed the roepiah for the 1944 issue, was widely used but highly depreciated.

=== Post-surrender ===
The Japanese forces surrendered on 15 August, and two days later the Republic of Indonesia proclaimed its independence. Initially, the widely available Japanese-issued roepiah was accepted as legal tender, together with the pre-war guilder, in both areas controlled by the Netherlands and those under Republican rule; indeed, the Netherlands Indies Civil Administration (NICA) printed more to deal with the costs of reestablishing Dutch administration in the area, though this also led to a continued increase in inflation. Japanese issued notes were not, however, at par with pre-war guilder; in Java, the exchange rate was 10:1 to 12:1.

On 6 March 1946, Dutch-controlled areas replaced the Japanese-issue roepiah with the NICA-issued guilder, giving an official exchange rate of 3 NICA guilder to 100 Japanese roepiah. The Republican government followed suit on 30 October 1946, replacing the occupation currency with Oeang Repoeblik Indonesia (ORI) at an official rate of 50 Japanese roepiah for 1 ORI. However, owing to the ongoing Indonesian National Revolution and the resulting chaotic monetary landscape, Japanese-issued bills remained in use into 1949.

The Indonesian Minister of Finance, Alexander Andries Maramis, estimated in 1946 that the Japanese had put some 2.2 billion roepiah into circulation by the end of the occupation. Shibata gives a considerably higher amount, over 3.1 billion. The Australian historian Robert Cribb, meanwhile, writes that the Japanese issued considerably more than they recorded, and that – combined with money printed after the Japanese surrender – the actual total could be between 3.5 and 8 billion, with only 2.7 billion issued during the occupation.

In Portuguese Timor, the Banco Nacional Ultramarino allowed the exchange of the guilder for Timorese pataca at par until 31 December 1954.

== Coins ==
Known as the "Puppet Series" for each having depicted a distinctive traditional Indonesian shadow puppet, these coins were originally struck in tin with denominations of 1, 5, and 10 sen. They were dated 2604 using the classical Japanese imperial year calendar system, which equals 1943 in the Gregorian calendar. However, as the war began to turn against Japan her advantageous shipping routes were disrupted, and many coins destined towards the Indies were lost in transit due to heavy artillery fire and torpedoing of Japanese ships by Allied forces; this resulted in the series having never been issued. Most of the unused stock was later melted down and today very few specimens of any denomination survive.

== Issuance ==
=== 1942 (ND) guilder Issue ===
The Japanese invasion money used in the Netherlands Indies was first denominated in guilder (1942) and later in Roepiah (1944–45). The guilder issue bears the payment obligation in the Dutch language as "De Japansche Regeering Betaalt Aan Toonder" (The Japanese Government pays to the bearer) on notes one-half guilder and above. On smaller change notes (1–10 cents) it is shortened to “De Japansche Regeering”. All Japanese invasion money used in the Netherlands Indies bear the block prefix letter “S” either followed by a number (lower denominations, 1–10 cents), a second letter, or as the numerator in a fractional block layout. Serial numbers were used for the initial printings of higher denomination notes (i.e., 1, 5, and 10 guilder) but the printing machinery used by the Japanese after March 1943 (i.e., Kolff printing facility in Jakarta) did not allow for automatic sequential numbering thus the task was very slow and often resulted in multiple notes with the same serial number. By the middle of the second printing (the SB block) serial numbers were abandoned. Notes of one-half guilder and above are printed on paper watermarked with a repeating kiri flower.

=== 1944 (ND) Roepiah Issue ===
First issued in September 1944, the "Dai Nippon Teikoku Seihu" (English: The Japanese Imperial Government) notes were denominated in Roepiah and printed entirely in Java. The Dutch language was replaced with Indonesian ("Bahasa Indonesia") as far as the value of each banknote. However, the words "The Japanese Imperial Government" were printed in the Japanese language transliterated into Latin script. In Japanese characters, Dai Nippon Teikoku Seihu would be: 大日本帝国政府.

== Banknote table ==
=== Japanese guilder (1942) ===
1942 complete issue of Japanese invasion money (Japanese guilder)
Image	Value	Issue date	Printing blocks	Images
	1 Cent	1942	unk	scroll work
	5 Cents	1942	unk	scroll work
	10 Cents	1942	unk	scroll work
	Half guilder	1942	SA–SK, SM, SL	Fan palm; scroll work
	1 guilder	1942	SA–SI, SL, SN	Breadfruit tree; scroll work
	5 guilder	1942	SA–SG	Coconut palm, pawpaw; scroll work
	10 guilder	1942	SA–SI, SK, SL	Banana tree, coconut palm; palm trees, horizon

=== Japanese roepiah (1944) ===
1944 issue of Japanese invasion money (Japanese roepiah)
Image	Value	Issue date	Images
	half Roepiah	1944	Ornate dragon
	1 Roepiah	1944	Rice growing; Banyan tree
	5 Roepiah	1944	Batak house; Batak woman
	10 Roepiah	1944	Javanese dancer; Buddha, stupas (Borobudur Temple)
	100 Roepiah	1944	Vishnu on Garuda, Saruda, Lion; Wayang puppet

== See also ==
- Japanese military yen
- Oceanian Pound
- Japanese government-issued Philippine peso
- Japanese government-issued rupee in Burma

== Works cited ==
- "DJB [De Javasche Bank] during the Japanese Occupation (1942 – 1945)" (PDF). Bank Indonesia Museum. 2008. Archived from the original (PDF) on 2014-12-04.
- Cribb, Robert (April 1981). "Political Dimensions of the Currency Question 1945-1947". Indonesia. 31 (31): 113–136. doi:10.2307/3351017. hdl:1813/53717. JSTOR 3351017. Archived from the original on June 17, 2012.
- Cuhaj, George S., ed. (2010). Standard Catalog of World Paper Money General Issues - 1368-1960. Vol. 2. Krause. ISBN 978-1-4402-1293-2. Archived from the original on 2017-04-26.
- Ricklefs, M. C. (1993). A History of Modern Indonesia since c.1300 (2nd ed.). Hampshire: MacMillan. ISBN 978-0-333-57689-2.
- Judisseno, Rimsky K (2002). Sistem Moneter dan Perbankan di Indonesia [Monetary and Banking System in Indonesia] (in Indonesian). Jakarta: Gramedia. ISBN 978-979-686-895-7.
- Shibata, Yoshimasa (1996). "The Monetary Policy in the Netherlands East Indies under the Japanese Administration". Bijdragen tot de Taal-, Land- en Volkenkunde. 152 (4): 699–724. doi:10.1163/22134379-90003959. JSTOR 27864801. (Full PDF)
  - Also published in: Shibata, Yoshimasa (1997). "The Monetary Policy in the Netherlands East Indies under the Japanese Administration". In Post, Peter; Elly Touwen-Bouwsma (eds.). Japan, Indonesia and the War: Myths and Realities. Leiden: Royal Netherlands Institute of Southeast Asian and Caribbean Studies (KITLV). pp. 177–202.
