= Japanese government–issued Oceanian pound =

Currency

Unit
- Plural: pounds
- Symbol: £

Denominations
- Subunit
- ^{1}/_{20}: shilling
- Plural
- shilling: shillings
- Banknotes: 1/2/–, 1/–, 10/–, £1

Demographics
- Date of introduction: 1942
- Date of withdrawal: 1945
- User(s): Gilbert and Ellice Islands; Nauru; New Guinea; British Solomon Islands; South Seas Mandate

Issuance
- Central bank: Bank of Japan (Empire of Japan)

Valuation
- Pegged with: Japanese yen
- This infobox shows the latest status before this currency was rendered obsolete.

The pound was one of several issues of Japanese invasion money used during World War II. One pound was subdivided into 20 shillings. Consisting of only four denominations, the Oceanian pound was the shortest set (i.e., total number of denominations) issued. Only notes for £1, 10/–, 1/– and 1/2/– were issued.

The currency was issued in the occupied territories of Guam, Gilbert Islands and Ocean Island (Japanese occupation of the Gilbert Islands), Caroline Islands, Marianas Islands, Solomon Islands, Palau, and the now defunct Territory of New Guinea. Although officially called "Oceania" the region was considered a financial and currency union under Japanese colonial dominion that included several political jurisdictions rather than a single polity.

== Banknotes ==
Common among most issues of Japanese invasion money, the Oceania notes denote the issuer as "The Japanese Government" rather than the name of the region they were intended for. This is due to many of these notes having been printed ahead of time and intended to circulate in more than one country in a given region intended to be absorbed into the Greater East Asia Co-Prosperity Sphere. As a result, many of them are considered temporary issues. The Oceanian series can be identified in two particular ways, one being the image of a palm-lined beach depicted on all denominations, and the "serial number" having two identifying letters printed on the obverse. The first letter “O” indicates the note was printed and issued for Oceania and is present on all Oceanian denominations. The second letter is the block (or printing batch) of the note. The two lower denomination notes (1/2/– and 1/–) were printed in three blocks (OA, OB, and OC). The two higher denomination notes (10/– and £1) were only printed in a single block (OA).

In August 1945 the Co-Prosperity Sphere was dissolved and the Oceanian pound was abolished shortly after, with the old currency replaced by the Australian pound or the US dollar depending on the territory.

1942 issue of Japanese invasion money (Oceanian pound)
Image	Value
	1/2/–
	1/–
	10/–
	£1

== Other Japanese government-issued invasion currencies ==
- Japanese government–issued Philippine peso
- Japanese government–issued dollar in Malaya and Borneo
- Japanese government–issued rupee in Burma
- Japanese government–issued currency in the Dutch East Indies

== Replica notes ==
Early in 1944 crude copies were being made and sold out of Sydney, with the word "replica" printed in small letters on the reverse. Authorities determined that since the notes were not legal tender in Australia (with or without the word "replica"), the practice was not illegal. However the responsible party, a print shop in Brisbane, was cited for violating wartime regulations governing the rationing of paper, and shut down. These replica notes trade for roughly ten times the prices commanded by the circulated notes.

== See also ==
- Japanese military yen
- List of territories occupied by Imperial Japan
- South Seas Mandate
