= Australia–Kiribati relations =

- Australia: Kiribati

Foreign relations exist between Australia and Kiribati. Formally established upon Kiribati's independence in 1979, bilateral relations are diplomatically facilitated by the Australian High Commission located in Tarawa, Kiribati, while Kiribati maintains its consular and diplomatic presence in Australia via an Honorary Consulate General in New South Wales. Both countries are active members of several multilateral and regional institutions, including the Commonwealth of Nations, the Pacific Regional Environment Programme the Pacific Islands Forum and The Pacific Community.

== History ==
After the late 19th century rise of the copra industry in Micronesia, Australians traded with the natives on the islands of Kiribati, the Marshall Islands and the Federated States of Micronesia. By the 1900s, Australians became aware of the phosphate reserves on Kiribati's Banaba and the Micronesian island of Nauru. The existence of phosphate on both Nauru and Banaba was confirmed on a trip by Australian-born New Zealander Albert Fuller-Ellis, who went on to manage phosphate mines between 1906 and 1911. Australia seized Nauru from Germany in 1914, and went on to administer it until its independence in 1968. The United Kingdom established a protectorate over Kiribati's Gilbert Islands in 1892, which was subsequently organized alongside the Ellice Islands into the Gilbert and Ellice Islands Crown Colony in 1916. British colonial administration continued until the islands achieved full independence in 1979. While under British rule, Australia, the United Kingdom, and New Zealand collaborated through the operation of the Pacific Phosphate Company. This company mined rich phosphate deposits on Banaba and Nauru. Australian agriculture heavily relied on Banaban phosphate to boost soil fertility, linking Australian economic productivity directly to the island's resource extraction.

Prior to World War I, various forms of currency circulated through the islands. From World War I onward, the Australian pound became the primary circulating currency throughout the island chain due to growing commercial ties with Australia. During the 1940s, specific local banknotes were issued for the Gilbert and Ellice Islands, which remained redeemable for British Pound Sterling at face value. In World War II, Japanese military forces occupied parts of the territory, including Tarawa. The occupying administration introduced the Oceanian pound as a universal military currency for Pacific territories under Japanese control. Meanwhile, on the atolls that remained unoccupied by Japan, the Australian pound continued to function as the official medium of exchange. Following the conclusion of the war, the Australian pound was fully restored across all the islands. When Australia decided to decimalize its currency and transition to the Australian dollar on February 14, 1966, the Gilbert and Ellice Islands naturally followed this shift, using standard Australian banknotes and coins for all everyday financial transactions.

Upon gaining full independence from the United Kingdom in 1979, the newly sovereign Republic of Kiribati sought a tangible symbol of its national sovereignty and decided to issue its own coinage. While the government chose to continue utilizing Australian paper banknotes for practical daily convenience, it authorized the minting of official Kiribati dollar coins. These coins were issued in denominations matching Australian coin sizes and compositions and were locked at a strict one-to-one fixed exchange parity with the Australian dollar. Because Kiribati has never printed paper banknotes under its own national name and stopped minting general circulation coins after 1992, the country operates today almost exclusively within the Australian currency zone. While original Kiribati coins technically remain legal tender, they are rarely encountered in everyday commerce and are instead sought after by numismatists and collectors.

Australia joined the United Kingdom's Commonwealth of Nations as a founding member in 1949, while Kiribati joined as a full member immediately upon gaining its independence in 1979. It is currently one of only two Micronesian countries in the Commonwealth of Nations, alongside Nauru, with other areas in Micronesia having historically had closer ties to the United States rather than the United Kingdom. In 1971, Australia became a founding member of the regional institution the Pacific Islands Forum (known as the South Pacific Forum until 1999), with Kiribati joining upon independence. The organization changed its name to the Pacific Islands Forum to reflect the admission of Micronesian countries in the North Pacific, including Kiribati, which has islands in both the South Pacific and North Pacific. In 2021, Kiribati and the four other Micronesian countries in the Pacific Islands Forum threatened to leave the organization, due to perceived bias towards the more southern countries in Melanesia and Polynesia. The five Micronesian countries eventually struck a deal in July 2022 to stay in the organization.

== Aid ==
Kiribati is one of the poorest island countries in the Pacific and has long relied on Australia as a large bilateral aid donor. Australia's Official Development Assistance (ODA) was estimated at $39.3 million for Kiribati in 2026–27. Previously it had been $39.5 million in 2025–26 and $46.8 million in 2024–25. This assistance intends to advance Kiribati's core national pillars; Te Mauri (Health), Te Raoi (Peace), and Te Tabomoa (Prosperity). Since 2016, Australian aid to Kiribati has also been aligned with the overarching goals of the Government of Kiribati's twenty-year development blueprint; the Kiribati Vision for 20 years 2016-2036 (KV20).

In the late 1990s, one of its aid initiatives was a water supply and sanitation project for Kiribati's Kiritimati island. Australia has worked alongside the Kiribati Ministry of Health and Medical Services to build a stronger health system aligned with national strategic priorities. This effort includes the Kiribati-Australia Health Support Program Phase II (KAHSP II), valued at $12.65 million from 2024 to 2031. Building upon the foundational achievements of KAHSP I ($9.6 million from 2018 to 2023), the program strengthens health information systems, workforce planning, and strategic oversight while directly tackling chronic health conditions, mental health services, rehabilitation, and high-burden infectious diseases such as tuberculosis, leprosy, and hepatitis B.

For stability and social development, the Kiribati Education Improvement Program (KEIP) has invested over $98 million since 2011 to build climate-resilient schools, enhance teacher training and support inclusive learning for children with disabilities. Australia also partners with Kiribati on law and justice frameworks to reduce gender-based violence and improve victim support services. Australia has provided approximately $20 million since 2016 for disaster resilience. This includes the $5.8 million Kiribati Australia Climate Security Initiative (KACSI) (June 2023–December 2026) for nature-based coastal protection and the Atoll Food Futures Project (partnering with Live and Learn) to supply households and communities with nurseries, biofilta foodcubes, keyhole gardens, and water tanks to enhance food security.

To foster structural fiscal reforms, Australia cooperates on the Kiribati-Development Partner Economic Reform Taskforce, alongside the World Bank, Asian Development Bank, New Zealand, and the European Union. In 2021, Australia and partners Japan and the United States also invested in the East Micronesia Cable project to enhance regional telecommunications connectivity across Kiribati, Nauru, and the Federated States of Micronesia.

To boost workforce capability and employment opportunities, the $49 million Kiribati-Australia Skills for Employment Program (2016–2026) partners with the Kiribati Institute of Technology (KIT) to deliver essential vocational training. These programs connect directly to the Pacific Australia Labour Mobility (PALM) scheme, enabling Kiribati's workers to secure formal employment in Australia across agriculture, horticulture, aquaculture, aged care, and meatworks. Alongside these employment pathways, complementary efforts are also underway to improve regional flight connectivity.
