= Burmese rupee =

Former Burmese currency used from 1852–1952

Units of account
- Subunit
- 1/16: pe
- 1/64: pya

Denominations
- Banknotes: 1, 5, 10, 100 rupees
- Coins: 2 pyas, 1, 2, 4, 8 pe

Demographics
- User(s): Burma

Issuance
- Central bank: Burma Currency Board (1947-1952)

Valuation
- Pegged with: Indian rupee
- This infobox shows the latest status before this currency was rendered obsolete.

The rupee was the currency of Burma (now Myanmar) between 1852 and 1952, except for the years 1943–1945.

== History ==
When Burma was conquered by the British, the Indian rupee replaced the kyat at par. From 1897, the government of India issued notes in Rangoon of the same general type as were issued in India but featuring languages used in Burma rather than those of India. In 1917 and again from 1927, Indian notes were overprinted for use in Burma. When Burma became a separate colony in 1937, a separate issue of paper money was made for use only in Burma but no separate coinage was issued.

When the Japanese invaded Burma in 1942, they introduced a new currency: the rupee, divided into 100 cents. This currency was only issued in paper form. The rupee was replaced by the kyat in 1943. In 1945, the Japanese occupation currency was declared worthless and Burma reverted to using Indian coinage and its own rupee paper money, with the pre-war value of the Burmese rupee (1s 6d sterling) restored.

Following independence in 1948, Burma introduced its own rupee currency, consisting of coins and banknotes. One rupee was divided into 16 pe (equal to the Indian anna), each of 4 pyas (equal to the Indian pice). It was equal in value to the Indian rupee. The rupee was replaced by the decimalized kyat in 1952 at par.

== Coins ==
In 1949, coins were introduced in denominations of 2 pya, 1, 2, 4 and 8 pe. They matched the size, shapes, and cupro-nickel composition of the Indian 1/2, 1 and 2 annas and 1/4 and 1/2 rupee. The reverse on all of these coins featured the chinthe (stylized lion), and a stylized floral design with the denominations in Burmese on the reverse.

== Banknotes ==
1 Rupee featuring the green peacock (1948)

Between 1897 and 1922, notes for 5, 10 and 100 rupees were issued which differed from the Indian notes only in the languages used. In 1917, Indian 2 1/2 rupees notes were overprinted for use in Burma, with 50 rupees in 1927 and 100 rupees between 1927 and 1937 also being overprinted for the same purpose.

In 1937, 5, 10 and 100 rupees notes of the Reserve Bank of India were overprinted with the text "Legal Tender in Burma Only". In 1938, the first regular issue of Burmese notes was made by the Reserve Bank of India, in denominations of 5, 10, 100, 1000 and 10,000 rupees.

In 1942, the Japanese issued notes for 1, 5 and 10 cents and 1/4, 1/2, 1, 5, 10 and 100 rupees. These were replaced in 1944 by notes issued in 1, 5, 10, and 100 kyats, also known as the short lived Second Burmese kyat. In 1945, the Military Administration issued overprinted Indian notes for 1, 5, 10 and 100 rupees to replace the Japanese issued kyat notes.

In 1947, the Burma Currency Board took over the issuance of paper money, with notes for 1, 5, 10 and 100 rupees. Following independence in 1948, the government issued notes for the same denominations. In 1953, the Union Bank of Burma issued a final series of notes denominated in rupees, issuing the same denominations as the previous two series.
