= British North Borneo dollar =

Currency from 1882 to 1953

NB$
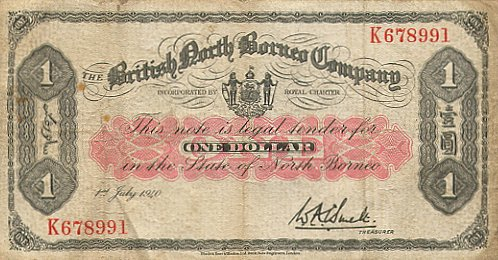
- One dollar note dated 1940

Unit
- Symbol: $

Denominations
- Subunit
- 1/100: cent
- Banknotes: 25, 50 cents, $1, $5, $10, $25
- Coins: 1/2, 1, 2 1/2, 5, 25 cents

Demographics
- Replaced by: Malaya and British Borneo dollar
- User(s): North Borneo

Issuance
- Central bank: British North Borneo Company

Valuation
- Pegged with: Pound sterling at -/2/4d
- This infobox shows the latest status before this currency was rendered obsolete.

The British North Borneo dollar was the currency of British North Borneo from 1882 to 1953. It was subdivided into 100 cents. The dollar had remained at par with the Straits dollar (and its successor the Malayan dollar), the currency of Malaya and Singapore, at the value of one dollar to 2 shillings 4 pence sterling from its introduction until both currencies were replaced by the Malaya and British Borneo dollar in 1953. Both coins and banknotes were issued by the British North Borneo Company.

During the Japanese occupation period (1942–1945), paper money was issued in denominations ranging from 1 cent to 1000 dollars. This currency was fixed at 1 dollar = 1 Japanese yen, compared to a 1:2 pre-war rate. Following the war, the Japanese occupation currency was declared worthless and the previous issues of the British North Borneo dollar regained their value relative to sterling (two shillings four pence).

== Coins ==
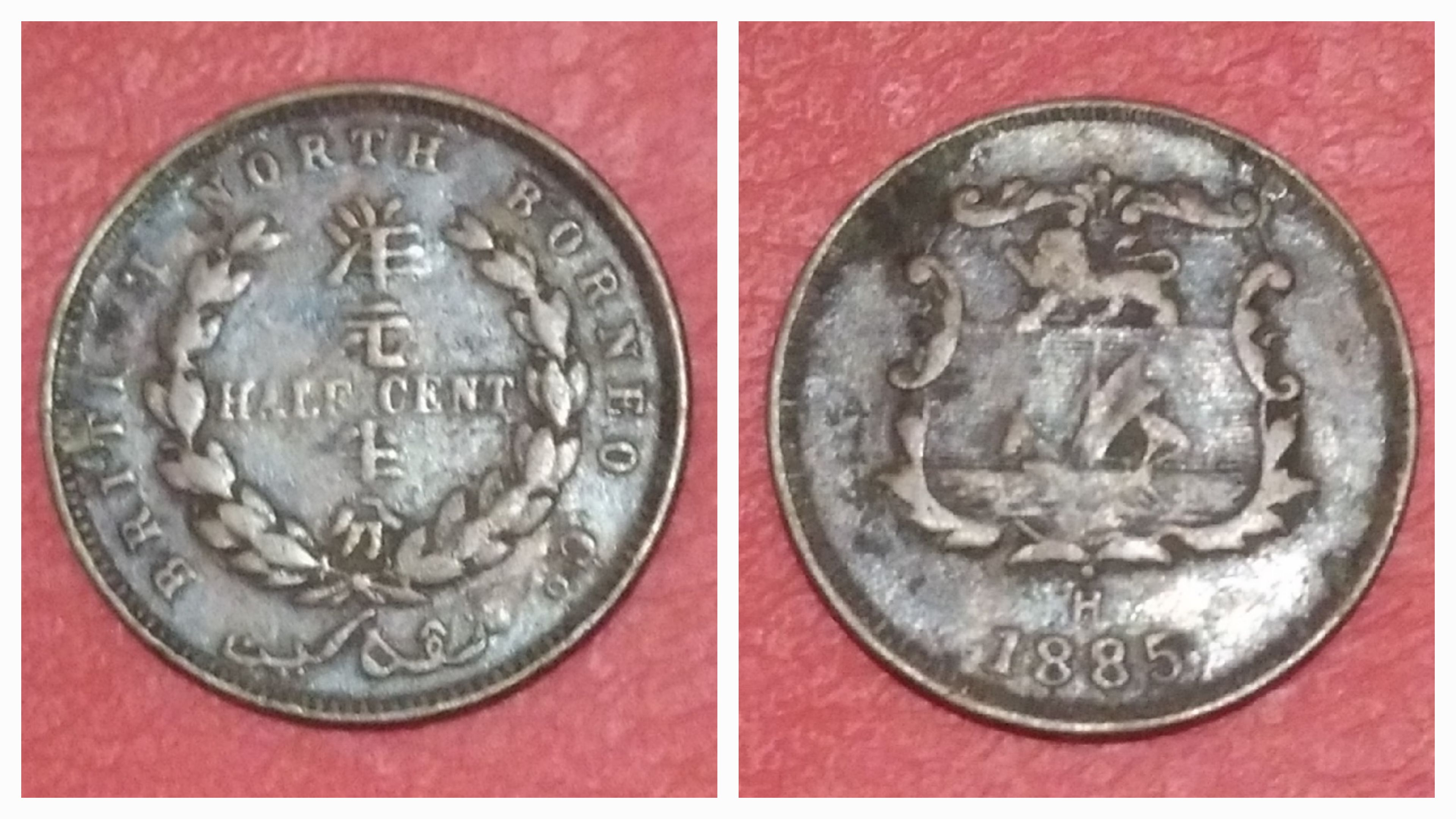
British North Borneo Company half cent of 1885

Coins were first minted in values of 1/2 cent and 1 cent in copper, and later 1 cent, 2 1/2 cents, and 5 cents in copper-nickel, and 25 cents in silver. Originally they were issued under the name "British North Borneo Co", as The British North Borneo Company had the right to produce coin under its Royal Charter granted in 1881. Later they were minted under "State of North Borneo", starting in 1903. All coins depicted the company/state coat of arms on the obverse and denomination on the reverse. These were last minted in 1941 and later phased out and replaced by coins of the Malayan dollar.

== Banknote ==
Banknotes were printed in values of 25 cents, 50 cents, $1, $5, $10, and $25. The design of the banknotes did not change much during the currency's lifetime. However, their physical sizes tend to shrink over time. They either show the coat of arms, Mount Kinabalu, or both.

== See also ==
- Malayan dollar
- Postal orders of British North Borneo
- Sarawak dollar

pre-WWII
Preceded by: No modern predecessor	Currency of British North Borneo; 1882 – 1942; Note: had been at par with Straits dollar, and Malayan dollar after 1939	Succeeded by: Japanese government-issued dollar Location: present day Malaysia, Singapore, Brunei; Reason: Japanese occupation Ratio: at par Note: The Japanese allowed the former currencies to circulate, but they were in practice hoarded as a more reliable store of value.

post-WWII
Preceded by: Japanese government-issued dollar Location: present day Malaysia, Singapore, Brunei; Reason: Japan lost World War II; Ratio: The occupation currency became worthless. The value of the pre-occupation currency was restored.	Currency of British North Borneo; 1945 – 1953; Note: had been at par with Malayan dollar	Succeeded by: Malaya and British Borneo dollar Reason: creation of a common Board of Commissioners of Currency; Ratio: at par, or 60 dollars = 7 British pounds
