= Malaya and British Borneo dollar =

Currency of Malaya, Singapore, Sarawak, North Borneo, Brunei, and Riau

Ringgit (Malay) رڠڬيت (Jawi)
- Malaya & British Borneo $1 note issued in 1959

Units of account
- Symbol: $
- Subunit
- 1/100: cent

Denominations
- Banknotes: 1, 5, 10, 50, 100, 1,000, 10,000 dollars
- Coins: 1, 5, 10, 20, 50 cents

Demographics
- User(s): Malaya, Singapore, Brunei, North Borneo and Sarawak

Issuance
- Central bank: Board of Commissioners of Currency, Malaya and British Borneo
- This infobox shows the latest status before this currency was rendered obsolete.

The Malaya and British Borneo dollar (Malay: ringgit; Jawi: رڠڬيت) was the currency of Malaya, Singapore, Sarawak, North Borneo, Brunei and the Riau Archipelago from 1953 to 1967 and was the successor of the Malayan dollar and Sarawak dollar, replacing them at par. The currency was issued by the Board of Commissioners of Currency, Malaya and British Borneo. Prior to 1952, the board was known as the Board of Commissioners of Currency, Malaya.

The Malaya and British Borneo dollar was used in Malaya after independence in 1957, and in Malaysia after its formation in 1963, as well as in Singapore after its independence in 1965. After 1967, the two countries and Brunei ended the common currency arrangement and began issuing their own currencies. However, the Malaya and British Borneo dollar continued to be legal tender until 16 January 1969. The currency was also used in the Riau Archipelago in Indonesia prior to 1963, when it was replaced by the local rupiah.

== History ==
=== Board of Commissioners of Currency, Malaya and British Borneo ===
The Currency Ordinance No. 44 of 1952 of the Crown Colony of Singapore, No. 33 of 1951 of the Federation of Malaya, No. 10 of 1951 of North Borneo and No. 1 of 1951 of Sarawak implemented an agreement between those governments and the State of Brunei for the establishment of a Board of Commissioners of Currency to be the sole issuing authority in British Malaya and British Borneo.

This agreement became effective on 1 January 1952. The Board consisted of five members:

1. Financial Secretary of Singapore who was also the chairman of the Board
2. Minister of Finance for the Federation of Malaya
3. Governor of Sarawak
4. Governor of North Borneo
5. British Resident of Brunei
6. and two further appointed by agreement of the participating governments.

=== End of common currency ===
On 12 June 1967, the currency union came to an end and Malaysia, Singapore and Brunei each began issuing their own currencies: the Malaysian dollar, Singapore dollar and Brunei dollar. The currencies of the three countries were interchangeable at par value under the Interchangeability Agreement until 8 May 1973 when the Malaysian government decided to terminate it. Brunei and Singapore continue with the Agreement until the present day.

The Board of Commissioners of Currency, Malaya and British Borneo was officially wound up on 30 November 1979.

== Coins ==
Coins were issued in bronze 1 cent square shaped coins issued between 1956 and 1961, and circular coins of similar composition from 1962, and cupro-nickel 5, 10, 20, and 50 cents. These all shared a similar basic design depicting Queen Elizabeth II on the obverse and denomination on the reverse. However, the Queen was replaced with two daggers on the smaller round cent of 1962. These coins carried the same design features and sizes from the coins of the previous Commissioner's Currency and Straits series, making them relatively unchanged in appearance except for the depictions of the British monarchs. The older coins also continued to circulate alongside these bearing the new title.

== Banknotes ==
=== 1953 series ===
All notes bear the date 21 March 1953, and signed by W.C. Taylor, the chairman of the Board of Commissioners of Currency. The 1, 5 and 10 dollar notes were printed by Waterlow and Sons, the 50 and 100 dollar notes were printed by Bradbury, Wilkinson & Co. Ltd. and the 1,000 and 10,000 dollar notes were printed by Thomas de la Rue & Co. Ltd. As a safeguard against forgery, a broken security thread and the watermark of a lion's head were incorporated in the paper before printing.

1953 Series
Image		Value	Main Colour	Description		Date of issue
Obverse	Reverse	Value	Main Colour	Obverse	Reverse	Date of issue
$1	$1	$1	Blue/pink	Elizabeth II	State emblems of the Federation of Malaya and its constituent components, Singapore, North Borneo, Sarawak and Brunei	21 March 1953
$5	$5	$5	Green/yellow	Elizabeth II	State emblems of the Federation of Malaya and its constituent components, Singapore, North Borneo, Sarawak and Brunei	21 March 1953
$10	$10	$10	Red/green	Elizabeth II	State emblems of the Federation of Malaya and its constituent components, Singapore, North Borneo, Sarawak and Brunei	21 March 1953
$50	$50	$50	Blue/green	Elizabeth II	State emblems of the Federation of Malaya and its constituent components, Singapore, North Borneo, Sarawak and Brunei	21 March 1953
$100	$100	$100	Violet/pink	Elizabeth II	State emblems of the Federation of Malaya and its constituent components, Singapore, North Borneo, Sarawak and Brunei	21 March 1953
$1000	$1000	$1000	purple/yellow	Elizabeth II	State emblems of the Federation of Malaya and its constituent components, Singapore, North Borneo, Sarawak and Brunei	21 March 1953
$10000	$10000	$10,000	green/multicoloured	Elizabeth II	State emblems of the Federation of Malaya and its constituent components, Singapore, North Borneo, Sarawak and Brunei	21 March 1953

=== 1959 series ===
1959 Series
Image		Value	Main Colour	Description		Date of issue
Obverse	Reverse	Value	Main Colour	Obverse	Reverse	Date of issue
$1	$1	$1	Blue/green	Sail boat	State emblem of the Federation of Malaya, Singapore, North Borneo, Sarawak and Brunei; scene of fishermen returning from sea	1 March 1959
$10	$5	$10	Red/grey	Farmer ploughing padi field with buffalo	State emblem of the Federation of Malaya, Singapore, North Borneo, Sarawak and Brunei	1 March 1961

== See also ==
- British North Borneo dollar
- Malayan dollar
- Sarawak dollar
- Straits dollar

Preceded by: Sarawak dollar (post-WWII); Reason: Creation of a common currency board Ratio: at par, or 8.57 dollars = 1 British pound	Currency of Sarawak; 1953 – 1963	Currency of Malaysia; 1963 – 1967		Succeeded by: Malaysian dollar Location: Malaysia; Reason: End of common currency board Ratio: at par, or 8.57 ringgit = 1 British pound
Preceded by: British North Borneo dollar (post-WWII); Reason: Creation of a common currency board Ratio: at par, or 8.57 dollars = 1 British pound	Currency of British North Borneo; 1953 – 1963	Currency of Malaysia; 1963 – 1967		Succeeded by: Malaysian dollar Location: Malaysia; Reason: End of common currency board Ratio: at par, or 8.57 ringgit = 1 British pound
Preceded by: Malayan dollar (post-WWII); Reason: Creation of a common currency board Ratio: at par, or 60 dollars = 7 British pounds, about 8.57 dollars = 1 British pound	Currency of Malaya; 1953 – 1963	Currency of Malaysia; 1963 – 1967		Succeeded by: Malaysian dollar Location: Malaysia; Reason: End of common currency board Ratio: at par, or 8.57 ringgit = 1 British pound
Preceded by: Malayan dollar (post-WWII); Reason: Creation of a common currency board Ratio: at par, or 60 dollars = 7 British pounds, about 8.57 dollars = 1 British pound	Currency of Singapore; 1953 – 1963	Currency of Malaysia; 1963 – 1965	Currency of Singapore; 1965 – 1967	Succeeded by: Singapore dollar Location: Singapore; Reason: End of common currency board Ratio: at par, or 8.57 dollars = 1 British pound
Preceded by: Malayan dollar (post-WWII); Reason: Creation of a common currency board Ratio: at par, or 60 dollars = 7 British pounds, about 8.57 dollars = 1 British pound	Currency of Brunei; 1953 – 1967			Succeeded by: Brunei dollar Reason: End of common currency board Ratio: at par, or 8.57 dollars = 1 British pound
Preceded by: Malayan dollar (post-WWII); Reason: Creation of a common currency board Ratio: at par, or 60 dollars = 7 British pounds, about 8.57 dollars = 1 British pound	Currency of Riau Archipelago; 1953 – 1963	Succeeded by: Riau rupiah Location: Riau Archipelago; Reason: To create a common currency in Indonesia; Ratio: at par, or 8.57 Riau rupiah= 1 British pound		
