= Sarawak dollar =

Currency of Sarawak from 1858 to 1953

Sarawak dollar
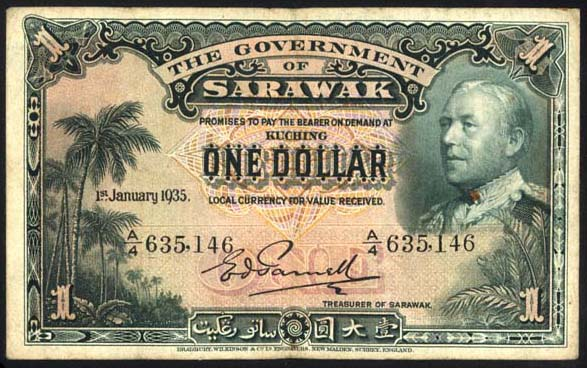
- Sarawak dollar of 1935

Units of account
- Symbol: $
- Subunit
- 1/100: cent

Denominations
- Banknotes: 5, 10, 20, 25, 50 cents, 1, 5, 10, 25, 50, 100 dollars
- Coins: 1/4, 1/2, 1, 5, 10, 20, 50 cents

Demographics
- User(s): Raj of Sarawak

Issuance
- Central bank: Government of Sarawak
- This infobox shows the latest status before this currency was rendered obsolete.

The dollar was the currency of the Raj of Sarawak from 1858 to 1953. It was subdivided into 100 cents. The dollar remained at par with the Straits dollar and its successor the Malayan dollar, the currency of Malaya and Singapore, from its introduction until both currencies were replaced by the Malaya and British Borneo dollar in 1953.

During the Japanese occupation period (1942–1945), paper money was issued in denominations ranging from 1 cent to 1,000 dollars. This currency was fixed at 1 dollar = 1 Japanese yen, compared to a 1:2 pre-war rate. Following the war, the Japanese occupation currency was declared worthless and the previous issues of the Sarawakian dollar regained their value relative to sterling (two shillings four pence).

== Coins ==
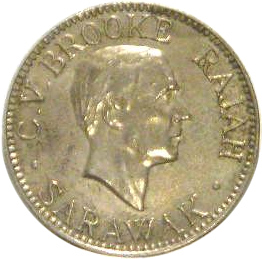
A 10 cent coin minted in 1920 bearing the portrait of Charles Vyner Brooke.

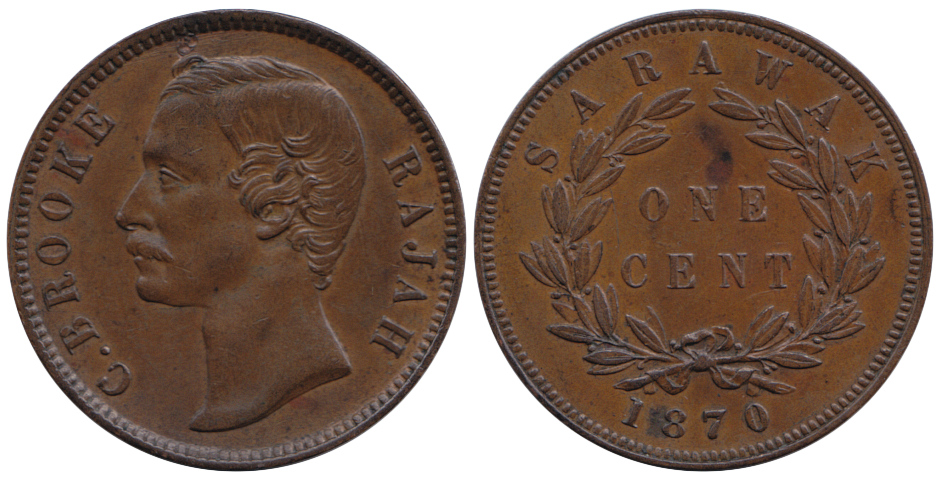
A 1 cent coin minted in 1870 bearing the portrait of Charles Brooke.

All Sarawak coins carry the portrait and the name of one of the three "White Rajahs" of Sarawak, James Brooke until 1868, Charles Brooke from 1868 to 1917, and Charles Vyner Brooke from 1917 to the end of this currency in 1938. Throughout the history of the Sarawak dollar, coins were minted in values of 1/4 cent, 1/2 cent, 1 cent, 5 cents, 10 cents, 20 cents, and 50 cents. The copper 1/4 was the smallest denomination and the first to be discontinued, last being issued in 1896. The 1/2 was also always copper and after reductions in size was eventually discontinued in 1933. Starting in 1892 1 cent coins had a hole in the centre, but the holed design was discontinued after 1897.

In 1920 the 1 cent coin was struck in copper-nickel but later reverted to bronze in 1927. The 5 and 10 cent coins were 80% silver until 1920, when they were briefly reduced to 40% silver and then replaced by copper-nickel the same year. The 20 and 50 cent coins remained silver but in 1920 were reduced from 80% to 40%.

== Banknotes ==
The first series was issued by the Sarawak Government Treasury. They were hand-stamped notes of low quality. All later notes were issued by the Government of Sarawak except for the 10-cent and 25-cent notes in 1919 (by the Treasury again). Throughout its history, banknotes came in the values of 5 cents, 10 cents, 20 cents, 25 cents, 50 cents, $1, $5, $10, $25, $50, and $100.

== See also ==
- British North Borneo dollar

pre-WWII
Preceded by: No modern predecessor	Currency of the Raj of Sarawak; 1858 – 1942; Note: had been at par with the Straits dollar, and the Malayan dollar after 1939	Succeeded by: Japanese government-issued dollar Location: present day Malaysia, Singapore, Brunei; Reason: Japanese occupation Ratio: at par Note: The Japanese allowed the former currencies to circulate, but they were in practice hoarded as a more reliable store of value.

post-WWII
Preceded by: Japanese government-issued dollar Location: present day Malaysia, Singapore, Brunei; Reason: Japan lost World War II; Ratio: The occupation currency became worthless. The value of the pre-occupation currency was restored.	Currency of the Raj of Sarawak; 1945 – 1946; Note: had been at par with the Malayan dollar	Currency of the Colony of Sarawak; 1946 – 1953; Note: had been at par with the Malayan dollar	Succeeded by: Malaya and British Borneo dollar Reason: creation of a common Board of Commissioners of Currency; Ratio: at par, or 60 dollars = 7 British pounds
