= Japanese government–issued rupee in Burma =

Japanese invasion money issued during the Second World War

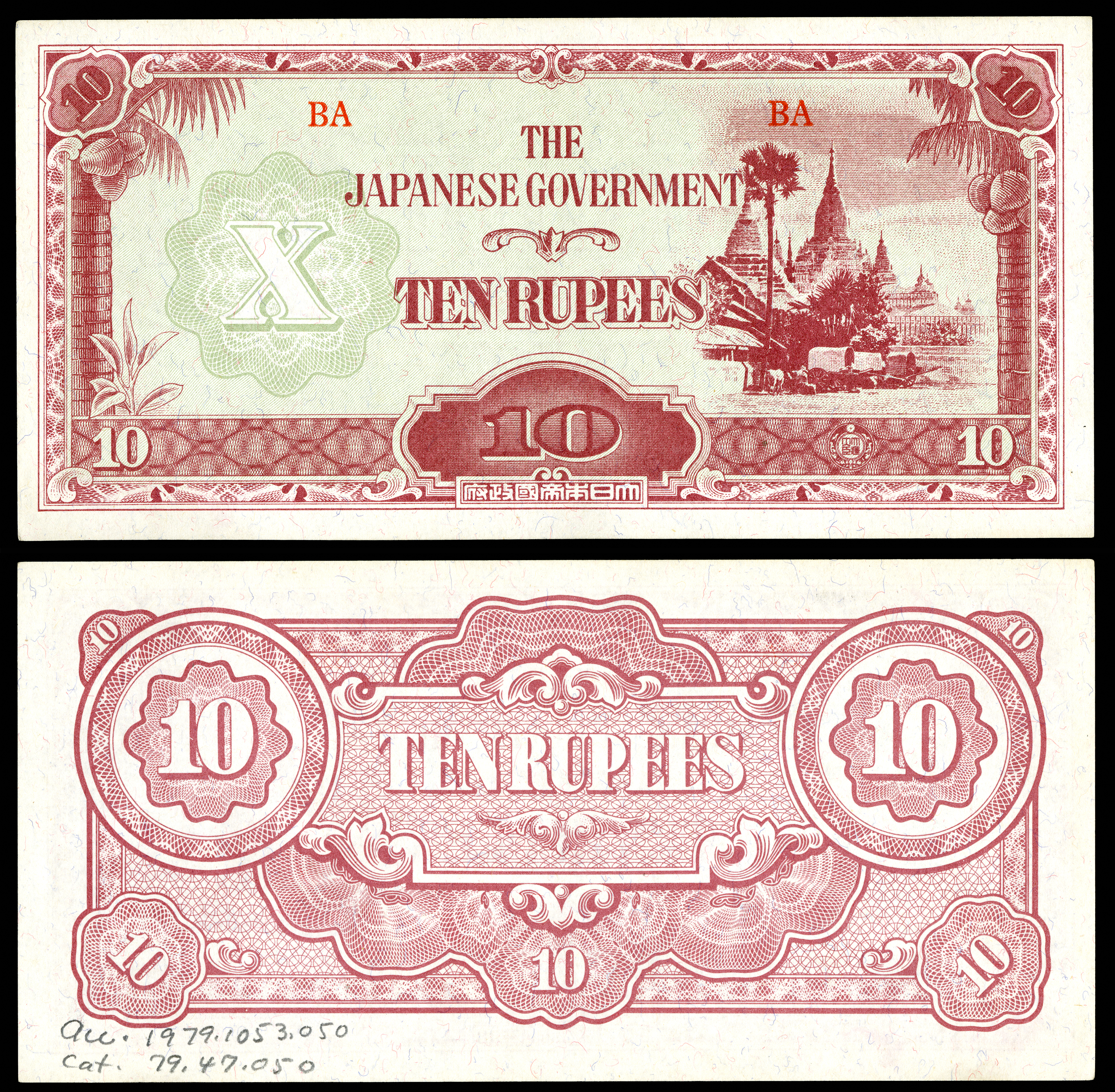
- Rs. 10/- Japanese occupation note obverse (1942-44)

Unit
- Plural: rupees
- Symbol: Re/Rs

Denominations
- Subunit
- 1/100: Cent
- Plural
- Cent: cents
- Banknotes: 1 cent, 5 cents, 10 cents, Re. 1/4, Re. 1/2, Re. 1/-, Rs. 5/-, Rs. 10/-, Rs. 100/-

Demographics
- Date of introduction: 1942
- Date of withdrawal: 1944
- User(s): (Myanmar) Japanese-occupied Burma

Issuance
- Central bank: Empire of Japan
- This infobox shows the latest status before this currency was rendered obsolete.

The Japanese government-issued rupee in Burma was a Japanese invasion money issued by the Japanese Military Authority, as a replacement for local currency during the Japanese occupation of Burma in the Second World War.

Prior to the Japanese invasion, Burma had circulated the Indian rupee issued by the Reserve Bank of India from the time the paper currency was introduced by the British Administration in 1897.

The Japanese invaded Burma in January 1942. They conquered Mandalay on 21 May 1942, forcing the British to retreat into India. The Japanese held Burma until the second Allied campaign of 1944, although an official surrender did not take place until August 1945. In 1942, the Japanese issued paper sculpture currency of 1, 5, and 10 cents and Re. 1/4, Re. 1/2, Re. 1/-, Rs. 5/-, and Rs. 10/-. Like most Japanese colonial currency from this period, a letter code was used on the notes. The first or top letter “B” indicates the note was printed and issued for Burma. The second letter or letters indicate the block (or printing batch) of the note, there are single letter blocks and double letter blocks for Burma, with the latter two letter blocks being identified by a hyphen separating the letter "B" from the block letters.

In 1943, the Japanese commuted the sentence of Dr Ba Maw, an outspoken advocate for Burmese self-rule, and installed him as the head of the puppet government. From 1943 onward the Japanese issued paper sculpture currency of Re. 1/-, Rs. 5/-, and Rs. 10/- with a Rs. 100 note/- in 1944. The Japanese characters in the oblong box at the bottom of each note read “Government of Great Imperial Japan” and the contents of the seal comprise the Japanese symbol for the Minister of Finance.

When all of these notes became obsolete, punch holes were made to indicate that the note had been "cancelled" and therefore demonetised.

== Japanese government-issued rupee in Burma (1942–44) ==
1942–44 complete issue of Japanese invasion money (Burma)
Image	Value	Size	Issue date	Printing blocks	Images
	1 cent	95.00 x 45.00 mm	1942	BA–BP, B/AA–B/EX	
	5 cents	100.00 x 48.00 mm	1942	BA–BZ, B/AB–B/BX	
	10 cents	106.00 x 51.00 mm	1942	BA–BZ, B/AA–B/AR	
	Quarter rupee	100.00 x 51.00 mm	1942	BA–BV	
	Half rupee	120.00 x 58.00 mm	1942	BA–BD	Ananda Temple, Bagan
	Re. 1/-	140.00 x 67.00 mm	1942	BA–BD	Ananda Temple, Bagan
	Rs. 5/-	151.00 x 71.00 mm	1942–44	BA–BB	Ananda Temple, Bagan
	Rs. 10/-	160.00 x 76.00 mm	1942–44	BA	Ananda Temple, Bagan
	Rs. 100/-	169.00 x 82.00 mm	1944	BA	Ananda Temple, Bagan

For table standards, see the banknote specification table.

== Japanese government-issued rupee in India (1942–44) ==
During the World War II, Subhas Chandra Bose led Indian National Army (INA) seized Mizoram and parts of Nagaland in British India from the colonial British control with the help of Japanese forces. He made Ruzazho village operational base of INA, recruited more than thousand natives of Nagaland in INA to fight against British, banned the British Indian rupee and "Japanese government–issued rupee in Burma", also called Japanese rupee, was introduced.

== See also ==
- Emergency circulating notes
- Japanese government-issued dollar in Malaya and Borneo
- Burma
- Japanese invasion money

== Works cited ==
- Cuhaj, George S., ed. (2010). Standard Catalog of World Paper Money General Issues — 1368–1960 (volume 2). Krause. ISBN 978-1-4402-1293-2. Archived from the original on 2017-04-26.
