= Japanese military currency (1937–1945) =

Currency of the Imperial Japanese Armed Forces

日本軍用手票 (in Chinese and Japanese)
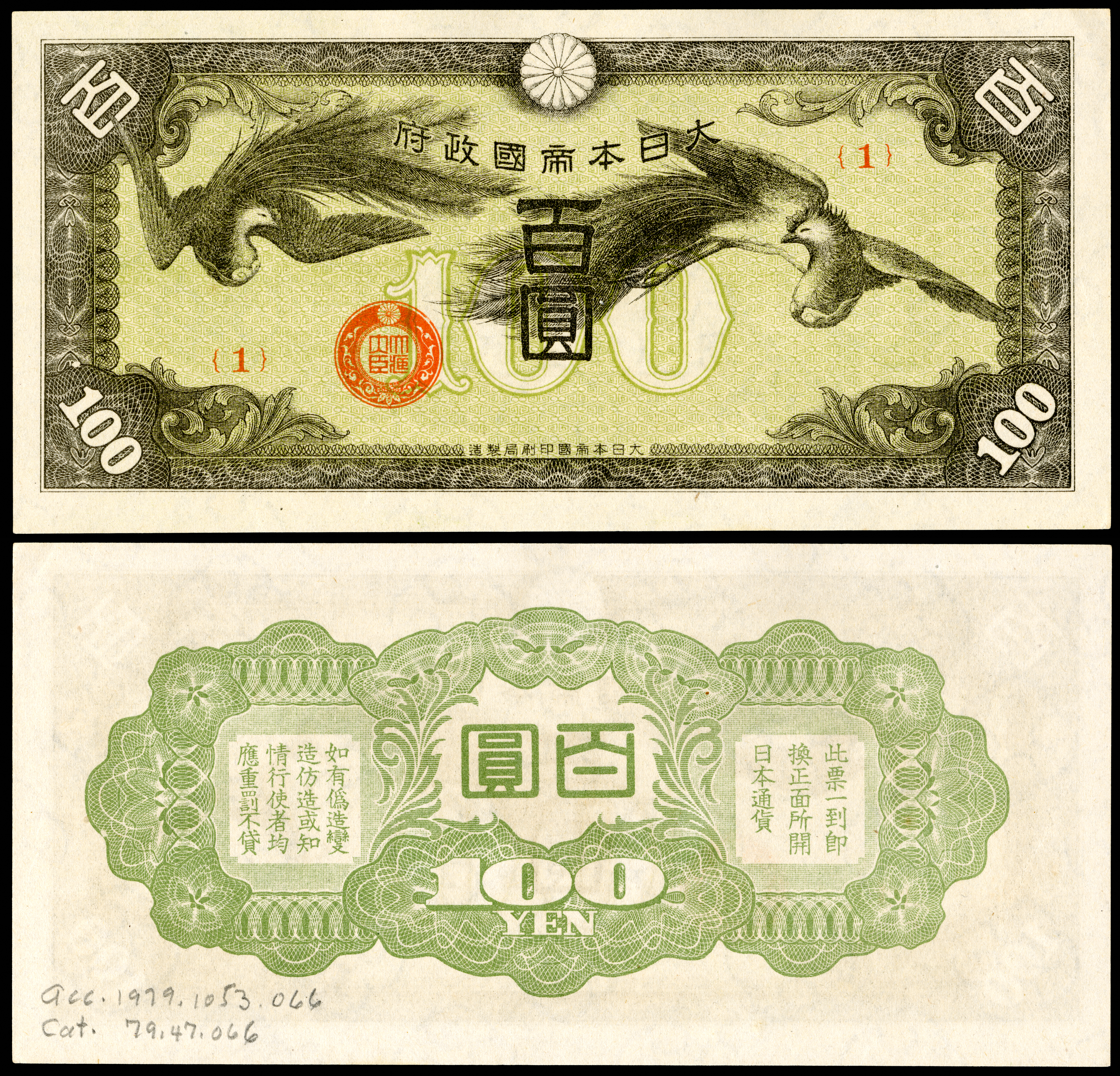
- 100 yen note (1945)

Units of account
- Symbol: ¥
- Subunit
- 1/100: Sen

Denominations
- Banknotes: 1 sen, 5 sen, 10 sen, 50 sen, ¥1, ¥5, ¥10, ¥100
- Coins: None

Demographics
- User(s): Areas occupied by Japan during World War II

Issuance
- Central bank: Ministry of War of Japan
- This infobox shows the latest status before this currency was rendered obsolete.

Japanese military currency (traditional Chinese and Japanese: 日本軍用手票, also 日本軍票 in short) was money issued to the soldiers of the Imperial Japanese Armed Forces as a salary. The military yen reached its peak during the Pacific War period, when the Japanese government excessively issued it to all of its occupied territories. In Hong Kong, the military yen was forced upon the local population as the sole official currency of the territory. Since the military yen was not backed by gold, and did not have a specific place of issuance, the military yen could not be exchanged for the Japanese yen. Forcing local populations to use the military yen officially was one of the ways the Japanese government could dominate the local economies.

== Currencies in territories occupied by Japan ==
The territories controlled or occupied by Japan had many different currencies. Taiwan maintained its own banking system and bank notes after it came under Japanese sovereignty in 1895. The same is true for Korea post 1910. Between 1931 and 1945, large parts of China and South East Asia were occupied by Japan. Several types of currencies were put into circulation there during the occupation. In China, several puppet governments were created (e.g. Manchukuo), each issuing their own currency. In South East Asia, the Japanese military arranged for bank notes to be issued, denominated in the various currencies (rupees, pesos, dollars, etc.) that had been circulating there prior to the occupation. These latter are referred to as Japanese invasion money. In addition to these currencies, the Japanese military issued their own bank notes, denominated in yen – this is the Japanese military yen. The military yen became the official currency in some occupied areas, e.g. Hong Kong.

== Design features of the Japanese military yen ==
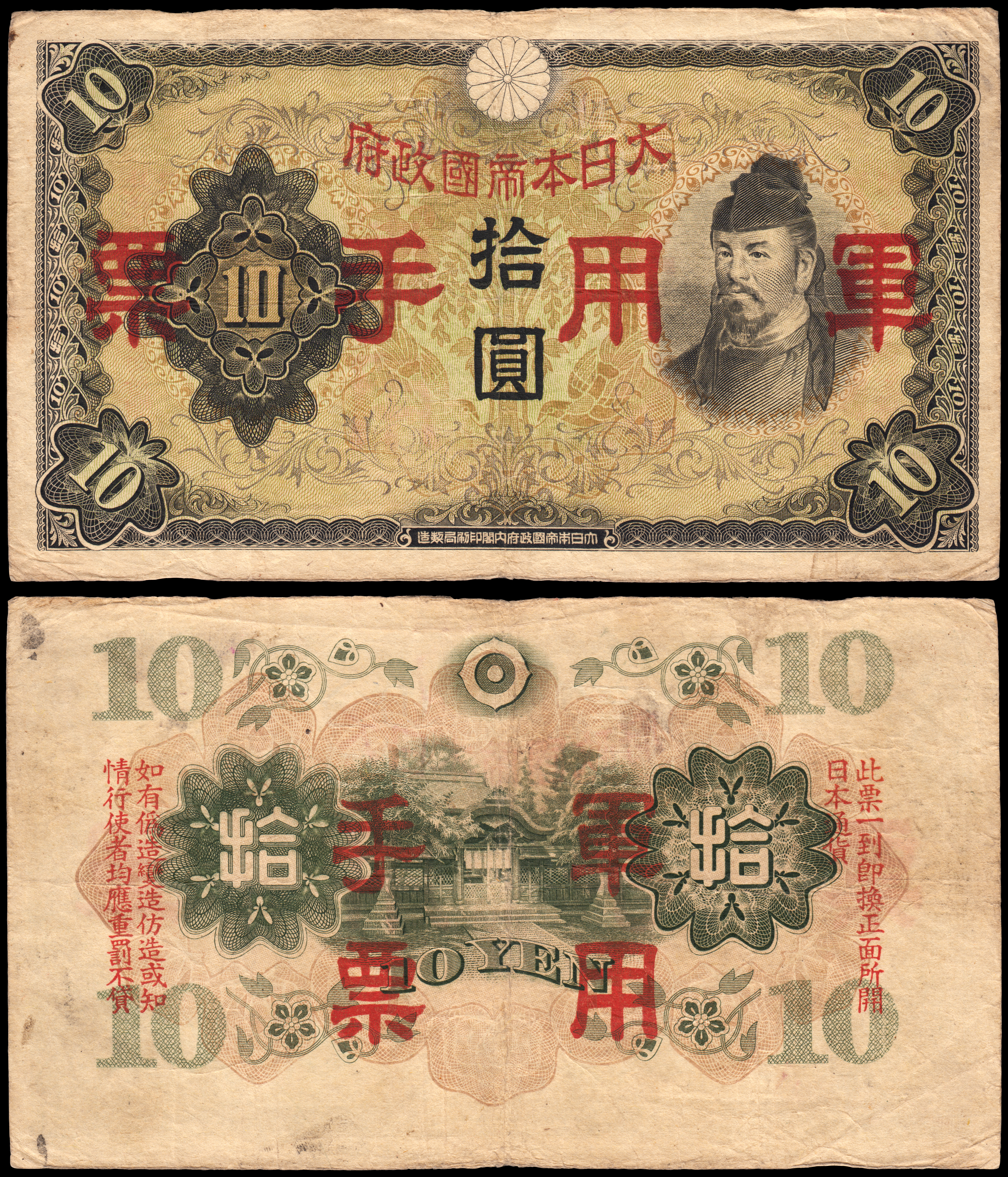
10 Yen note of the 1938 series

In the late 1930s there was an issue of military yen which was similar to the standard yen in terms of design, but with minor modifications. Generally, thick red lines were overprinted to cancel the name "Bank of Japan" (日本銀行) and any text promising to pay the bearer in gold or silver. Large red text instead indicated that the note was military currency ("軍用手票") so as not to be confused with regular Japanese yen.

Five-yen military note, fifth issue (1940), showing two long-tailed cockerels.

Later series were less crude. In the early 1940s, the Japanese government issued military yen notes with a design prepared specifically for the military yen. These designs were not based on existing Japanese yen notes, but featured original designs such as Onagadori cocks and dragons. All later series featured the following text on the reverse of the note:

此票一到即換正面所開日本通貨。如有偽造、變造、仿造、或知情行使者均應重罰不貸。

This text explains: "This note is exchangeable to Japanese currency upon presentation. Severe punishment will be applied to anyone who counterfeits notes or knowingly uses such notes."

Early issues did not have serial numbers, and were issued without regard for inflation. Later issues did initially feature serial numbers. Towards the end of the war, as more money was needed to pay military personnel, notes were issued without serial numbers once more.

== The military yen in Hong Kong ==
After the Hong Kong Government surrendered to the Japanese Imperial Army on 25 December 1941, the Japanese authorities decreed the military yen to be the legal tender of Hong Kong the following day.

The Japanese occupation also outlawed any use of Hong Kong dollar and set a deadline for exchanging dollars into yen.

When the military yen was first introduced on 26 December 1941, the exchange rate between the Hong Kong dollar and the military yen was 2 to 1. However, by October 1942, the rate was changed to 4 to 1.

After exchanging for Hong Kong dollars, the Japanese military purchased supplies and strategic goods in the neighbouring neutral Portuguese colony of Macao.

As Japan became more desperate in the war effort in 1944, the Japanese military authorities in Hong Kong circulated more military yen, resulting in hyperinflation.

After Japan announced its unconditional surrender on 15 August 1945, military yen banknotes were seized by British military authorities. However, although there was about as much as 1.9 billion yen, the Japanese military administrations intentionally destroyed 700 million worth of it.

== Nullification of the military yen and demands for redemption ==
On 6 September 1945, the Japanese Ministry of Finance announced that all military yen became void, reducing the military yen to useless pieces of paper.

On 13 August 1993, an organization in Hong Kong seeking a refund for military yen took legal action against Japan, suing the Japanese government for the money that was lost when the military yen was declared void. A Tokyo district court ruled against the plaintiff on 17 June 1999, stating that, although it acknowledged the suffering of the Hong Kong people, the government of Japan did not have specific laws concerning military yen compensation. Japan also used the Treaty of San Francisco, of which the United Kingdom was a signatory state, as one of the reasons to deny compensation.

== See also ==
- Japanese invasion money – Various other currencies issued in territories occupied by Japan
- Allied Military Currency – Currency issued by the Allied powers during World War II
- Banknotes of the British Armed Forces – Currency issued by the British Armed Forces from 1946 to 1972
- Military payment certificate – Currency issued by the U.S. military from the end of World War II to the Vietnam War.

== External links and references ==
- "Narcotics trade boosted army scrip", The Japan Times, 2007-08-30. Retrieved 16 October 2007.
- Gallery of banknotes.
- Bank of Japan "World War II Military Currency".
- Hong Kong Reparation Association.
- The Global History of Currencies (Japan).
