= Japanese invasion money =

Currency issued by the Japanese Military Authority

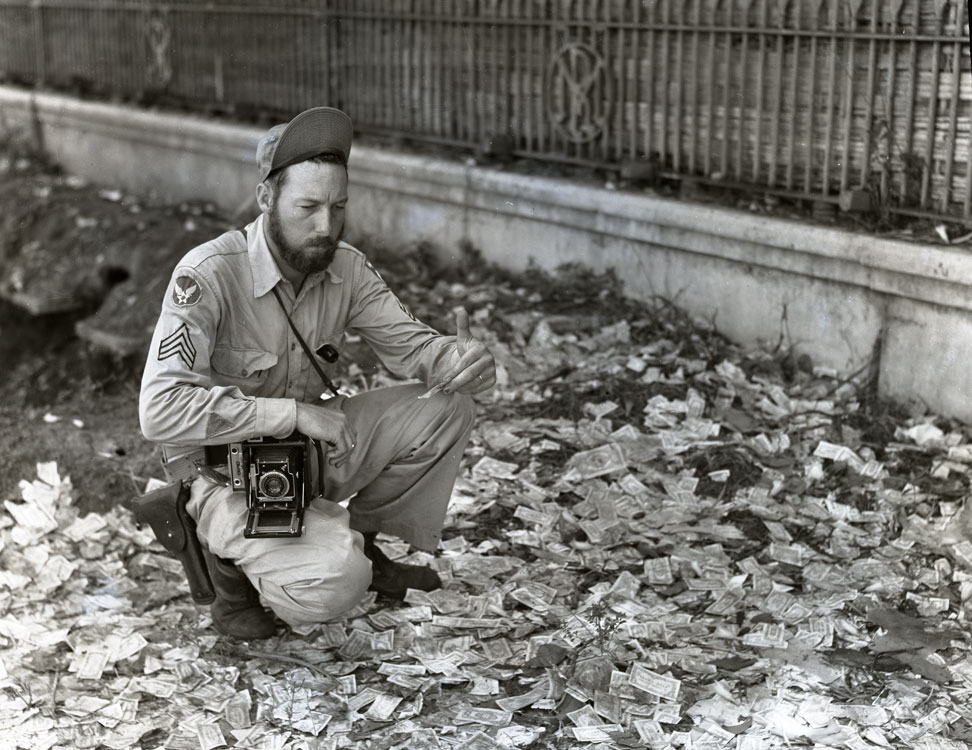
A photographer kneels on a street littered with invasion money, Rangoon, 1945.

Japanese invasion money, officially known as Southern Development Bank Notes (Japanese: 大東亜戦争軍票 Dai Tō-A Sensō gunpyō, "Greater East Asia War military scrip"), was currency issued by the Japanese Military Authority, as a replacement for local currency after the conquest of colonies and other states in World War II.

== History ==
In February 1942, the Japanese government passed laws establishing the Wartime Finance Bank and the Southern Development Bank. Both issued bonds to raise funds.

The Wartime Finance Bank primarily lent money to military industries, but also lent to hydroelectric generators, electric power companies, shipbuilding and petroleum.

The Southern Development Bank provided financial services in areas occupied by the Japanese military. Southern Development Bank notes were used as de facto military scrip. In December 1942, the outstanding balance of Southern Development Bank notes stood at more than 470 million. In March 1945, it was more than 13 billion.

Already engaged in war with China, in 1940 the Japanese expanded the scope of their military operations in Asia and entered the Second World War in late 1941 with the attack on Pearl Harbor. Japan invaded various Asian countries, occupying vast territories and setting up military administrations.

Beginning with the capture of the Philippines, the Japanese military confiscated all hard currency, on both federal and individual levels, replacing it with locally printed notes bearing a proclamation of military issue. All notes bore the name of the Imperial Japanese government. Some notes proclaimed the "promises to pay the bearer on demand". Called "Mickey Mouse Money" by local Filipinos, it was valueless after the overthrow of the Japanese, and tons of it were burned. Japanese troops were ordered to destroy bank records and any remaining currency prior to capitulation.

With the end of World War II, the currency circulated bearing the Japanese name immediately lost any value it once possessed and was discarded en masse. Money that was issued included the Philippines, Burma (now Myanmar), Malaya, North Borneo and Sarawak (now Malaysia), Singapore, Brunei, the Dutch East Indies (now Indonesia) and some areas of Oceania (New Guinea and the Solomon and Gilbert Islands). Large amounts of the currency were obtained by Allied forces and civilians at the end of the war. Many were kept as wartime souvenirs, and are now in both private and museum collections.

== Philippines ==
On 10 December 1941 Japanese troops landed on Luzon. The Japanese invaded Manila on 2 January 1942, and in the process captured more than $20.5 Million in U.S. and local cash and an unknown amount of foreign currency and bullion. The Japanese used this hard currency abroad to purchase raw materials, rice and weapons to fuel and feed its war machine. In its place, the Japanese issued several series of fiat currency. The first issue in 1942 consisted of denominations of 1, 5, 10 and 50 centavos and 1, 5, and 10 Pesos.

1943 brought "replacement notes" of the 1, 5 and 10 Pesos. 1944 ushered in a 100 Peso note and soon after an inflationary 500 Pesos note. Near the end of the war in 1945 the Japanese issued a 1,000 Pesos note. Plates for this note were completed in Manila shortly before U.S. troops entered the city on 3 February 1945, and the Japanese printed the 1,000 Pesos note while they were retreating from Manila to Baguio. The Japanese were on the defensive and short of supplies. They diluted printer's ink with duplicator fluid to stretch stores.

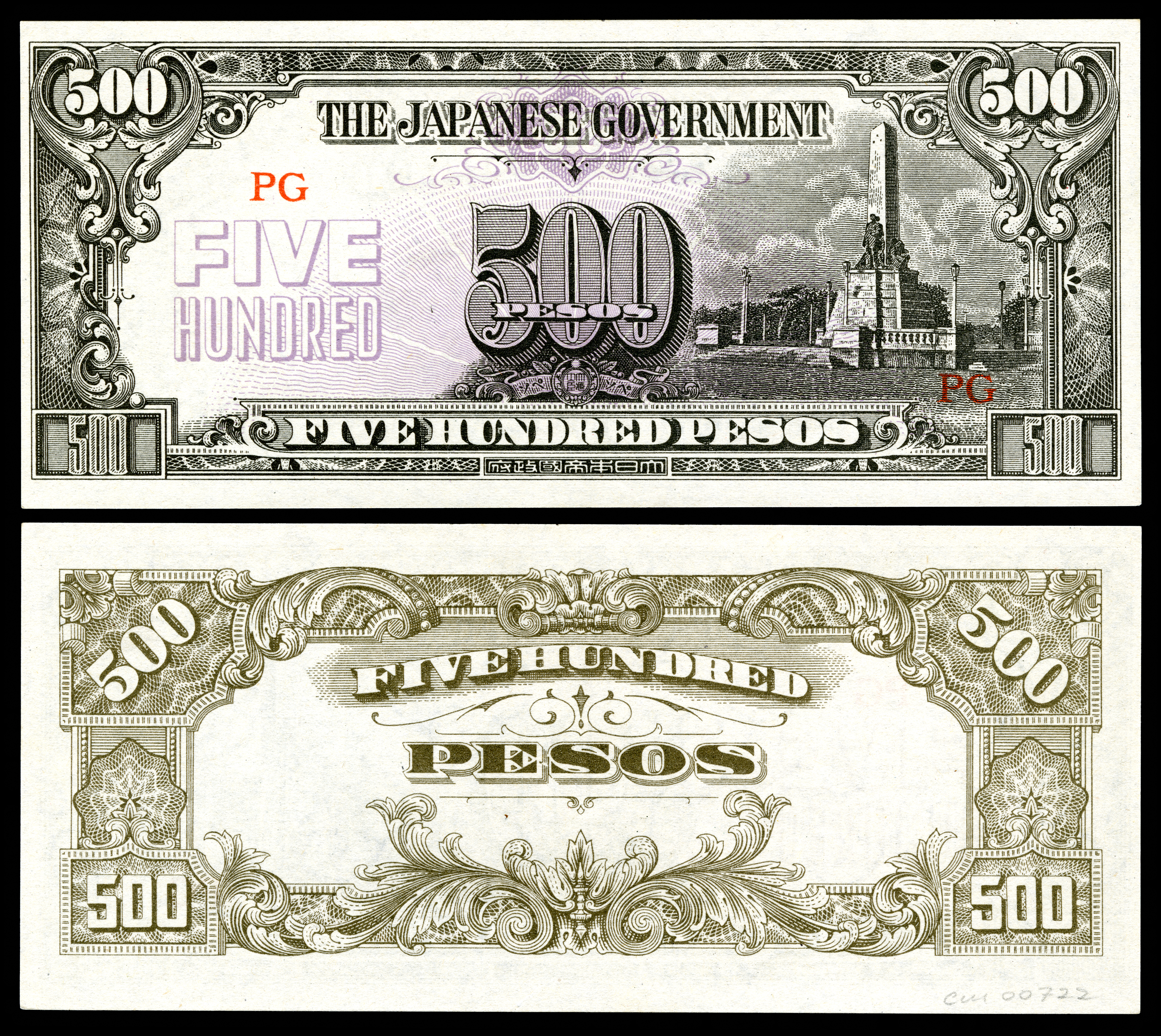
Japanese Invasion Money – Philippines 500 Pesos

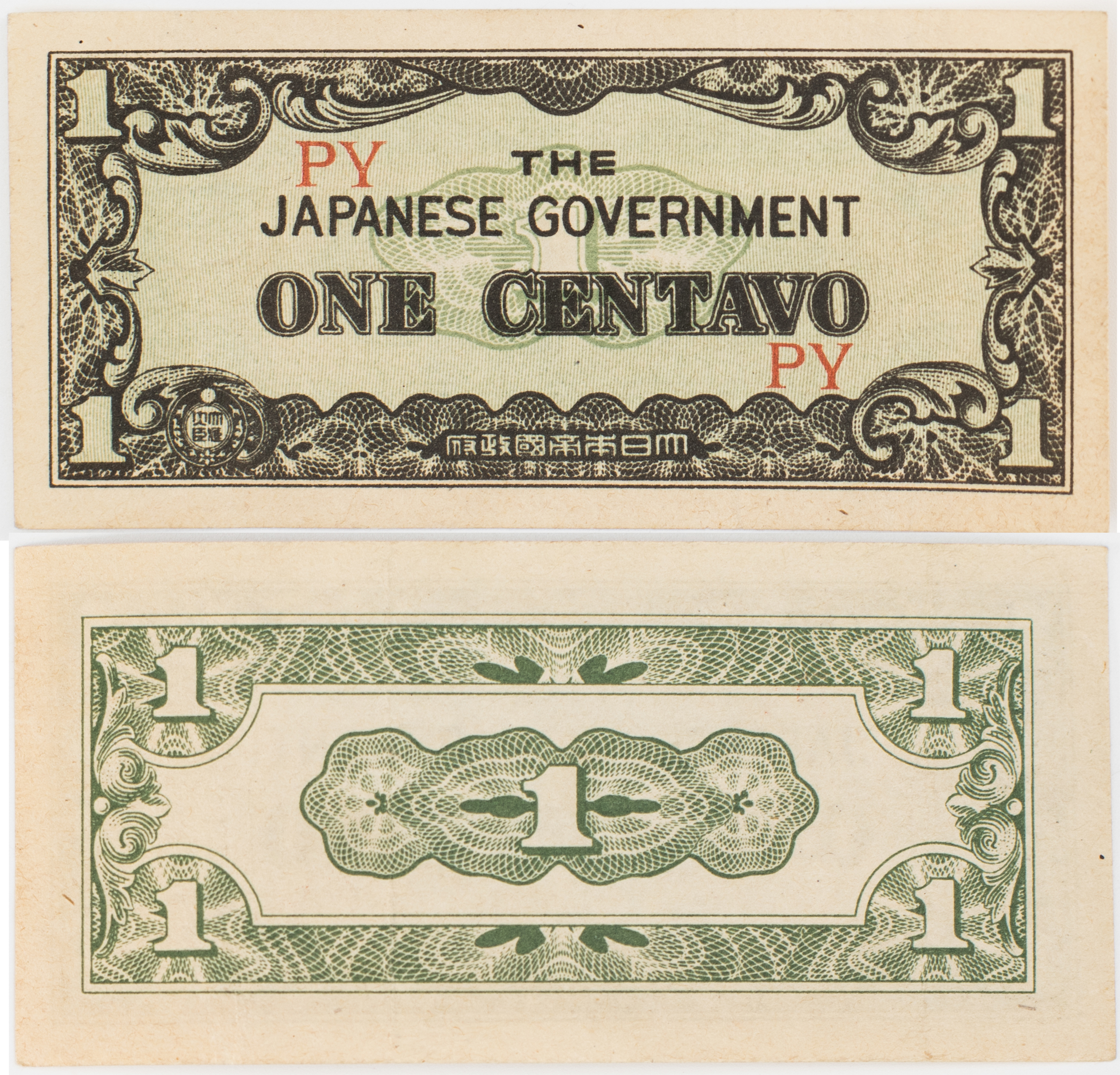
Japanese Philippines One Centavo WWII Occupation Note

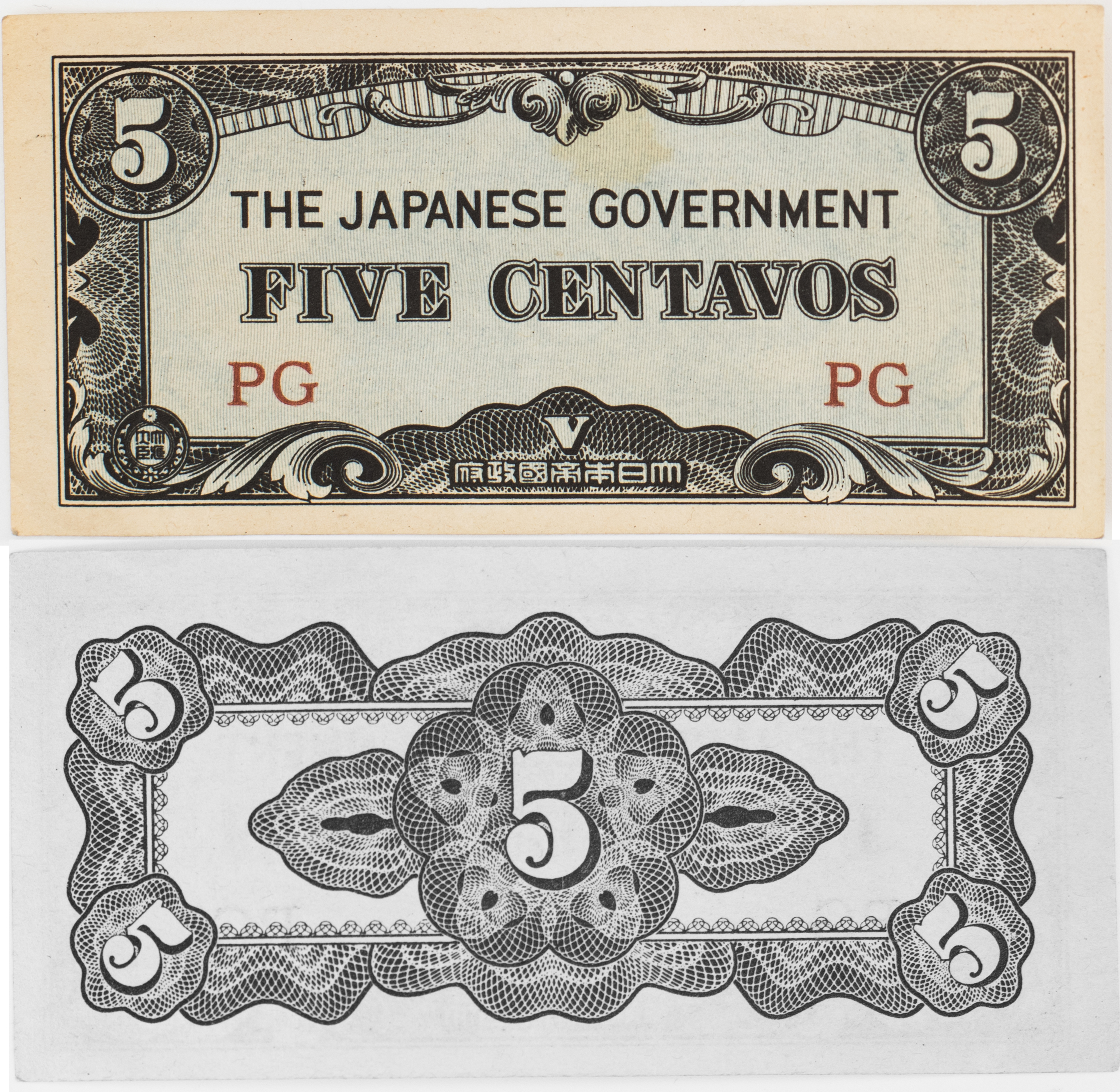
Japanese Philippines Five Centavos WWII Occupation Note

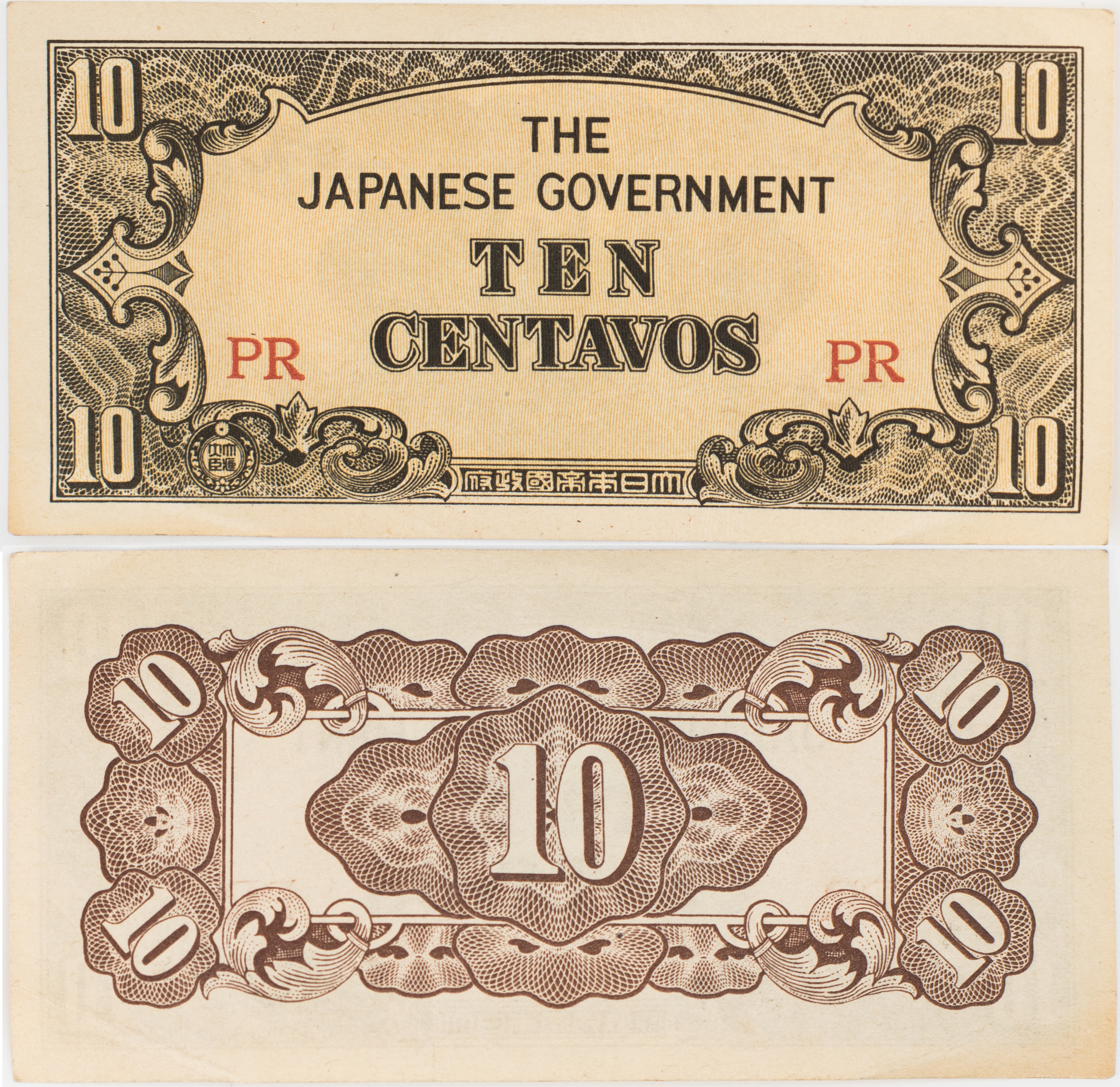
Japanese Philippines Ten Centavos WWII Occupation Note

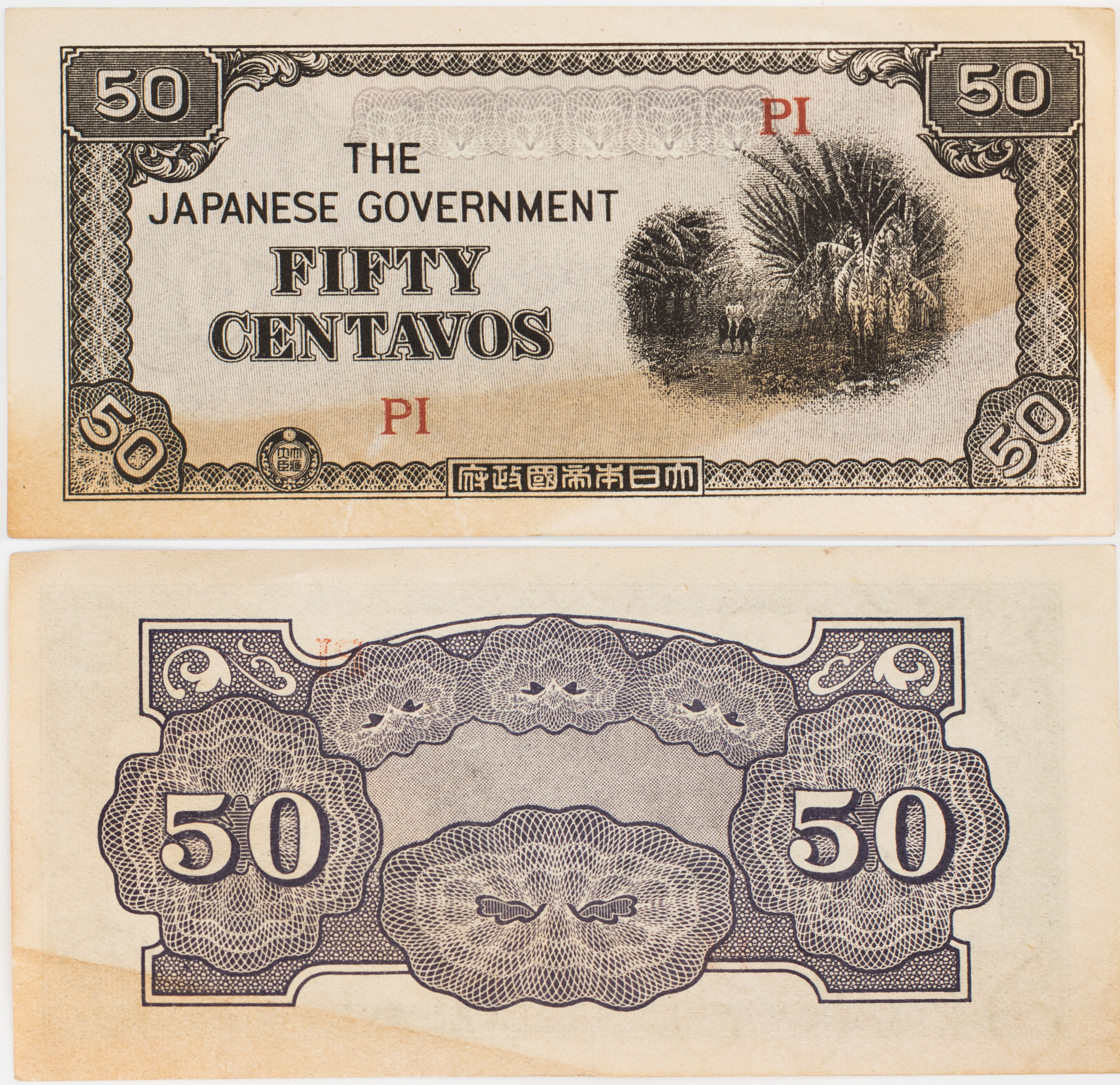
Japanese Philippines 50 Centavos WWII Occupation Note

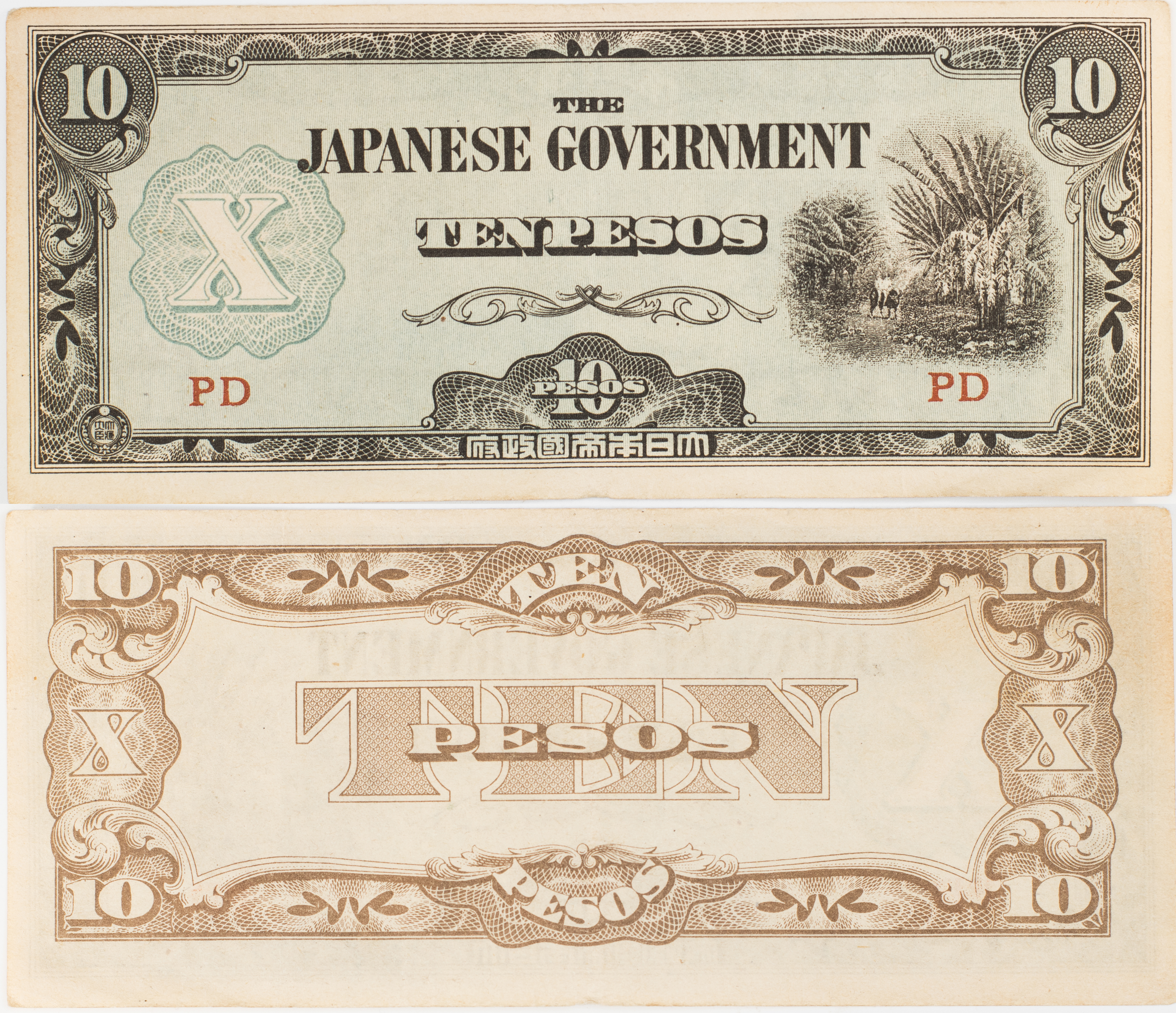
Japanese Philippines Ten Pesos WWII Occupation Note

== Malaya, Singapore, North Borneo, Sarawak and Brunei ==
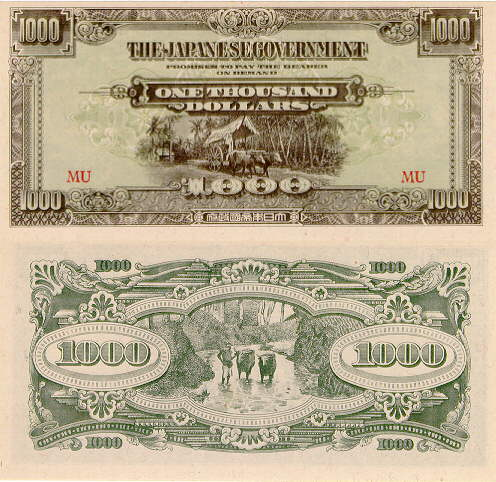
Japanese invasion money issued in Malaya.

The Japanese began their attack on British Malaya the same day as Pearl Harbor. The Japanese entered Malaya overland from the north and the fortified base of Singapore fell on 15 February 1942 and was held with the rest of Malaya by the Japanese until August 1945. Malaysian scrip is in dollars (Straits or Malayan dollars) and therefore is often, mistakenly, thought to be for the invasion of the United States. In 1942 the Japanese issued paper scrip currency of 1, 5, 10 and 50 cents and 1, 5 and 10 dollars. The 1, 5 and 10-dollar notes initially had serial numbers; these were later omitted.

In 1944, inflation led to the issuing of a 100-dollar note. In 1945, a replacement note 100-dollar bill was issued as well as a hyper-inflation 1,000 note. The 1942 series of notes, including the 50c and 1, 5, 10, and the 1944/45 100-dollar all contained the text [The Japanese Government] "Promises To Pay The Bearer on Demand". The 1944 100-dollar replacement note no longer contained this message.

With metals being a needed war-material the Japanese did not issue coinage during their occupations. Occupation currency, including denominations of less than one dollar, was printed on paper. However, the Money Museum of the Bank Negara Malaysia in Kuala Lumpur has on display a pattern coin showing that occupation coinage was considered. The pattern on display is a 20-cent aluminum pattern coin inscribed on the obverse with the name MALAYSIA, and the date 2602, which translated from the Japanese calendar is 1942 A.D. Inscribed on the reverse is a typical Japanese design of a sun ray with sakura flowers, with 20 CENTS at the top.

The name MALAYSIA was used on a pattern coin of 1942. The name for this country was not officially changed from 'Malaya' to 'Malaysia' until 16 September 1963. However, the latter name had been in common use since the 19th century, and the Osaka Finance Ministry in Japan has verified that this pattern coin had been minted at the Osaka Mint, and that the name MALAYSIA was the Japanese name for that region, at that time.

== Burma ==
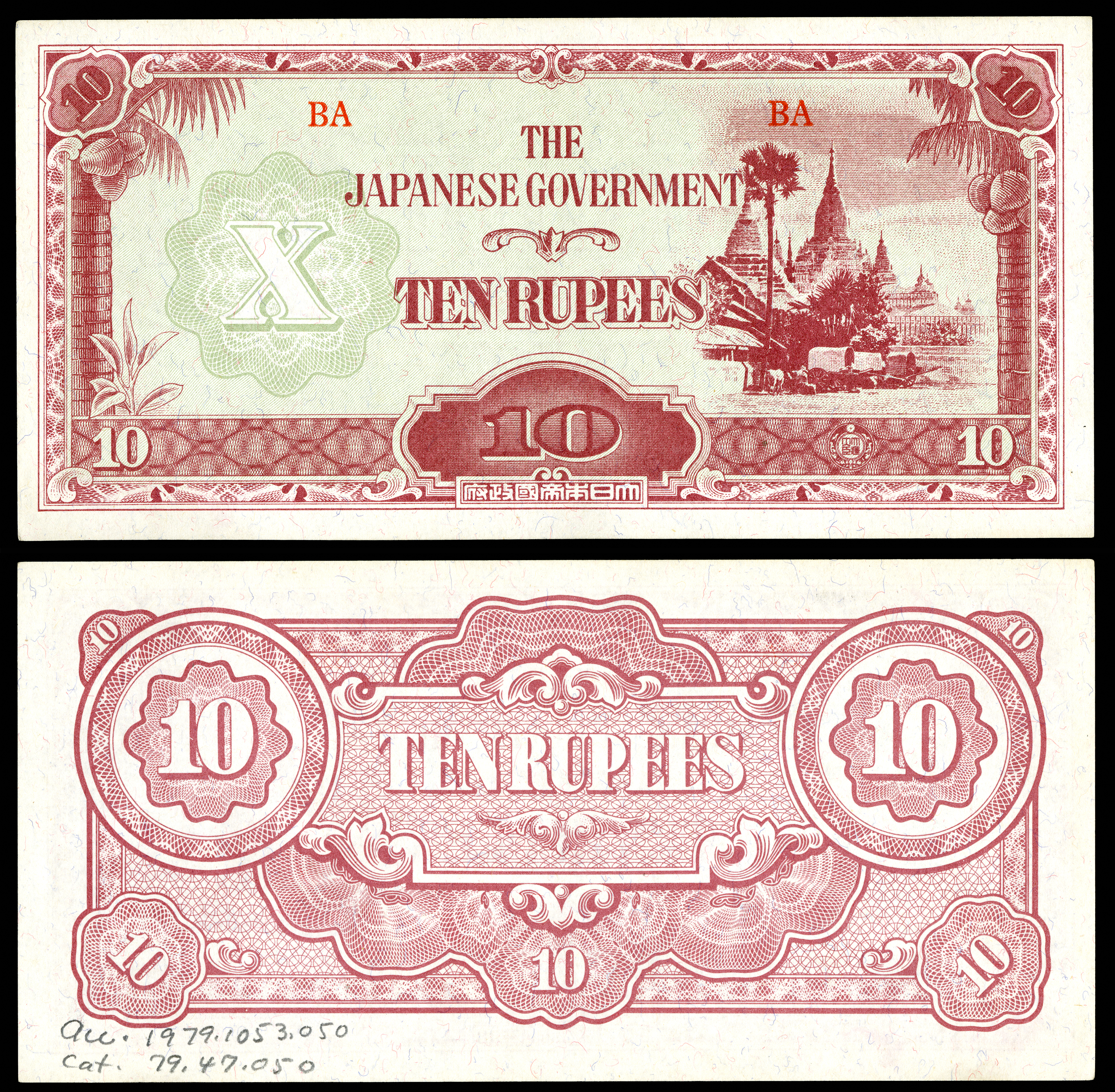
10 Rupees, Japanese Invasion Money – Burma

The Japanese invaded Burma in January 1942. They conquered Mandalay on 21 May 1942, forcing the British to retreat into India. The Japanese held Burma until the second Allied campaign of 1944; although an official surrender did not take place until August 1945. In 1942 the Japanese issued paper scrip currency of 1, 5 and 10 cents and 1/4, 1/2, 1, 5 and 10 Rupees.

In 1943, the Japanese commuted the sentence of Dr. Ba Maw, an outspoken advocate for Burmese self-rule, and installed him as the head of the puppet government. From 1943 onward the Japanese issued paper scrip currency of 1, 5 and 10 Rupee with a 100 Rupee note in 1944. The Japanese characters in the oblong box at the bottom of each note read "Government of Great Imperial Japan" and the contents of the seal at the lower right of the note comprise the Japanese symbol for the Minister of Finance.

== Dutch (or Netherlands) East Indies ==
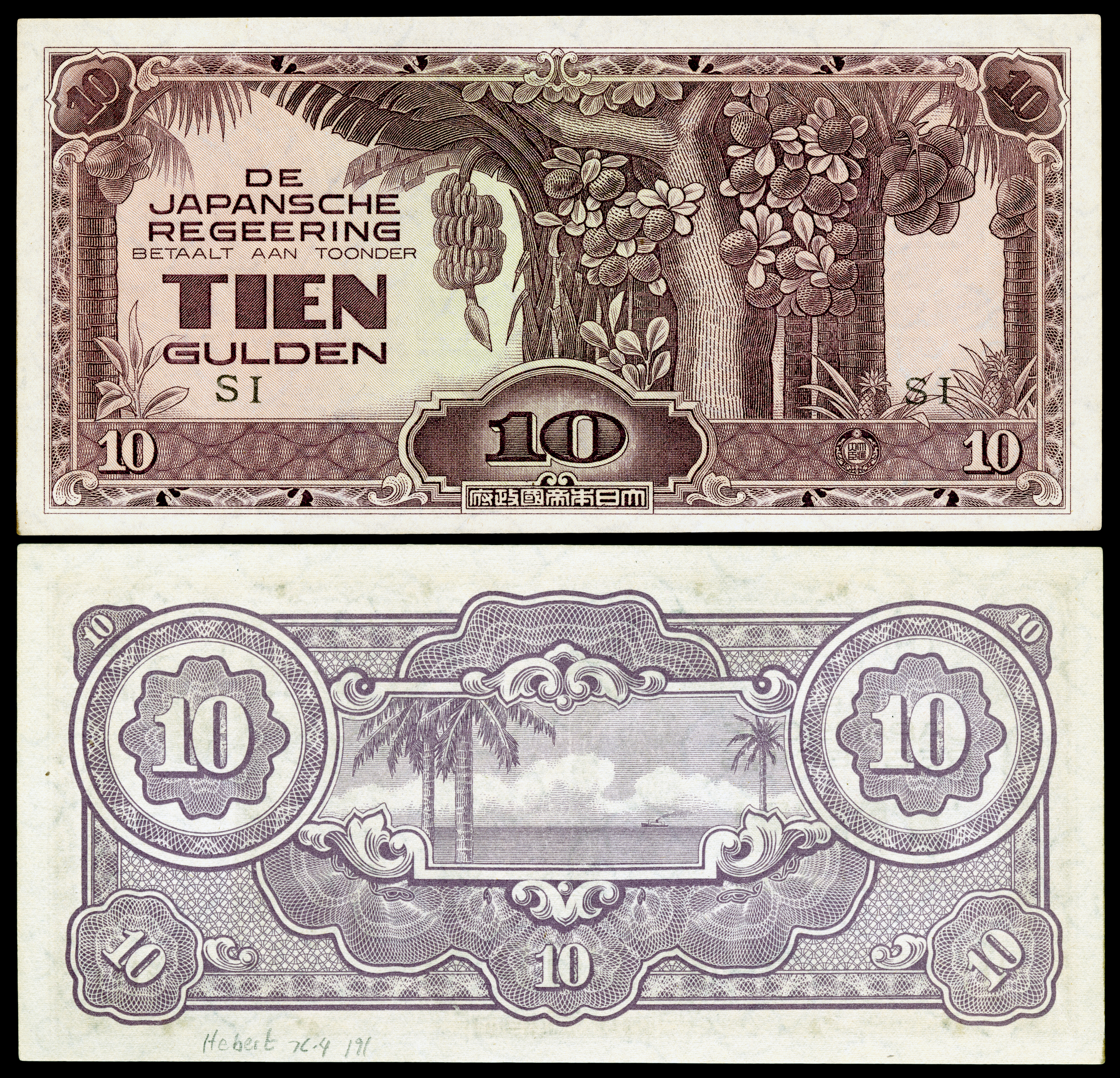
Netherlands Indies-Japanese Occupation-10 Gulden (1942)

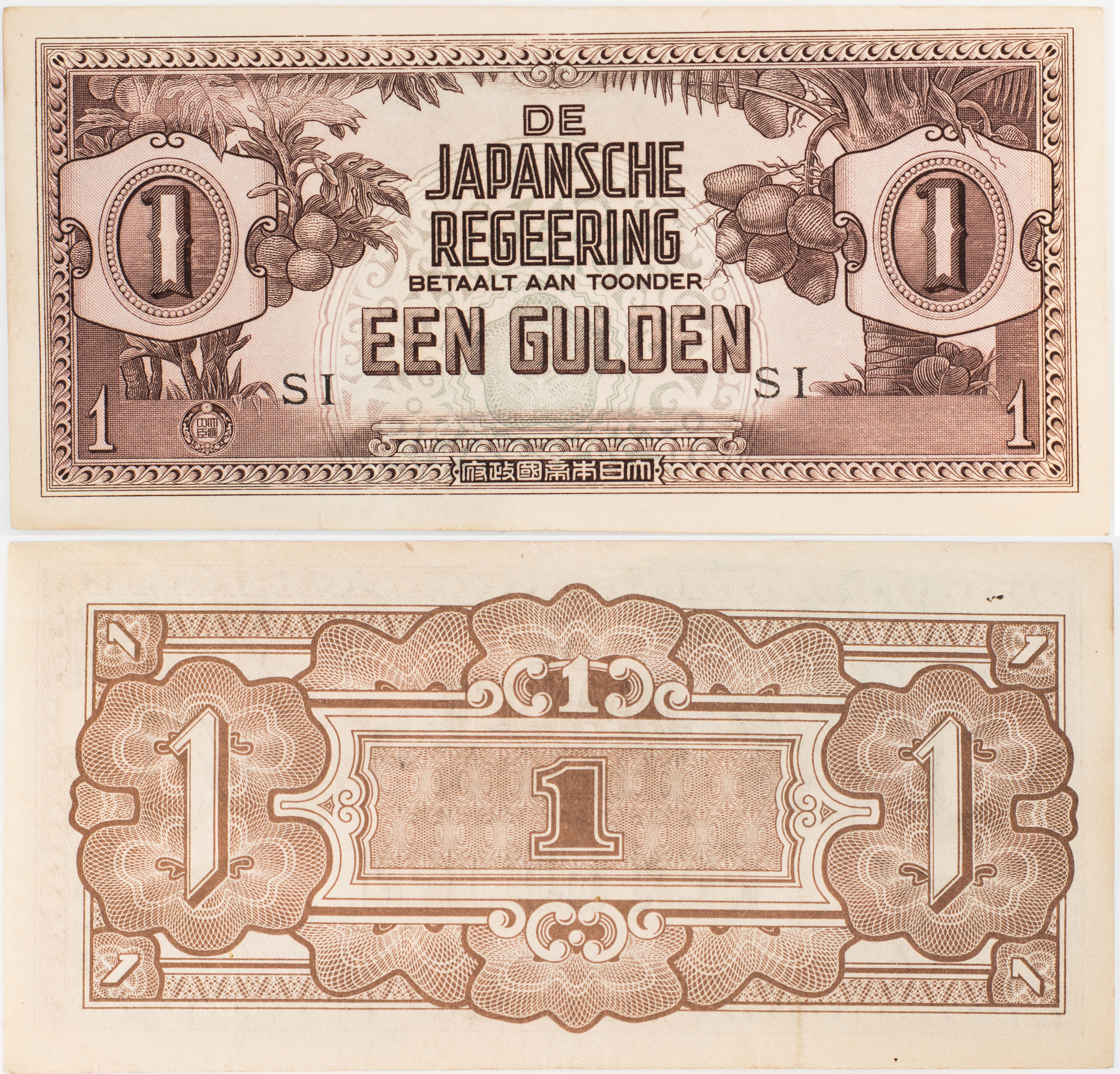
Japanese One Gulden WWII Netherlands Indies Occupation Note

After the fall of Singapore in February 1942, the Japanese attacked the Netherlands Indies which were effectively overtaken by 9 March 1942 and held until surrender in August 1945. In 1942, the Japanese issued paper scrip currency of 1, 5 and 10 cents and 1/2, 1, 5 and 10 Gulden notes. These notes are written entirely in Dutch. Values are Een (1), Vijf (5) and Tien (10) cents and Gulden.

All of these notes bear the following "De Japansche Regeering Betaalt Aan Toonder" or "The Japanese Government Promise To Pay The Bearer on Demand". Denominations of 100 and 1000 Roepiah were issued in 1944, with the Indonesian legend "Pemerintah Dai Nippon" (Japanese Government). An additional series, with denominations of 1/2, 1, 5, 10 and 100 Roepiah, was also issued in 1944 with the transliterated Japanese legend "Dai Nippon Teikoku Seiku" (Imperial Japanese Government).

== Oceania ==
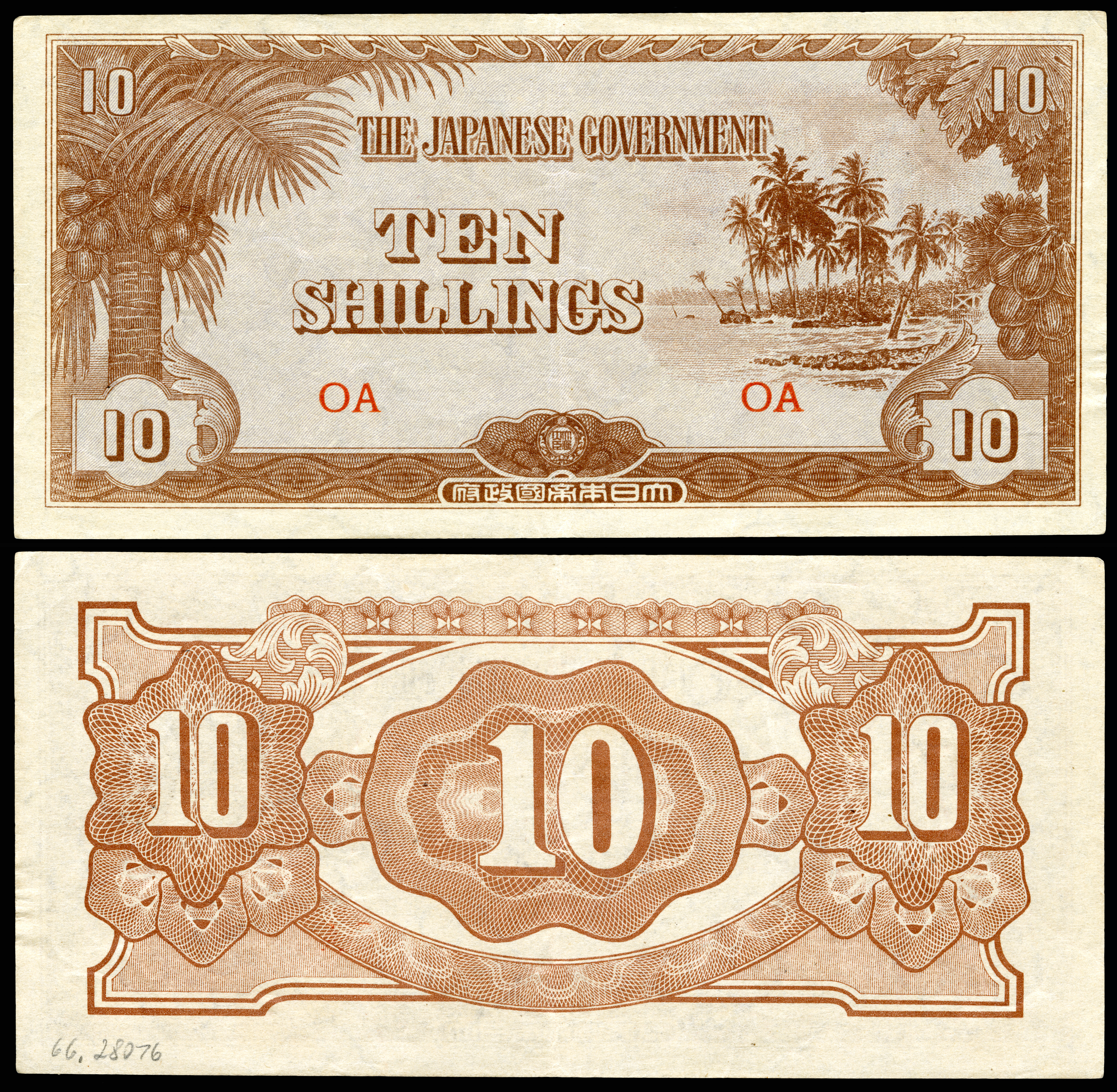
Oceania-Japanese invasion- 10 Shillings ND (1942)

In Oceania, invasion money was issued for use in the Japanese-occupied Territory of New Guinea, Solomon Islands, Gilbert Islands and other small island outposts. These islands were captured in order to defend the islands within the Co-Prosperity Sphere. In 1942 the Japanese issued a 1 and a 1/2 shilling notes for use in these areas. This money is sometimes wrongly identified as being printed in preparation for an invasion of Australia; an invasion was proposed by the Imperial Japanese Navy in 1942, but wasn't carried out, and this denomination was not used in Australia. however, it was enough of a scare at the time to raise concerns.

== Propaganda notes ==
The U.S. prepared a propaganda parody of the 5 rupee banknote issued for use in Burma from 1942 to 1944. The original note is dark purple with a yellow background. The American propaganda parody is similar on the front. The back bears two propaganda messages in the Kachin, a Burmese warrior tribe, language.

It reads: "The Japanese Military Government commanded their troops in Burma to keep the following directives secret. The Military Government is issuing currency notes for your [the Japanese] use in Burma. Spend as much as you like for food and other things, but don't tell the (Kachin) people the secret of the money. Kachin! The Japanese are making these valueless notes for your use. It is easy to get these notes but very hard to buy food or other things. Avoid these notes or you will be cheated".

== Counterfeit notes ==
The U.S. counterfeited notes throughout the war partly in an attempt to destabilize the local economy, thereby demoralizing the Japanese, and to supply guerillas fighting the Japanese. General MacArthur asked the Office of Strategic Services (OSS) to replicate the Japanese currency in the Philippines for his eventual return. By luck, a supply of paper made from plants native to Japan was located in the U.S.

When that supply was exhausted the counterfeiting operation was transferred to Australia. In 1943 MacArthur requested and received the following counterfeited notes; five million 10-Peso notes, three million 5-Peso notes, one and a half million 1-Peso notes and five hundred thousand 50 centavo notes. The American forgeries are known to have the following block letter codes:

50 Centavo bills – PA, PB, PE, PF, PG, PH and PI 1 Peso bills – PH 5 Peso bills – PD 10 Peso bills – PA, PB, and PC

The OSS and SOE also counterfeited the 10 Rupee Burmese note, identifiable by the back slit on a part of the design

Counterfeit Japanese Invasion Money was produced by the Commonwealth Bank, at the time Australia's central bank. Recently discovered correspondence from the Netherlands Indies Commission to the Governor, Commonwealth Bank, on 5 October 1942 shows a request of nearly 70,000 pieces of counterfeit scrip in varying denominations. A follow-up letter three months later has a request for another 70,000 pieces of counterfeit scrip as the previous supply "proved to be very useful" and was exhausted.

== Aftermath ==
One-peso occupation note bearing a postwar JAPWANCAP stamp.

After World War II, an organization called "The Japanese War Notes Claimants Association of the Philippines, Inc." (JAPWANCAP) was founded on 8 January 1953. Its purpose was to pressure the Philippine and U.S. governments to redeem or pay a fraction of the value of the Japanese military issues of currency for the Philippines. The Association held the notes, issued membership certificates, official ID cards, and deposit passbooks. These certificates were issued for a fee.

The Filipino legislature was not interested in pursuing the matter and nothing came of it. In 1967, JAPWANCAP sued the United States government for reciprocity and lost. Court battles against Japan were active until recently, with cases going to Japan's highest courts.

Due to Allied counterfeiting, many people who lived under Japanese occupation blamed the Allies for the hyperinflation.

To date, no person issued Japanese invasion money in place of their own money has been awarded compensation. Pursuant to the Treaty of San Francisco, signed in September 1951, Japan made restitution on a national, not individual, level.

Large amounts of Japanese invasion money were collected by individuals following the war. Most issues can be purchased cheaply for their numismatic value by collectors.

== See also ==
- Hawaii overprint note
- Indonesian rupiah
- Japanese military currency (1937–1945)
