= Rupee (disambiguation) =

Rupee is a variety of currency units used in several economies.

Rupee or rupia may also refer to:

== Present currencies ==
- Indian rupee
- Indonesian rupiah
- Sri Lankan rupee
- Mauritian rupee
- Nepalese rupee
- Pakistani rupee
- Seychellois rupee

== Former (obsolete) currencies ==
- Afghan rupee
- Bhutanese rupee
- Burmese rupee
- Danish Indian rupee
- East African rupee
- French Indian rupee
- Gulf rupee
- Hyderabadi rupee
- Italian Somaliland rupia
- Javan rupee
- Portuguese Indian rúpia
- Travancore rupee
- Zanzibari rupee

== Other uses ==
- Rupee (musician), a soca musician from Barbados
- Rupee (The Legend of Zelda), a fictional currency in The Legend of Zelda

== See also ==
- Bangladeshi taka
- Bhutanese ngultrum, pegged to the Indian rupee
- German East African rupie
- History of the rupee
- Indonesian rupiah
- Maldivian rufiyaa
- Netherlands Indian roepiah
- Riau rupiah
- West Irian rupiah
