= Zanzibari rupee =

Currency of Zanzibar from 1908 to 1935

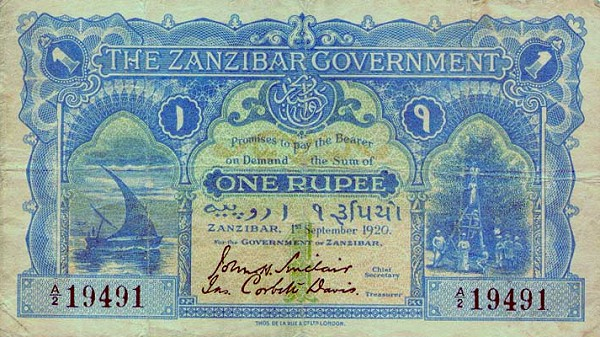
Zanzibar 1 Rupee banknote 1920.

The rupee (Arabic: روبية [ruːbija]) was the currency of Zanzibar from 1908 to 31 December 1935. It was subdivided into 100 cents (سنت [sɪnt]).

== History ==
The rupee replaced the Zanzibari ryal at a rate of 2 1/8 rupees = 1 ryal and was equivalent to the Indian rupee, which was also in circulation. The Zanzibari rupee remained equal to the Indian rupee and was replaced on January 1, 1936, by the East African shilling at the rate of 1 1/2 East African shillings = 1 Zanzibari rupee.

== Coins ==
Bronze coins were introduced in 1908 in denominations of 1 and 10 cents, together with nickel 20 cents. No further issues of coins were made.

== Banknotes ==
In 1908, banknotes were introduced by the government of Zanzibar in denominations of 5, 10, 20, and 100 rupees. 50- and 500-rupee notes were added in 1916, and 1-rupee notes were issued in 1920. All Zanzibari notes were withdrawn in 1936. All of these notes are very rare and valuable.

Preceded by: Indian rupee and Zanzibari ryal Ratio: at par with Indian rupee, and 2 1/8 rupees = 1 ryal	Currency of Zanzibar; 1908 – December 31, 1935; Concurrent with: East African rupee until 1920, East African florin 1920-1921 and East African shilling starting 1922. The Indian rupee and Maria Theresa thaler were also in use during this period	Succeeded by: East African shilling Ratio: 1 1/2 East African shillings = 1 Zanzibari rupee = 1 Indian rupee = 1 1/2 British shillings
