= Madras fanam =

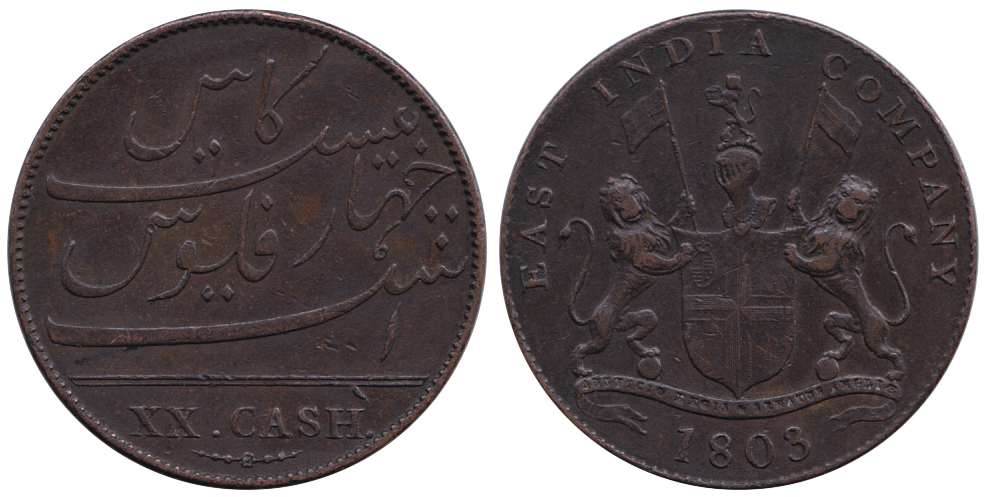
Coin XX cash (1/4 fanam) 1803. East India Company, Madras Presidency

The fanam (or panam in the local language of Tamil) was a currency issued by the Madras Presidency until 1815. It circulated alongside the Indian rupee, also issued by the Presidency. The fanam was a small silver coin, subdivided into 80 copper cash, with the gold pagoda worth 42 fanams. The rupee was worth 12 fanams. After 1815, only coins of the rupee currency system were issued.

== Conversion table ==
Pagoda	Rupees	Fanams	Cash
1	3½	42	3360
	1	12	960
		1	80

Fanams were also issued in Travancore, worth 1/7 of a rupee, whilst in Danish India the fano was issued, worth 1/8 rupee, and in French India the fanon was issued, worth 1/8 rupee.

== See also ==
- French Indian rupee
- Danish Indian rupee
- Portuguese Indian rupia
