= Indonesian rupiah =

Currency of Indonesia

Rupiah (Indonesian)
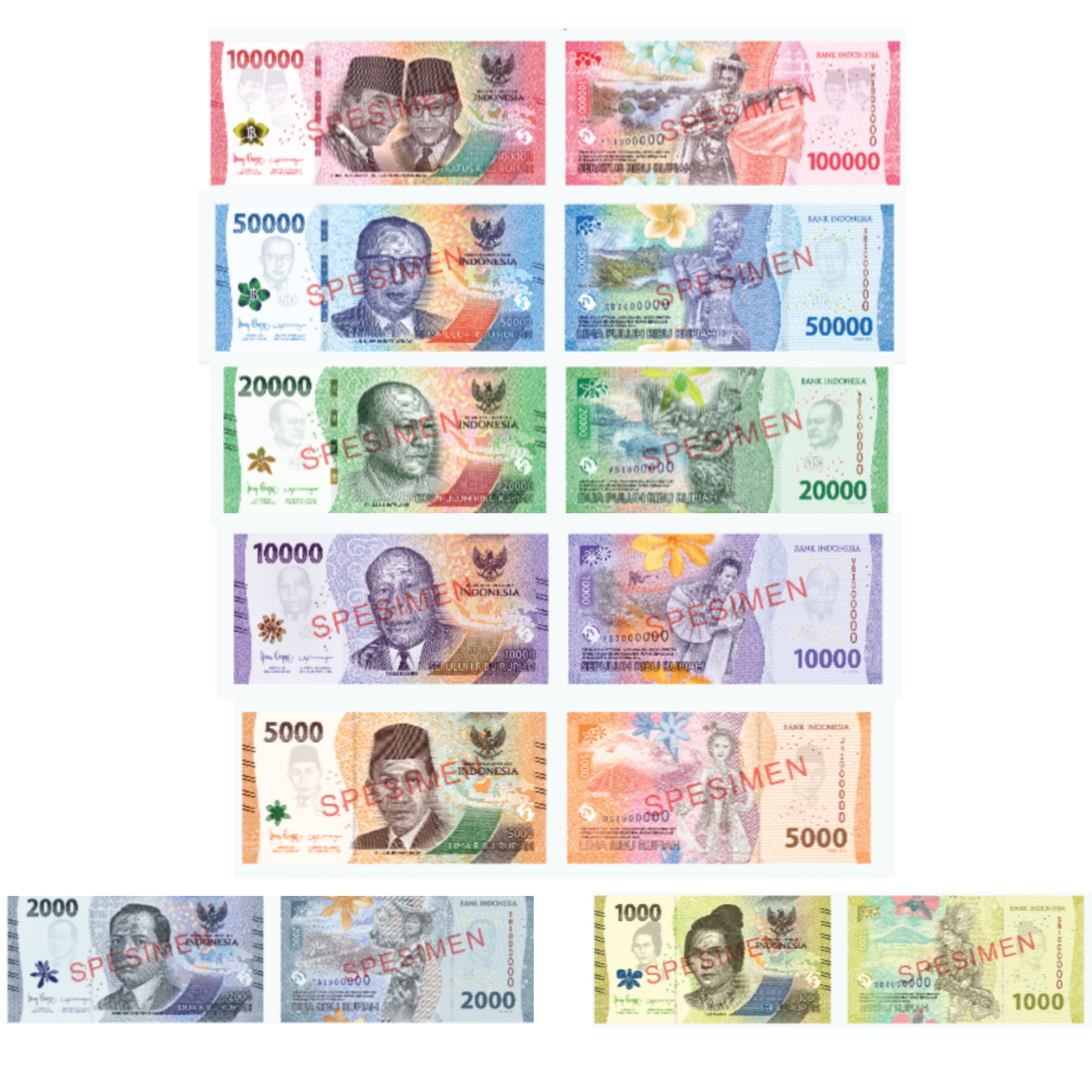
- 2022-series rupiah banknotes

ISO 4217
- Code: IDR (numeric: 360)
- Subunit: 0.01

Units of account
- Plural: The language(s) of this currency do(es) not have a morphological plural distinction.
- Symbol: Rp
- Subunit
- 1/100: sen (cents) (Note: Although it is no longer in practical use, financial reports and bank statements still record monetary amounts up to the cent (e.g. Rp1.234,56 – Indonesian uses comma as decimal separator).)

Denominations
- Banknotes
- Freq. used: Rp1,000, Rp2,000, Rp5,000, Rp10,000, Rp20,000, Rp50,000, Rp100,000
- Rarely used: Rp0.01, Rp75,000 (commemorative)
- Coins
- Freq. used: Rp100, Rp200, Rp500, Rp1000
- Rarely used: Rp1, Rp50

Demographics
- Official user(s): Indonesia
- Unofficial user: Timor-Leste

Issuance
- Central bank: Bank Indonesia
- Printer: Perum Peruri
- Mint: Perum Peruri

Valuation
- Inflation: 3.19%
- Source: 2026
- Method: CPI

The rupiah (pronounced [ruˈpi.ah]; symbol: Rp; currency code: IDR) is the official currency and sole legal tender in Indonesia. It is issued and managed by Bank Indonesia, while its banknotes and coins are produced by the state-owned Perum Peruri. The name derives from the Sanskrit rupya, meaning "wrought silver". One rupiah is legally divided into 100 sen, although regular currency is issued only in whole-rupiah denominations.

The republican government introduced Oeang Republik Indonesia (ORI) in October 1946 during the Indonesian National Revolution, while Japanese and Dutch-issued currencies were still in circulation. Temporary regional currencies were also issued during the revolution. Separate rupiahs were later used in the Riau Islands and West Irian, before being replaced by the national currency in 1964 and 1971, respectively. The government redenominated the rupiah in 1965 at a rate of 1,000 old rupiah to one new rupiah, and Bank Indonesia became the sole issuer of banknotes and coins in 1968.

Indonesia used multiple exchange rates, fixed rates and managed depreciation before allowing the rupiah to float during the 1997 Asian financial crisis. The rupiah fell to about Rp16,800 per US dollar in June 1998 and later recovered. Since then, it has depreciated sharply several times under the floating system. Proposals to remove three zeroes from the currency have not been implemented. Bank Indonesia is also developing a digital rupiah through Project Garuda.

== Name, notation, and legal status ==
The name rupiah derives from the Sanskrit rupya, meaning "wrought silver". Its symbol, Rp, is placed before the amount. In Indonesian writing, the symbol has no full stop or intervening space, while full stops separate thousands and a comma precedes decimal fractions; an amount may therefore be written as Rp50.000,00. Bank Indonesia's English-language material uses English number punctuation, as in Rp50,000. The ISO 4217 currency code is IDR. Indonesian law divides one rupiah into 100 sen, although the regular 2016 and 2022 issues use only whole-rupiah denominations.

The rupiah is Indonesia's currency. It is issued and circulated by Bank Indonesia, and must generally be used for both cash and non-cash transactions conducted in Indonesia. Businesses must also state prices for goods and services in rupiah. Exceptions include specified state-budget transactions, international trade and financing, grants to or from abroad, foreign-currency bank deposits and transactions otherwise permitted by law. Valid rupiah may not normally be refused, except when its authenticity is in doubt or a permitted foreign-currency settlement has been agreed in writing.

Earlier notes and coins remain legal tender until Bank Indonesia formally withdraws the particular issue. The rupiah is also used informally in Timor-Leste; the United States dollar is Timor-Leste's official currency and legal tender for cash payments.

== Currency in circulation ==
=== Coins ===
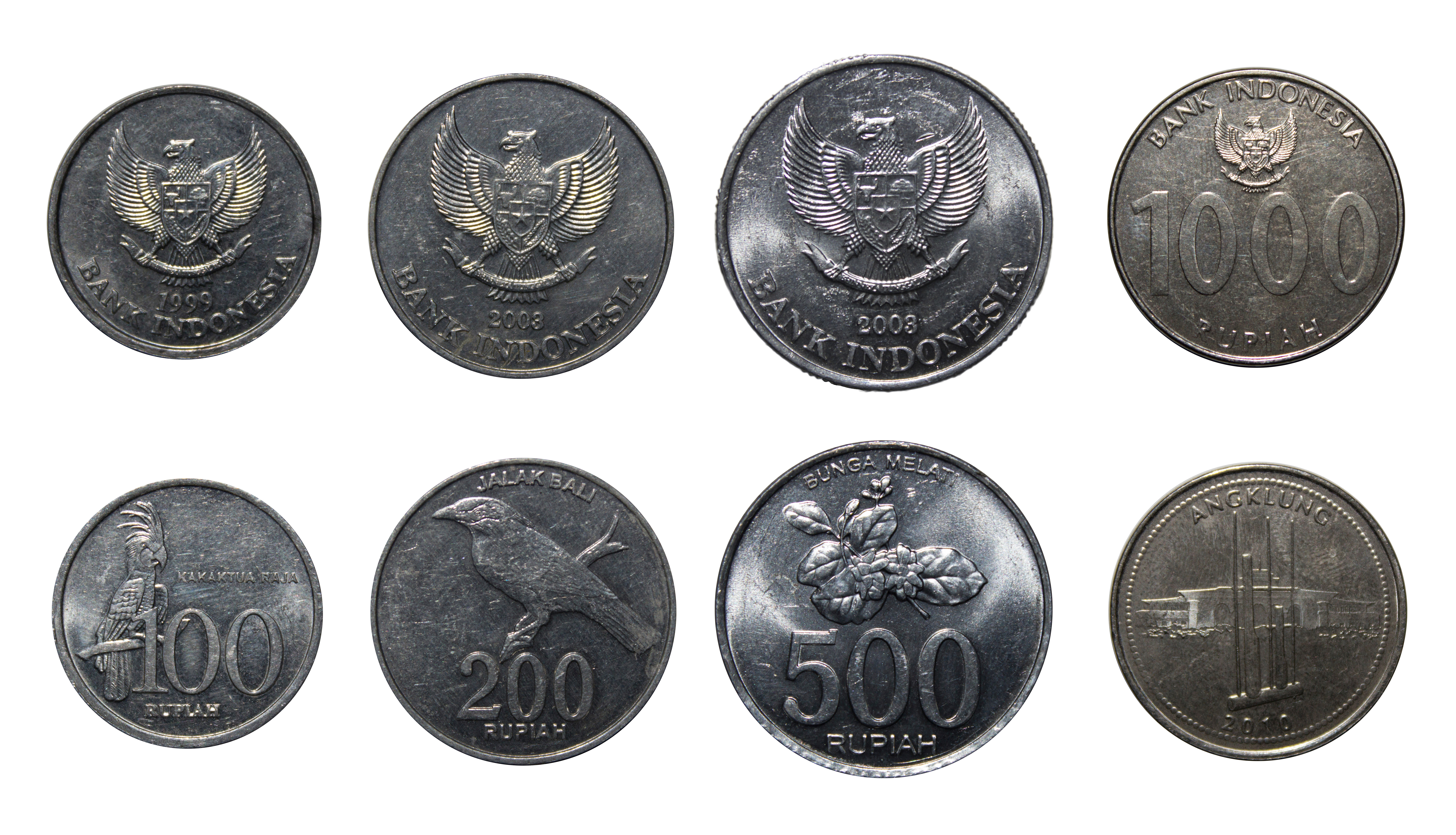
Circulating rupiah coins from the 1999, 2003, and 2010 series.

Bank Indonesia's current currency catalogue lists ordinary coins in denominations of Rp1, Rp50, Rp100, Rp200, Rp500 and Rp1,000. The current series consists of Rp100, Rp200, Rp500 and Rp1,000 coins, which entered circulation on 19 December 2016. Each of the four coins depicts a national hero. They were issued with seven banknotes as part of the 2016 series. Earlier issues did not automatically cease to be legal tender when the series was introduced. By value, Rp500 and Rp1,000 coins together accounted for about 84% of coins in circulation in May 2026; Bank Indonesia groups Rp100 and lower denominations together in its circulation statistics.

The Rp1 coin issued in 1970 and the Rp50 coin issued in 1999 remain legal tender, although neither denomination was included in the 2016 series. Bank Indonesia withdrew the Rp500 coin issued in 1991, the Rp1,000 coin issued in 1993 and the Rp500 coin issued in 1997 on 1 December 2023; later Rp500 and Rp1,000 issues remain listed in its current currency catalogue. Bank Indonesia has also issued commemorative coins for anniversaries and other special purposes. These are rupiah issues but are catalogued separately from ordinary coinage; several older commemorative series have since been withdrawn.

=== Banknotes ===
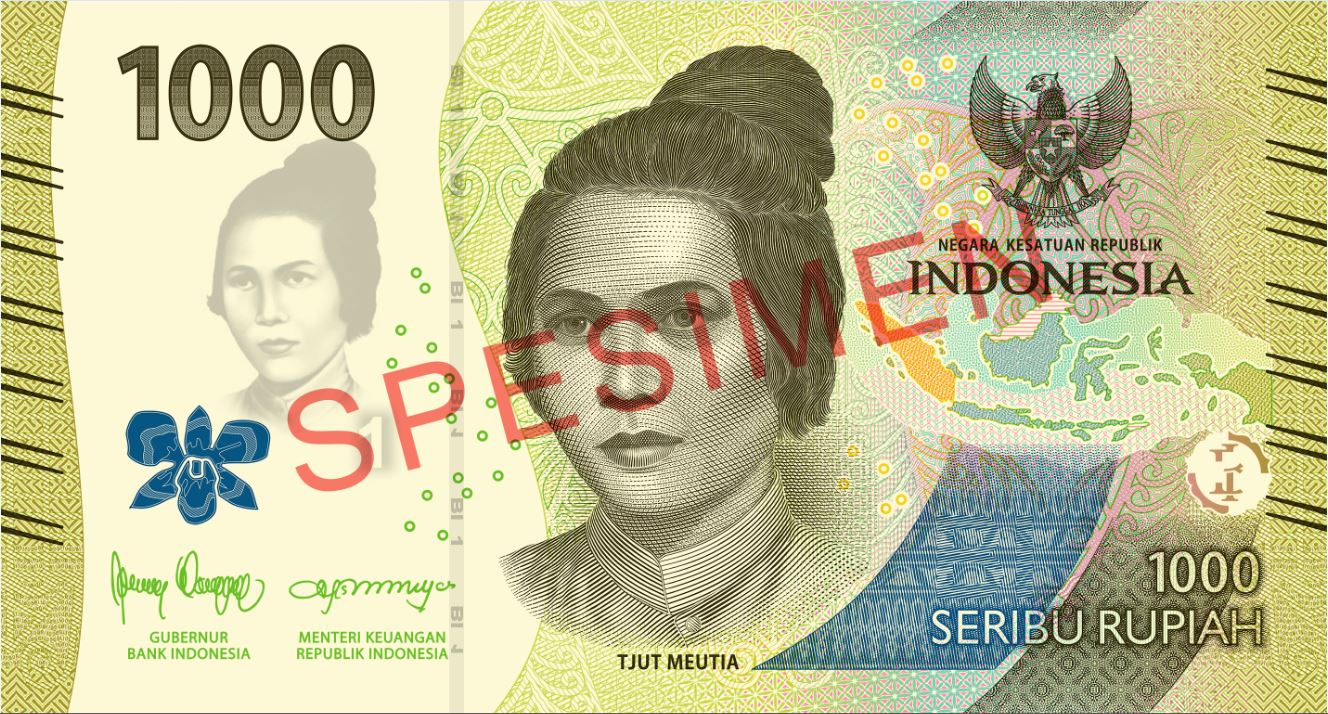
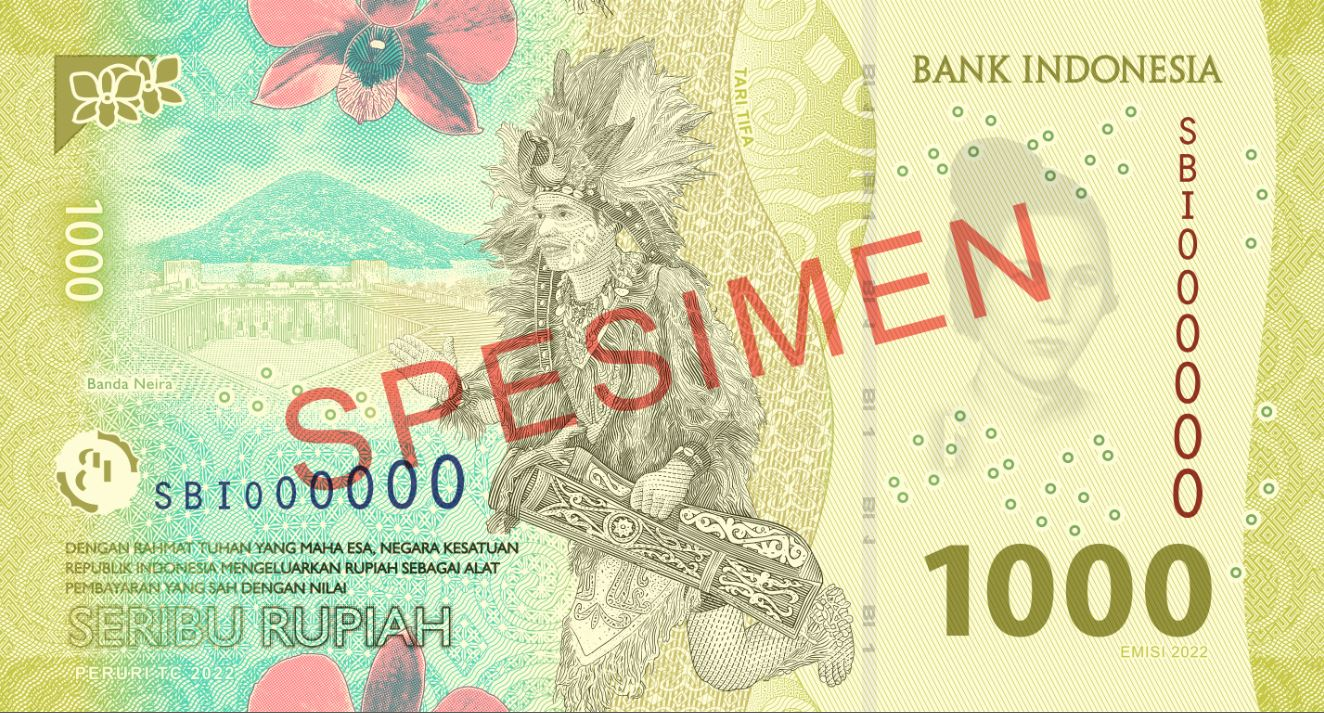
Rupiah banknotes generally depict Indonesian national heroes on the obverse and traditional dances, natural scenery and flora on the reverse.

The current regular series consists of seven denominations: Rp1,000, Rp2,000, Rp5,000, Rp10,000, Rp20,000, Rp50,000 and Rp100,000. Bank Indonesia launched the series on 18 August 2022, with the notes officially issued and placed into circulation on 17 August. Their obverses retain the national heroes shown on the 2016 series, while the reverses depict traditional dances, natural scenery and Indonesian flora.

The introduction of the 2022 series did not withdraw earlier banknotes. The complete 2016 series and several older issues remain legal tender and are listed alongside the 2022 notes in Bank Indonesia's currency catalogue. More than one design of the same denomination may therefore remain valid at the same time. A banknote ceases to be legal tender only after Bank Indonesia formally revokes and withdraws its particular issue; the bank announces each withdrawal and the period during which the notes may be exchanged.

Bank Indonesia also issues commemorative banknotes separately from the regular series. On 17 August 2020, it issued an Rp75,000 note for the 75th anniversary of Indonesian independence. The note features Sukarno and Mohammad Hatta, together with images representing the proclamation of independence, Indonesia's cultural diversity and its future development. It is legal tender throughout Indonesia and was the fourth commemorative banknote issued for an independence anniversary, following issues in 1970, 1990 and 1995.

=== Production and security features ===
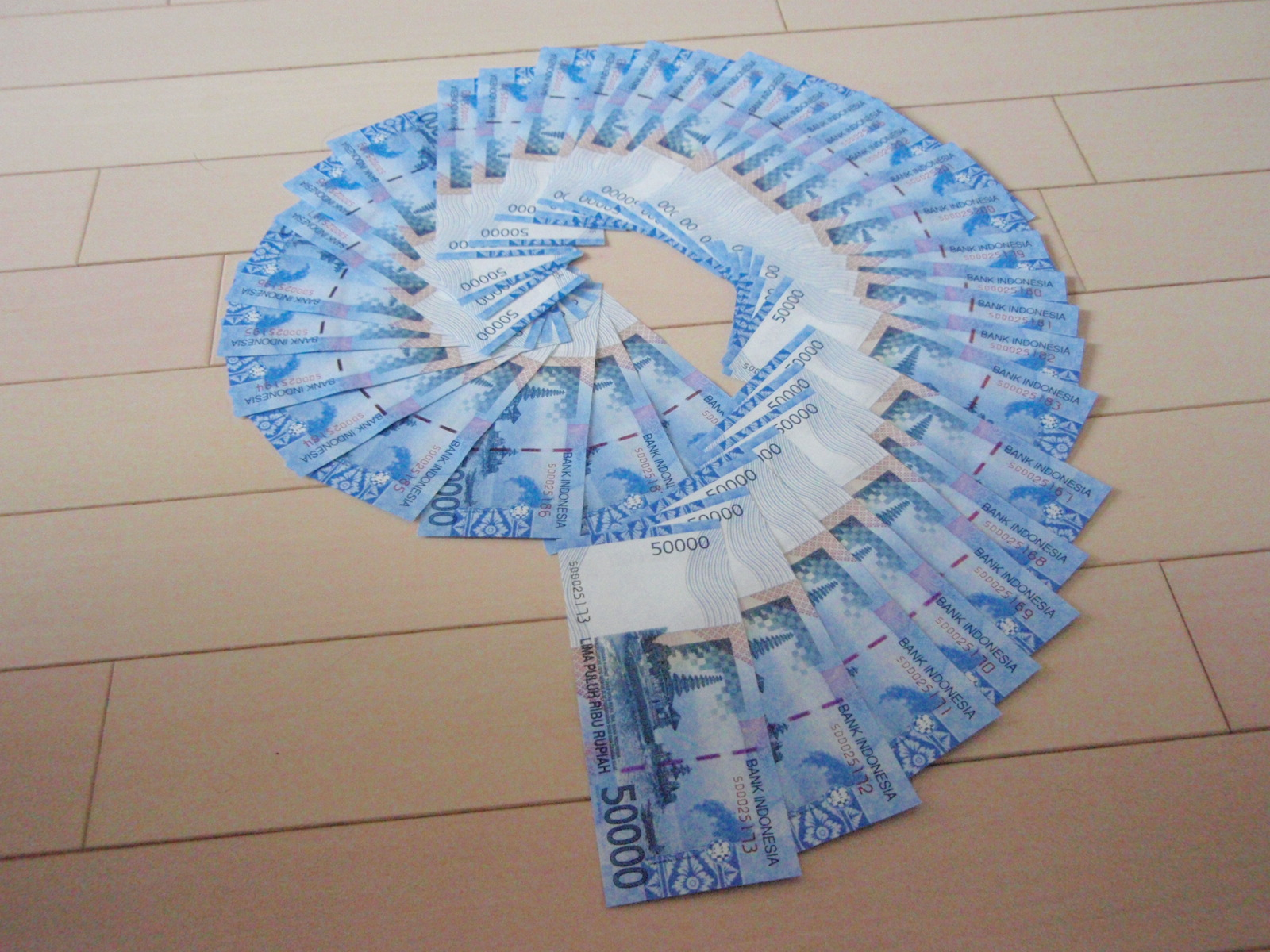
A collection of 2011-issue Rp50,000 notes showing their security threads.

Bank Indonesia controls the production cycle of the rupiah. It plans the amount and denominations required and is responsible for issuing, circulating, withdrawing and destroying the currency. Perum Peruri, the state-owned security printer authorised to produce rupiah, prints the banknotes and mints the coins. The banknotes use specialised inks, security threads and watermarks, while the coins are minted to specified dimensions and relief depths.

The 2022 banknotes use revised materials and security features intended to make them last longer, easier to recognise and harder to counterfeit. Features visible to the public include security threads, colour-changing ink, raised printing and watermarks. The Rp20,000, Rp50,000 and Rp100,000 notes have threads that appear woven through the paper, while the lower denominations have embedded threads. Certain printed areas are raised, including pairs of tactile lines intended for people with impaired vision; when held to the light, the notes display a hero watermark and an ornament.

Bank Indonesia advises the public to check banknotes using the "3D" method—dilihat, diraba, diterawang—meaning "look, feel, and hold to the light". A genuine note should have clear colours and the appropriate security thread; parts of its printing and tactile marks should feel raised; and its watermark and ornament should become visible when the note is held up to the light. A suspected counterfeit may be taken to a bank, the police or a Bank Indonesia office for examination.

== History ==
=== Introduction and consolidation ===
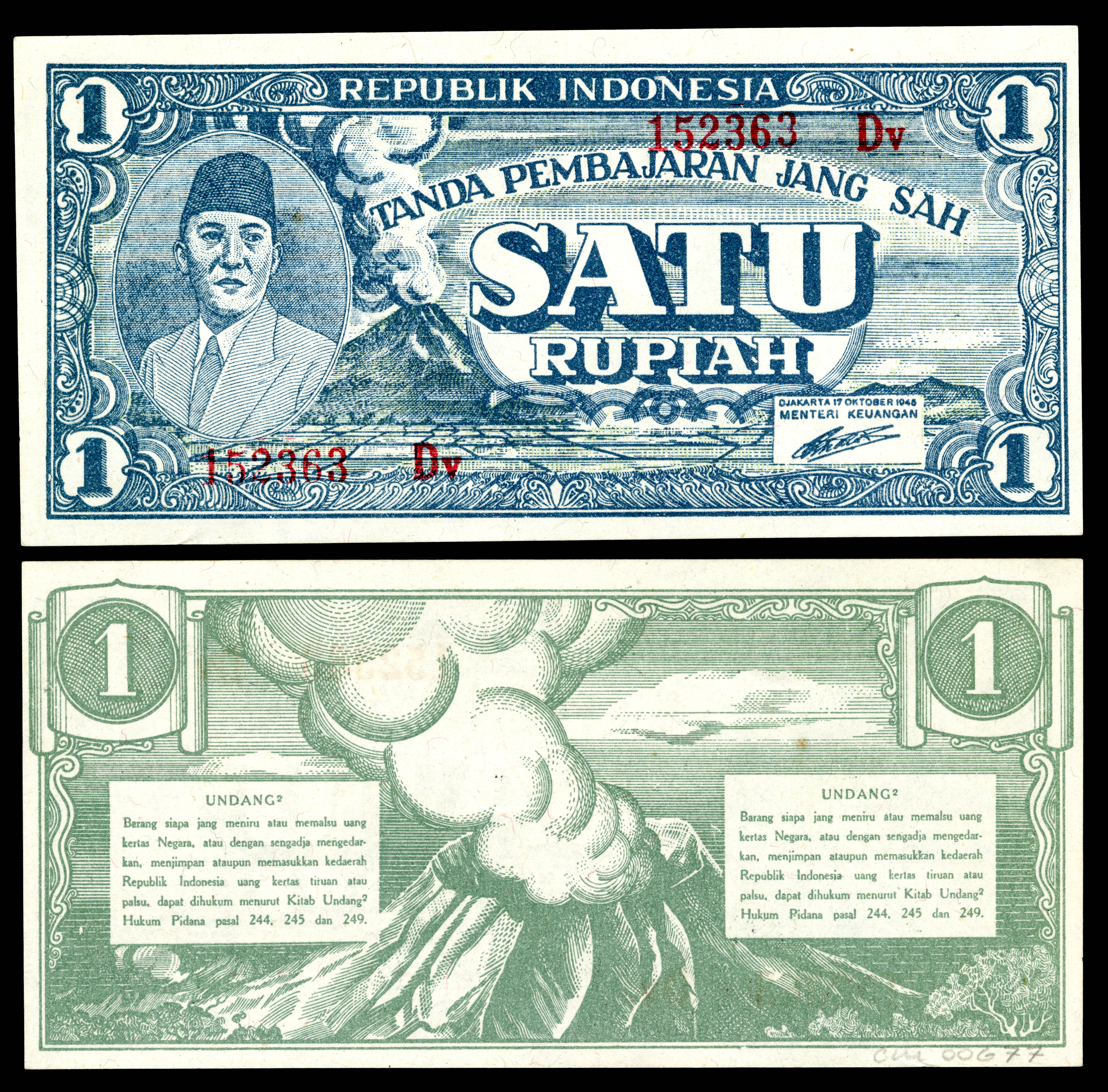
A one-rupiah banknote from the first issue in 1945, featuring a portrait of Sukarno on the obverse and a volcano on the reverse.

Before the Japanese occupation, the Bank of Java (De Javasche Bank) issued banknotes denominated in Netherlands Indies guilders. The Japanese military government later issued its own gulden- and rupiah-denominated notes. After Indonesia declared independence, Japanese currency and money issued by the Netherlands Indies Civil Administration (NICA) remained in circulation while the republican government prepared a national currency.

Oeang Republik Indonesia (ORI) entered circulation on 30 October 1946. ORI and regional currencies sought to replace Japanese money and rival NICA notes. In Bukittinggi, military leaders managed the printing of regional currency despite formal civilian and banking oversight. Poor controls in several areas put too much money into circulation that caused rapid inflation during the revolution.

Disrupted communication during the revolution led the government to authorise temporary regional issues, known as ORIDA, from 1947. In May 1950, the federal government withdrew ORI and ORIDA in favour of the currency of the United States of Indonesia; that currency ceased to be valid when Indonesia returned to a unitary state in August. In 1953, Bank Indonesia issued its first banknotes.

=== Redenomination and monetary unification ===
In October 1963, the government and Bank Indonesia introduced regional rupiahs in the Riau Islands and West Irian, replacing the Malayan dollar in Riau and the guilder then used in West Irian. The Riau rupiah was withdrawn on 1 July 1964 and replaced by the rupiah used elsewhere in Indonesia.

On 13 December 1965, the government redenominated the currency at a rate of one new rupiah to 1,000 old rupiah. The 1965 decree introduced a new rupiah and authorised Bank Indonesia to issue currency in all denominations. A 1968 law made the bank the sole issuer of banknotes and coins. In 1971, the national rupiah was introduced in West Irian and the regional West Irian rupiah began to be withdrawn, completing monetary unification.

=== Later developments ===
Bank Indonesia continued to introduce new denominations and revise the design and security features of rupiah banknotes. It issued the first Rp2,000 banknote in 2009, followed by a new series of banknotes and coins featuring national heroes in 2016. A commemorative Rp75,000 note was issued in 2020 for the 75th anniversary of Indonesian independence, and a revised seven-denomination banknote series entered circulation in 2022.

== Value and exchange-rate policy ==
Indonesia's exchange-rate policy moved from multiple rates and foreign-exchange controls to fixed and managed arrangements, before the rupiah was allowed to float in August 1997.

=== Exchange controls and inflation, 1949–65 ===
After the transfer of sovereignty in December 1949, the rupiah's official exchange rate was Rp3.80 per US dollar, but foreign exchange was distributed through controls and multiple effective rates. A certificate system introduced on 11 March 1950 required exporters to sell their foreign-currency earnings to the Foreign Exchange Fund. The certificates raised the effective return received by exporters to twice the official rate, while importers paid three times that rate. The system ended in 1953, but export premiums, duties and import licensing continued. In June 1957, the Export Evidence (Bukti Ekspor) system allowed certificates valued at the official rate of Rp11.40 per dollar to be traded by licensed users. Their market price rose to 332% of face value in March 1958 before the government fixed it.

By 1959, the official rate was far below the price of foreign currency outside the controlled system. The black-market price of one dollar rose from Rp100 to Rp150 between April and July, while the official rate remained Rp11.40. On 25 August, the government reduced the face value of Rp500 and Rp1,000 notes to one-tenth, froze 90% of bank deposits above Rp25,000 and devalued the official rate to Rp45 per dollar. The measures reduced the money supply temporarily, but deficit financing resumed and prices rose rapidly after 1960.

Multiple exchange rates persisted, while parallel-market premiums reached 2,678% in July 1962 and 11,100% in November 1965. On 13 December 1965, amid hyperinflation, the government replaced 1,000 old rupiah with one new rupiah; the change of unit did not immediately end the multiple-rate system.

=== Stabilisation and managed depreciation, 1966–97 ===
The stabilisation programme introduced after 1966 brought inflation down sharply, reaching single digits by 1970. On 23 August 1971, the government changed the exchange rate from Rp378 to Rp415 per US dollar and maintained the new rate for seven years. By 1978, the government regarded the rupiah as overvalued and considered the fixed rate damaging to non-oil exports and domestic production. It devalued the currency to Rp625 per dollar on 15 November. The dollar peg was replaced by a closely managed rate set with reference to a basket of currencies.

Falling oil revenue and pressure on the balance of payments led to another devaluation on 30 March 1983, from about Rp703 to Rp970 per dollar. Its main purpose was to increase the competitiveness of traded goods, restrain imports and promote non-oil exports. The collapse in oil prices prompted a further devaluation on 12 September 1986, from Rp1,134 to about Rp1,660 per dollar, as part of a wider effort to reduce dependence on oil earnings and strengthen non-oil exports.

After the 1986 devaluation, Bank Indonesia allowed the rupiah to depreciate gradually under a managed float rather than maintaining another fixed parity. The policy sought to preserve export competitiveness by broadly offsetting the difference between Indonesian inflation and that of its trading partners; during the first half of the 1990s, the rupiah depreciated against the dollar by about 5% a year. Bank Indonesia introduced an intervention band in January 1994, allowing the market rate to move around its announced middle rate while the central bank bought or sold dollars near the limits.

As financial deregulation made monetary aggregates less reliable, the band was widened to give the exchange rate more short-term flexibility and reduce the burden on monetary policy. It expanded from 1% in January 1994 to 12% in July 1997, shortly before the Asian financial crisis forced Indonesia to abandon the band.

=== Asian financial crisis, 1997–99 ===
Pressure on the rupiah increased after the financial crisis in Thailand spread to other Asian economies. Bank Indonesia widened its intervention band from 8 to 12% on 11 July 1997, but declining foreign-exchange reserves led it to abandon the band and allow the rupiah to float on 14 August. Banking weakness, large short-term foreign-currency debts and capital flight then deepened the fall. The IMF-supported programme agreed in late 1997 and revised during 1998 combined monetary restraint and external financing with bank and corporate restructuring, foreign-debt arrangements and increased social spending. In January 1998, the government introduced a broad guarantee for eligible liabilities of participating commercial banks and placed the restructuring programme under the Indonesian Bank Restructuring Agency. The rupiah reached about Rp16,800 per dollar on 17 June 1998 and recovered to below Rp9,000 by 19 October. The October programme memorandum also recorded tighter monetary control and additional official financing.

Bank resolution accelerated in 1999. On 13 March, the government closed 38 private banks, transferred seven to IBRA and initially approved nine for recapitalisation; deposits at the closed banks were transferred to designated institutions under the guarantee programme. By July, eight eligible private banks had been recapitalised, while four state banks were legally combined into Bank Mandiri and recapitalised in stages with government bonds. The programme kept the exchange rate market-determined while Bank Indonesia controlled base-money growth, on the premise that renewed confidence in the currency and banking system was necessary for monetary stabilisation.

Although the rupiah remained volatile early in the year, it strengthened to about Rp7,100 per dollar by the end of 1999, compared with its June 1998 low. Inflation fell from 77.6% in 1998 to 2.01% in 1999, and legislation enacted that year confirmed the floating exchange-rate system. By the end of that year, most of the measures needed to protect the banking system and restore financial intermediation were in place. Restructuring remained incomplete, however, and resolving the banking crisis had been costly.

=== Post-crisis developments, 1999–present ===
After 1999, Indonesia retained a floating exchange-rate system. Bank Indonesia did not defend a fixed rate, but intervened to limit excessive volatility and the effect of depreciation on inflation. Bank Indonesia adopted an inflation-targeting framework in July 2005. Within that framework, it used the policy rate alongside foreign-exchange intervention, reserve management and capital-flow measures. The rupiah fell sharply during the 2008 global financial crisis, but strengthened with relatively low volatility in 2010.

The rupiah weakened again in 2013 as markets expected the United States Federal Reserve to reduce monetary stimulus and became concerned about Indonesia's current-account deficit. It briefly reached Rp15,000 per dollar in 2018. During the COVID-19 market disruption, the rupiah fell to Rp16,550 on 2 April 2020. Bank Indonesia increased intervention in the spot and domestic non-deliverable forward markets and bought government securities in the secondary market; by mid-December, the currency's depreciation from the end of 2019 had narrowed to 1.72%.

Exchange-rate volatility remained comparatively low in 2021, but pressure returned during 2023 and 2024 as uncertainty over United States monetary policy and conflict in the Middle East affected capital flows. Bank Indonesia responded with interest-rate increases and intervention in spot and derivative markets. On 16 April 2024, the rupiah fell as far as Rp16,200 per dollar, its weakest level since early April 2020.

In 2026, the rupiah reached successive record lows, passing Rp17,000 in April and Rp18,000 in June. Foreign-exchange reserves fell by about US$12 billion between the start of 2026 and early June. Bank Indonesia raised its policy rate by 50 basis points in May, by 25 basis points at an unscheduled meeting on 9 June, and by another 25 basis points on 18 June, bringing it to 5.75%. It also increased intervention in offshore non-deliverable forwards and the domestic spot and derivative markets, maintained higher yields on Bank Indonesia securities and reduced hedging costs for foreign investors.

== Proposed redenomination ==
Proposals to redenominate the rupiah would remove three zeroes from its denominations without reducing its purchasing power. The plan was raised by the government in 2013, but parliamentary consideration was postponed the following year because of unfavourable economic conditions. A redenomination bill was later submitted to the House of Representatives, but was not included in its 2015–2019 legislative programme. In 2017, Bank Indonesia governor Agus Martowardojo called for the bill to be considered, saying that implementation could take up to eight years.

A government-sponsored bill based on Bank Indonesia's recommendation was included in the 2025–2029 National Medium-Term Legislative Programme. The Ministry of Finance's strategic plan for the same period expected the bill to be finalised by 2027. Bank Indonesia said redenomination would simplify transactions, strengthen the rupiah's credibility and support the payment system, but that implementation would depend on political, economic and social stability and on legal, logistical and technical preparations. Economist Syafruddin Karimi questioned whether changing nominal values would produce wider economic benefits and warned that the simultaneous circulation of old and new currency could cause confusion and fraud.

== Digital rupiah ==
Bank Indonesia launched Project Garuda on 30 November 2022 by publishing a white paper on the design of a central bank digital currency called the digital rupiah. The project provides for wholesale and retail forms. The wholesale form would be available to a limited group for transactions such as monetary operations and settlement in the foreign-exchange and money markets, while the retail form would be available to the public for payments and transfers. Unlike commercial bank deposits and electronic money, the digital rupiah would be a direct liability of Bank Indonesia. Bank Indonesia says it would circulate alongside banknotes and coins.

Bank Indonesia published a consultation paper on the first wholesale stage in January 2023 and completed its initial proof of concept in 2024. The test covered issuance, destruction and transfers using two distributed-ledger platforms. The proof-of-concept platform was not open to the public, and Bank Indonesia said that the technologies tested did not represent a commitment to use them in any later implementation.

== See also ==
- Economy of Indonesia
- Netherlands Indies gulden
- Netherlands New Guinean gulden
- Riau rupiah
- West Irian rupiah

== Notes ==
Preceded by: No modern predecessor	Currency of Indonesia; 1945 –	Succeeded by: Current
