= Zanzibari ryal =

Currency of Zanzibar from 1882-1908

The ryal (Arabic: ريال) was the currency of Zanzibar between 1882 and 1908. It was subdivided into 136 pysa and circulated alongside the Indian rupee and Maria Theresa thaler. The ryal was replaced by the Zanzibari rupee at 2 1/8 rupees = 1 ryal.

== Coins ==
In 1882 (A.H. 1299), coins were introduced in denominations of 1 pysa, 1/4, 1/2, 1, 2 1/2 and 5 ryals. The pysa was struck in copper, with the 1/4, 1/2 and 1 ryal in silver and the 2 1/2 and 5 ryals struck in gold. Further 1 pysa coins were struck in 1887 (A.H. 1304) but no more silver or gold pieces were ever struck.

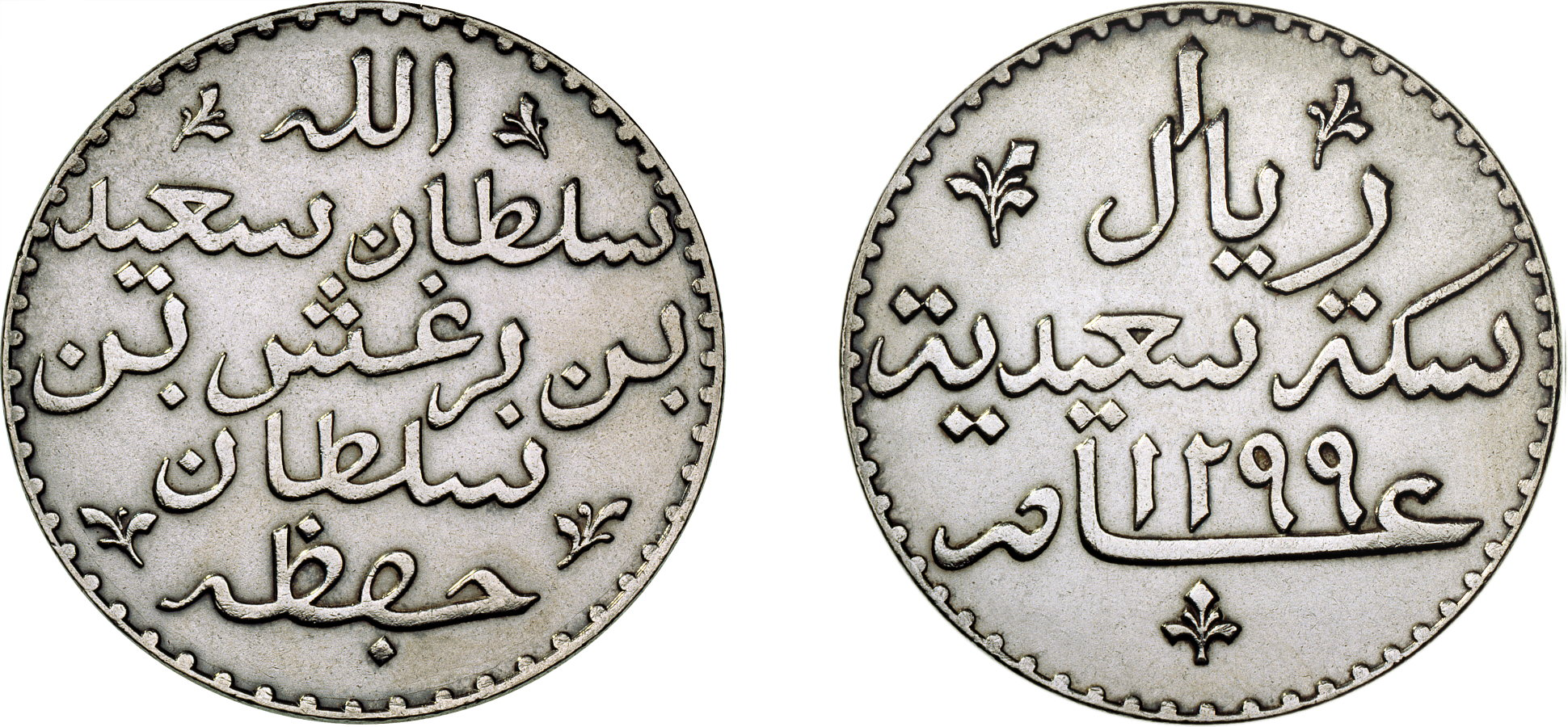
Zanzibar 1 ryal AH1299 (AD1882)

The silver and gold ryals all look similar with the exception of the denomination and were struck at the Royal Belgian Mint, Brussels, Belgium. Only the 1 and 5 ryal were put in circulation; for the 1/4, 1/2, and 2 1/2 ryal only patterns were struck. The 1 ryal coin of 38 mm in diameter shows the following text. Obverse: line 1 and 5: الله حفظه (Allah guards); line 2 tot 4: سلطان سعيد بن برغش بن سلطان (sultan Sa’id bin Barghash bin Sultan). Reverse: ١ ريال سكة سعيدية ١٢٩٩عام (ryal 1, coin of Sa’idiat, year 1299). Zanzibar has been called the Isle of Cloves and the clove sprigs can be seen at different positions on the obverse and reverse.

Preceded by: No modern predecessor	Currency of Zanzibar; 1882 – 1908; Concurrent with: Indian rupee and Maria Theresa thaler	Succeeded by: Zanzibari rupee Ratio: 2 1/8 rupees = 1 riyal
