= Banknotes of the East African shilling =

The following banknotes were issued for the East African shilling.

== 1921 issue ==
1921 issue
Image		Value	Catalog number	Colour	Description		Date of printing	Remarks
Front	Back	Value	Catalog number	Colour	Front	Back	Date of printing	Remarks
		5 shillings	P13	Blue-black on brown and orange underprinting	Portrait of George V at upper or lower right	Lion in front of mountain	December 15, 1921	Value in shillings written in English, Arabic, and Gujarati, value in pounds written in English only
		10 shillings	P14	Blue-black on green and pink underprinting	Portrait of George V at upper or lower right	Lion in front of mountain	December 15, 1921	Value in shillings written in English, Arabic, and Gujarati, value in pounds written in English only
		20 shillings 1 pound	P15	Blue-black on yellow and orange underprinting	Portrait of George V at upper or lower right	Lion in front of mountain	December 15, 1921	Value in shillings written in English, Arabic, and Gujarati, value in pounds written in English only
		100 shillings 5 pounds	P16	Blue-black on lilac underprinting	Portrait of George V at upper or lower right	Lion in front of mountain	December 15, 1921	Value in shillings written in English, Arabic, and Gujarati, value in pounds written in English only
		200 shillings 10 pounds	P17	Blue-black on gray-blue underprinting	Portrait of George V at upper or lower right	Lion in front of mountain	December 15, 1921	Value in shillings written in English, Arabic, and Gujarati, value in pounds written in English only
		1000 shillings 50 pounds	P18	Blue-black on light brown underprinting	Portrait of George V at upper or lower right	Lion in front of mountain	December 15, 1921	Value in shillings written in English, Arabic, and Gujarati, value in pounds written in English only
		10,000 shillings 500 pounds	P19	Blue-black on blue underprinting	Portrait of George V at upper or lower right	Lion in front of mountain	December 15, 1921	Value in shillings written in English, Arabic, and Gujarati, value in pounds written in English only
For table standards, see the banknote specification table.

== 1933 issue ==
1933 issue
Image		Value	Catalog number	Colour	Description		Date of printing	Remarks
Front	Back	Value	Catalog number	Colour	Front	Back	Date of printing	Remarks
		5 shillings	P20	Blue-black on brown and orange underprinting, back orange-brown	Portrait of George V at upper or lower right	Lion in front of mountain	January 1, 1933	Value in shillings written in English, Arabic, and Gujarati, value in pounds written in English only
		10 shillings	P21	Blue-black on green and pink underprinting, back green	Portrait of George V at upper or lower right	Lion in front of mountain	January 1, 1933	Value in shillings written in English, Arabic, and Gujarati, value in pounds written in English only
		20 shillings 1 pound	P22	Blue-black on yellow and orange underprinting, back brown	Portrait of George V at upper or lower right	Lion in front of mountain	January 1, 1933	Value in shillings written in English, Arabic, and Gujarati, value in pounds written in English only
		100 shillings 5 pounds	P23	Blue-black on lilac underprinting, back red-brown	Portrait of George V at upper or lower right	Lion in front of mountain	January 1, 1933	Value in shillings written in English, Arabic, and Gujarati, value in pounds written in English only
		200 shillings 10 pounds	P24	Blue-black on gray-blue underprinting	Portrait of George V at upper or lower right		January 1, 1933	Value in shillings written in English, Arabic, and Gujarati, value in pounds written in English only
		1000 shillings 50 pounds	P25	Blue-black on light brown underprinting	Portrait of George V at upper or lower right		January 1, 1933	Value in shillings written in English, Arabic, and Gujarati, value in pounds written in English only
		10,000 shillings 500 pounds	P26	Blue-black on blue underprinting	Portrait of George V at upper or lower right		January 1, 1933	Value in shillings written in English, Arabic, and Gujarati, value in pounds written in English only
For table standards, see the banknote specification table.

== 1938–52 issue ==
1938-52 issue
Image		Value	Catalog number	Colour	Description		Date of printing	Remarks
Front	Back	Value	Catalog number	Colour	Front	Back	Date of printing	Remarks
		1 shilling	P27	Blue-black on purple underprinting, back purple	Portrait of George VI at upper or lower left	Lion in front of mountain	January 1, 1943	Value written in English, Arabic, and Gujarati
		5 shillings	P28	Blue-black on brown underprinting	Portrait of George VI at upper or lower left	Lion in front of mountain	1938-1952	Value written in English, Arabic, and Gujarati
		5 shillings	P28A	Blue-black on brown underprinting	Portrait of George VI at upper or lower left	Lion in front of mountain	January 8, 1942	Like P28 but with India style serial number. Without imprint. Value written in English, Arabic, and Gujarati
		10 shillings	P29	Dark blue on green and pink underprinting	Portrait of George VI at upper or lower left	Lion in front of mountain	1938-1952	Value written in English, Arabic, and Gujarati
		10 shillings	P29A	Dark blue on green and pink underprinting	Portrait of George VI at upper or lower left	Lion in front of mountain	January 8, 1942	Like P29 but with India style serial number, and without imprint. Value written in English, Arabic, and Gujarati
		20 shillings 1 pound	P30	Blue-black on yellow and orange underprinting	Portrait of George VI at upper or lower left	Lion in front of mountain	1938-1952	Value in shillings written in English, Arabic, and Gujarati. Value in pounds written in English only.
		20 shillings 1 pound	P30A	Blue-black on yellow and orange underprinting	Portrait of George VI at upper or lower left	Lion in front of mountain	January 8, 1942	Like P30 but with India style serial number, and without imprint. Value in shillings written in English, Arabic, and Gujarati. Value in pounds written in English only.
		100 shillings 5 pounds	P31	Blue-black on green and lilac underprinting	Portrait of George VI at upper or lower left	Lion in front of mountain	1938-1951	Value in shillings written in English, Arabic, and Gujarati. Value in pounds written in English only.
		10,000 shillings 500 pounds	P32	Blue-black on blue underprinting	Portrait of George VI at upper or lower left	Lion in front of mountain	January 1, 1947-January 8, 1951	Value in shillings written in English, Arabic, and Gujarati. Value in pounds written in English only.
For table standards, see the banknote specification table.

== 1953 issue ==
1953 issue
Image		Value	Catalog number	Colour	Description		Date of printing	Remarks
Front	Back	Value	Catalog number	Colour	Front	Back	Date of printing	Remarks
		5 shillings	P33	Blue-black on light brown underprinting	Portrait of Elizabeth II on upper or lower right		March 31, 1953 – October 1, 1957	Value in shillings written in English, Arabic, and Gujarati. Value in pounds written in English only.
		10 shillings	P34	Blue-black on green and pink underprinting	Portrait of Elizabeth II on upper or lower right		March 31, 1953 – October 1, 1957	Value in shillings written in English, Arabic, and Gujarati. Value in pounds written in English only.
		20 shillings 1 pound	P35	Blue-black on yellow and orange underprinting	Portrait of Elizabeth II on upper or lower right		March 31, 1953 – February 1, 1956	Value in shillings written in English, Arabic, and Gujarati. Value in pounds written in English only.
		100 shillings 5 pounds	P36	Blue-black on green and lilac underprinting	Portrait of Elizabeth II on upper or lower right		March 31, 1953 – February 1, 1956	Value in shillings written in English, Arabic, and Gujarati. Value in pounds written in English only.
For table standards, see the banknote specification table.

== 1958–60 issue ==
1958-60 issue
Image		Value	Catalog number	Colour	Description		Date of printing	Remarks
Front	Back	Value	Catalog number	Colour	Front	Back	Date of printing	Remarks
		5 shillings	P37	Brown on multicolor underprinting	Portrait of Elizabeth II on upper or lower right		1958-60	Value written in English, Arabic, and Gujarati.
		10 shillings	P38	Green on multicolor underprinting	Portrait of Elizabeth II on upper or lower right		1958-60	Value written in English, Arabic, and Gujarati.
		20 shillings	P39	Blue on multicolor underprinting	Portrait of Elizabeth II on upper or lower right		1958-60	Value written in English, Arabic, and Gujarati.
		100 shillings	P40	Red on multicolor underprinting	Portrait of Elizabeth II on upper or lower right		1958-60	Value written in English, Arabic, and Gujarati.
For table standards, see the banknote specification table.

Pick, Albert (1996). Bruce, Colin R. II; Shafer, Neil (eds.). Standard Catalog of World Paper Money: General Issues to 1960 (8th ed.). Krause Publications. ISBN 0-87341-469-1.
