= German East African rupie =

1890–1916 currency of German East Africa

Deutsch-Ostafrikanische Rupie (German)
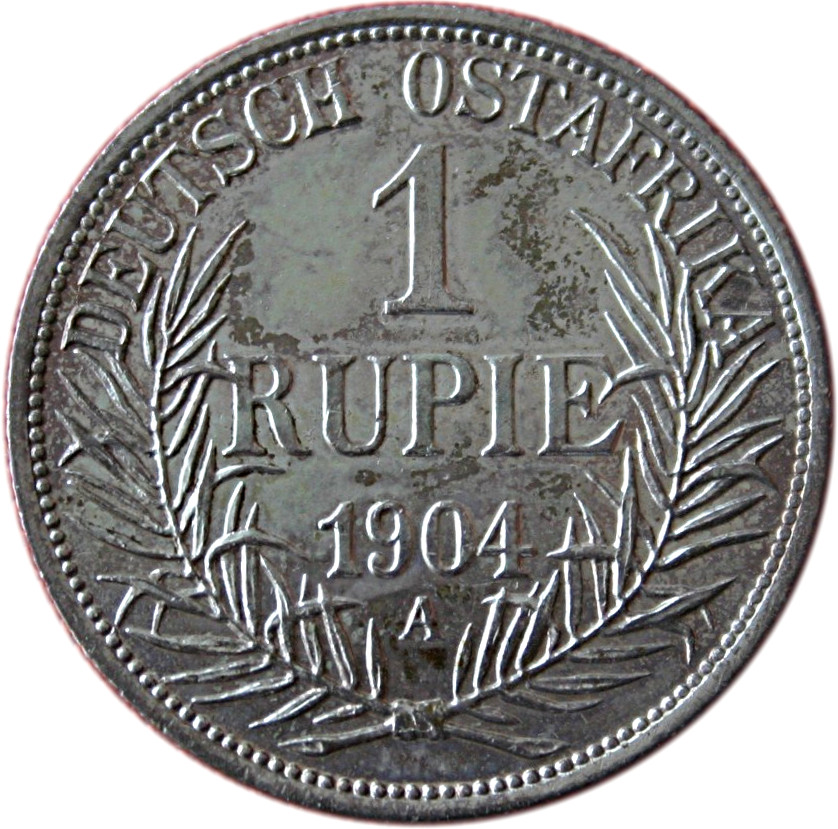
- 1 Rupie coin

Units of account
- Plural: Rupien
- Subunit
- 1/64: Pesa (before 1904)
- 1/100: Heller

Denominations
- Banknotes: 1, 5, 10, 20, 50, 100, 200, 500 Rupien
- Coins: 1/2, 1, 5, 10, 20 Heller, 1/4, 1/2, 1, 2, 15 Rupien

Demographics
- User(s): German East Africa

Issuance
- Central bank: Deutsch-Ostafrikanische Bank
- This infobox shows the latest status before this currency was rendered obsolete.

The Rupie was the currency of German East Africa between 1890 and 1916, continuing to circulate in the Tanganyika Territory until 1920.

== History ==
The Indian rupee was the dominant currency used along the East African coast during the second half of the 19th century where it had marginalized the American gold dollar and the Maria Theresa thaler. The German East Africa Company acquired rights to mint coinage in 1890 and issued rupies which were equivalent to the Indian and Zanzibar rupee. The Company retained its coinage rights even after the takeover of German East Africa by the government later in 1890. In 1904 the German government took over currency matters and established the Ostafrikanische Bank.

The Rupie was initially equivalent to the Indian rupee. Until 1904, it was subdivided into 64 Pesa (equivalent to the Indian pice or paisa). The currency was decimalized on 28 February 1904, with 1 Rupie = 100 Heller, which was then adapted into the Swahili language as the word 'hela' which is still in use today meaning 'money'. At the same time, a fixed exchange rate of 15 Rupien = 20 German Mark was established.

The colonial government of German East Africa minted 15-rupee gold coins in 1916 to address the wartime shortage of coinage caused by the Allied blockade.

In 1915 and 1916 in the period of fighting in East Africa during World War I a large series of emergency issues of paper money were issued. 1916 also saw a final issue of coins to pay German led troops, including 15 Rupien coins which contained an equivalent amount of gold from the Sekenke Gold Mine to equal 15 German Marks. Later in 1916 German East Africa was occupied by British and Belgian forces. In Tanganyika, the Rupie circulated alongside the East African rupee (to which it was equal) until 1920, when both were replaced by the East African florin at par. In Burundi and Rwanda, the Belgian Congo franc replaced the Rupie in 1916.

== Coins ==
In 1890, copper 1 Pesa and silver 1 and 2 Rupie coins were introduced, followed the next year by silver 1/4 and 1/2 Rupie and in 1893 by silver 2 Rupien coins. The silver coins were minted to the same standard as the Indian rupee.

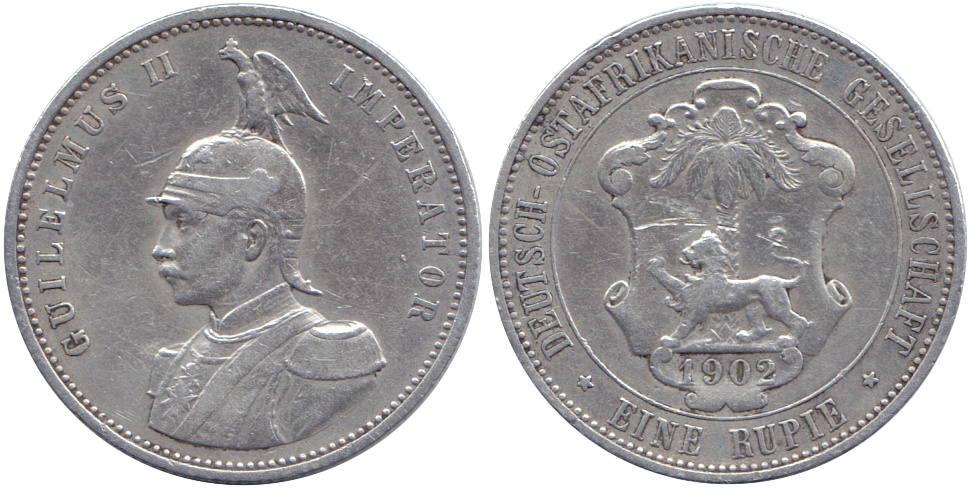
1 rupee, 1902

As a consequence of decimalization, bronze 1/2 and 1 Heller were introduced in 1904, followed by bronze 5 Heller and holed, cupro-nickel 10 Heller in 1908. In 1913, holed, cupro-nickel 5 Heller were introduced.

The 1916 issues were minted at Tabora as a wartime emergency coinage. A total of 302,940 brass 5 Heller were issued. In addition, both copper (325,000) and brass (1,307,760) 20 Heller coins were produced, a quantity that allows them to remain readily available for collectors. In addition 16,198 of the gold 15 Rupien mentioned above were produced. While the smaller valued coins were crudely struck, the gold pieces received fine detail.

== Banknotes ==
In 1905, the Deutsch-Ostafrikanische Bank introduced notes for 5, 10, 50, and 100 Rupien, and 500 Rupien in 1912. Between 1915 and 1917, World War I emergency issue (interim) notes were produced in denominations of 1, 5, 10, 20, 50 and 200 Rupien.

=== Emergency issue (provisional banknotes) ===
Colonial German East Africa was cut off from Germany resulting from a wartime blockade. Silver coinage was hoarded for its intrinsic value in commercial transactions, and the colonial government was pressured into creating interim banknotes. Previous issues of banknotes (i.e., 1905 and 1912) were produced by the German printing company Giesecke & Devrient. The colonial government contracted with the printers of Deutsch-Ostafrikanische Zeitung, a daily newspaper in Dar es Salaam, and on 15 March 1915 they produced the first issue of provisional notes (20 rupien), initially printed on linen and later on paper made from jute. Given the wartime supply shortages, the provisional notes were also printed on commercial paper, wrapping paper, and in one very rare instance, wall paper. Initially variations of white, the notes also appeared in a wide variety of colors, including blue-gray, olive brown, reddish brown, golden brown, dark brown, gray brown, shades of blue, and dark green.

The translated text of the notes states: (front) Provisional Banknote. The German East African Bank will pay, without checking a person’s identity, one rupie (etc.) from its offices in the D.O.A. protectorate. and, in both German and Swahili: (reverse) One hundred percent of the face value of this banknote is deposited with the Imperial German East African government. A warning on the lower reverse of the note states that counterfeiting will result in a minimum sentence of two years at hard labor. Treasury records from colonial German East Africa indicate that 8,876,741 interim notes were printed.

Complete denomination set of World War I German East African Rupie (1915-17 emergency issue series)
Value	Year	Image	Size
1 Rupie	1915		105 mm × 63 mm (4.1 in × 2.5 in)
5 Rupien	1915		118 mm × 72 mm (4.6 in × 2.8 in)
10 Rupien	1916		130 mm × 88 mm (5.1 in × 3.5 in)
20 Rupien	1915		156 mm × 99 mm (6.1 in × 3.9 in)
50 Rupien	1915		150 mm × 98 mm (5.9 in × 3.9 in)
200 Rupien	1915		

== Notes ==
Preceded by: Indian rupee Ratio: at par	Currency of German East Africa (Tanganyika, Burundi, Rwanda); 1890 – 1916 in Burundi and Rwanda, 1920 in Tanganyika; Note: German East Africa was occupied by British and Belgian forces in 1916	Succeeded by: East African florin Location: Tanganyika; Reason: given to United Kingdom by Treaty of Versailles; Ratio: at par
Preceded by: Indian rupee Ratio: at par	Currency of German East Africa (Tanganyika, Burundi, Rwanda); 1890 – 1916 in Burundi and Rwanda, 1920 in Tanganyika; Note: German East Africa was occupied by British and Belgian forces in 1916	Succeeded by: Belgian Congolese franc Location: Burundi, Rwanda; Reason: given to Belgium by Treaty of Versailles
