= Pysa =

The Pysa was a Zanzibari coin that was struck in AH1299 (1882) and AH1304 (1887). The obverses of these coins have a pair of scales. The name 'Pysa' is derived from the currency units 'Pice' and 'Paisa'. The AH1299 1 Pysa often turns up in old coin collections, but the AH1304 coin very seldom turns up. The AH1299 coin was struck at the Royal Belgian Mint, Brussels, Belgium while the AH1304 coin was struck at Heaton's Mint, Birmingham, England.

These coins were commissioned by Sultan Barghash bin Said ibn Sultan who was, apparently and understandably, upset that his name was written incorrectly on the coins as "Sultan Said ibn Barghash ibn Sultan". It is accompanied by the expression "حفظه الله" (lit. 'may Allah save him'. Note that even one of the Arabic characters was incorrectly written: the "fa" in "حفظه" is written with a dot below (a Maghreb variant) rather than with the dot above as in standard Arabic script.

== See also ==
- Zanzibari ryal
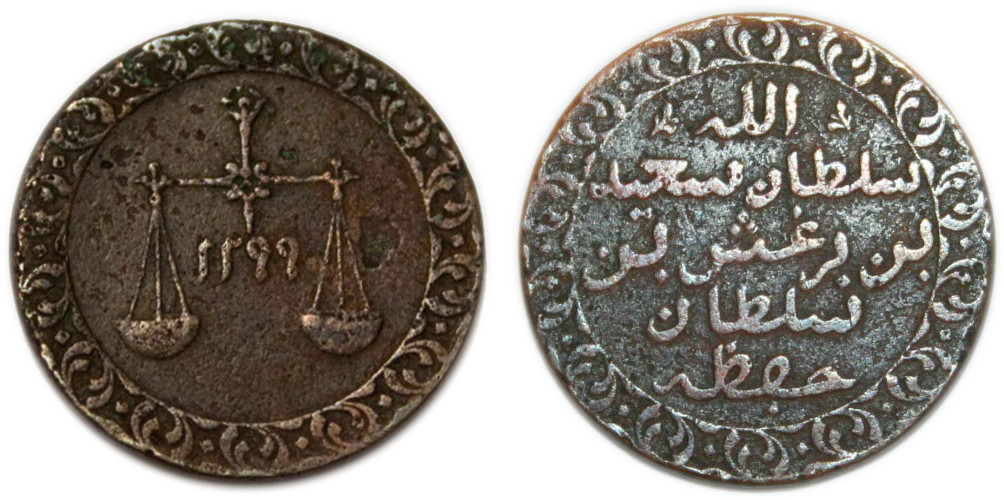
One Zanzibar Pysa coin minted 1299 AH (1882 AD)
