= West Irian rupiah =

The West Irian rupiah was a distinct currency of West Irian (formerly West New Guinea) between 1963 and 1973. It replaced the West New Guinea gulden at par and was replaced by the Indonesian rupiah at the rate of 1 West Irian rupiah = 18.9 Indonesian rupiah.

== History ==
The presence of the Dutch in Netherlands New Guinea had been a subject of disagreement ever since the treaty that negotiated the Dutch withdrawal from Indonesia in 1949. The Dutch were unwilling to cede to Indonesian control, preferring instead to establish a state of Papua. The Indonesians eventually broke off diplomatic relations with the Dutch, on 17 August 1960. Due to the Indonesians insurgency and confusion over the status of the province, the UN took control as West New Guinea under the authority of the United Nations Temporary Executive Authority on 1 October 1962. On 1 May 1963, UNTEA agreed that the province would be transferred to Indonesia, as Irian Barat (West Irian), a province of Indonesia.

By Presidential decree of Sukarno, on the day of 1 May 1963, the existing Netherlands New Guinean gulden was to be withdrawn, replaced at par, with government-issued coinage, government 1 and 2½ rupiah notes, with larger denomination notes to be issued by Bank Indonesia (the same division between government (aka treasury notes) and bank notes as existed for the Indonesian rupiah). Since the West Irian rupiah was replacing the gulden, which was a much stronger currency than the Indonesian rupiah, the Indonesian currency was not valid tender in Irian, in order to preserve the value of the Irian currency.

Hyperinflation in Indonesia (which due to the separate monetary policy and currency, did not afflict Irian, although inflation was certainly still present) had necessitated a 1000 to 1 devaluation of the national currency in December 1965. It was the intention of the Presidential decree of 13 December 1965 that the 'rupiah baru' (new rupiah) become the unified national currency of all of Indonesia, exchangeable for the Irian Barat rupiah at par. However, a subsequent decree of 15 September 1966 restored the validity of the Irian money, recalling the Indonesian rupiah from Indonesia.

The Indonesian rupiah only finally became legal tender in Irian on 18 February 1971. The existing Irian Barat money was exchangeable from May 1971 at the rate of 1 Irian Barat rupiah to 18.9 Indonesian rupiah. Thus given the official exchange rate of 378 Indonesian rupiah to 1 US$ at the time, it can be seen that the Irian Barat rupiah was ultimately worth exactly US$0.05. The Netherlands New Guinea gulden, fixed at par to the Dutch guilder, was exchangeable at 3.62 to the US dollar at the time of original conversion in 1963. Relative to the dollar therefore the currency had lost 82% of its value in 8 years.

The Irian Barat rupiah circulated alongside the Indonesian rupiah as legal tender, for a further two years, until 1 April 1973.

== Coins ==
Coins were issued in denominations of 1, 5, 10, 25 and 50 sen. All were minted in aluminium and dated 1962. Unlike those issued for Riau (see Riau rupiah), they bore no edge inscription.

== Banknotes ==
Bank Indonesia notes were printed by Indonesian printer P.N. Pertjetakan Kebajoran (currently Perum Peruri) dated "1960" with the overprint "Irian Barat" in denominations of 5, 10, and 100 rupiah bearing the image of President Sukarno. The government notes were dated "1961" with the "Irian Barat" overprint in 1 and 2½ rupiah denominations.

Near-identical, but for the overprint, versions of all five notes had previously been issued for the Riau rupiah, while the same five notes (minus the overprint) were also circulated as Indonesian rupiah in 1965 (with the 1 and 2½ rupiah notes alone redated, to "1964").

Notes of the 'Irian Barat rupiah', 1960, Bank Indonesia, printed by PN Pertjetakan Kebajoran
Image		Value	Dimensions	Main Colour	Description						date of		
Obverse	Reverse	Value	Dimensions	Main Colour	Obverse	Reverse	Serial	Signature	Printer's mark	Watermark	Note	issue	withdrawal
		5 rupiah	134 × 67 mm	Grey	Sukarno with sugar cane, 'IRIAN BARAT' overprint	Female Balinese dancer	3 letters 6 numbers	Acting Governor: Soetikno Slamet; Director: Indra Kasoema	Pertjetakan Kebajoran	Sukarno	'1960'	1 May 1963	31 May 1971
		10 rupiah	140 × 70 mm	Pink	Sukarno with sugar cane, 'IRIAN BARAT' overprint	2 female Balinese dancers	3 letters 6 numbers	Acting Governor: Soetikno Slamet; Director: Indra Kasoema	Pertjetakan Kebajoran	Sukarno	'1960'	1 May 1963	31 May 1971
		100 rupiah	158 × 79 mm	Green	Sukarno with sugar cane, 'IRIAN BARAT' overprint	Batak male and female dancer	3 letters 6 numbers	Acting Governor: Soetikno Slamet; Director: Indra Kasoema	Pertjetakan Kebajoran	Sukarno	'1960'	1 May 1963	31 May 1971
These images are to scale at 0.7 pixel per millimetre (18 pixel per inch). For table standards, see the banknote specification table.

Notes of the 'Irian Barat rupiah', 1961, Republik Indonesia, printed by PN Pertjetakan Kebajoran
Image		Value	Dimensions	Main Colour	Description						date of		
Obverse	Reverse	Value	Dimensions	Main Colour	Obverse	Reverse	Serial	Signature	Printer's mark	Watermark	Note	issue	withdrawal
		1 rupiah	122 × 61 mm	Red	Sukarno with sugar cane, 'IRIAN BARAT' overprint	Balinese female dancer	3 letters 6 numbers	R. M. Notohamiprodjo	no mark	no watermark	'1961'	1 May 1963	31 May 1971
		2½ rupiah	128 × 64 mm	Purple	Sukarno with sugar cane, 'IRIAN BARAT' overprint	Balinese female dancer	3 letters 6 numbers	R. M. Notohamiprodjo	no mark	no watermark	'1961'	1 May 1963	31 May 1971
These images are to scale at 0.7 pixel per millimetre (18 pixel per inch). For table standards, see the banknote specification table.

Preceded by: West New Guinea gulden	Currency of West New Guinea; 1963 – 1973	Succeeded by: Indonesian rupiah
