= East African rupee =

Currency of British East Africa from 1906 until 1920

The East African rupee was the currency of Britain's East African colonies and protectorates between 1906 and 1920. It was divided into 100 cents.

The rupee replaced the Indian rupee, which had previously circulated. In 1920, the rupee was revalued against sterling to a peg of 1 rupee = 2 shillings (1 florin). In East Africa, this was followed in the same year by the replacement of the rupee with the East African florin at par and then in 1921 by the East African shilling at 2 shillings per florin or rupee.

The currency is noteworthy for including the world's first aluminium coin, the 1907 1 cent coin.

== Coins ==
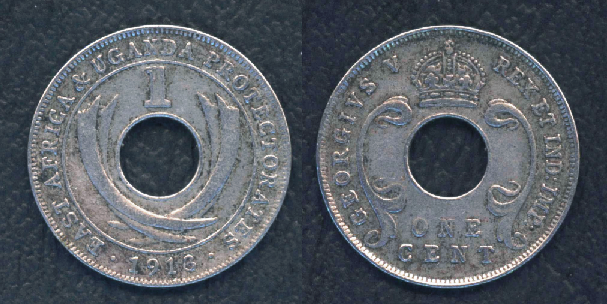
1 cent coin from 1913, cupro-nickel alloy

Silver coins were introduced for 25 and 50 cents in 1906, followed by the aluminium 1 cent and cupro-nickel 10 cent coins in 1907, the aluminium 1/2 cent coin in 1908 and the cupro-nickel 5 cent coin in 1913. Cupro-nickel replaced aluminium in 1909.

== Banknotes ==
In 1906, notes (the first dated 1905) were introduced by the Board of Commissioners of Currency, East Africa Protectorate in denominations of Rs. 5, Rs. 10, Rs. 20, Rs. 40, Rs. 100 and Rs. 500. In 1920, the East African Currency Board issued Re. 1 notes shortly before the rupee was replaced.

Preceded by: Indian rupee Ratio: at par	Currency of East Africa (Kenya, Uganda); 1906 – 1920	Succeeded by: East African florin Ratio: at par
Preceded by: German East African rupie Reason: Tanganyika given to United Kingdom by Treaty of Versailles; Ratio: at par	Currency of Tanganyika; 1919 – 1920	Succeeded by: East African florin Ratio: at par
