= French Indian rupee =

Currency of French India

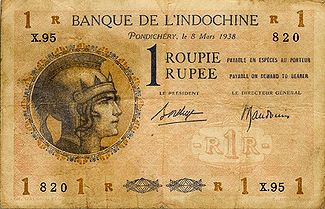
French 1 rupee, 1938

The roupie or rupee was the currency of French India. It was equal to the Indian rupee issued by the Indian government. One rupee was worth 2.40 francs-or. Until 1871 it was issued as coins with the roupie divided into 8 fanons, each of 3 doudous or 20 cash. From 1891, banknotes were issued by the Banque de l'Indochine, which circulated alongside coins issued by British India.

== Table of 1843 exchange rates ==
Pagodes	Roupies	Fanons (Panam)	Caches (Kāsu)	Francs-or
1	3.5	28	560	8.40
	1	8	160	2.40
		1	20	0.30
			1	0.015

== See also ==
- Puducherry
- French India
- Madras fanam
