= Riau rupiah =

Former currency of the Riau Archipelago

The Riau rupiah was a distinct currency of the Riau Archipelago between 1963 and 1964. It replaced the Malaya and British Borneo dollar at par and was replaced by the Indonesian rupiah at the rate of 1 Riau rupiah = 14.7 Indonesian rupiah.

== History ==
Riau, though part of Dutch and Indonesian territory, was economically under the influence of neighbouring Malaya. In order to affirm its fiscal stake in the region, a decree was passed on 15 October 1963 to replace the Malaya and British Borneo dollar (the circulating currency) with an Indonesian-issued currency, the Riau rupiah, which replaced the dollar at par. Although the Riau rupiah resembled the Indonesian rupiah in appearance, it had a much higher value. Malayan money was withdrawn from 1 November 1963. The Riau rupiah was exchangeable as a foreign currency with the Indonesian rupiah.

The Riau rupiah was much shorter lived than the West Irian rupiah (which circulated from May 1963 until 1971), and, by Presidential decree effective from 1 July 1964, the Riau rupiah was no longer a valid currency, being replaced by the Indonesian rupiah at a rate of 1 Riau rupiah = 14.7 Indonesian rupiah.

== Coins ==
Coins were issued in denominations of 1, 5, 10, 25 and 50 sen. All were minted in aluminium and dated 1962. They bore the identifying inscription "Kepulauan Riau" on their edge (cf. West Irian rupiah#Coins).

== Banknotes ==
Bank Indonesia notes were printed by Indonesian printer Pertjetakan Kebajoran dated "1960" with the overprint 'Riau' in denominations of 5, 10 and 100 rupiah, all carrying the image of President Sukarno but with colour and other design differences. Lower denomination notes, under Indonesian (and previously Netherlands Indies) law were the issuing privilege of the Indonesian government, and for Riau bore the date "1961" with the overprint "Riau", in 1 and 2 ½ rupiah denominations.

Identical notes, but for the overprint, were used for the West Irian rupiah in 1964. The five notes issued in Riau, the 5, 10, and 100 rupiah notes, minus the "Riau" overprint, plus the 1 and 2½ rupiah note designs, redated "1964", were then also used as Indonesian rupiah notes in 1965.

Green (1) and blue (2½) variants of the 1 and 2½ notes had also incidentally been printed, intended for issue in North Borneo, which Indonesia saw as a possible extension to its territory due to the power vacuum in the region at that time.

Notes of the 'Riau rupiah', 1960, Bank Indonesia, printed by Pertjetakan Kebajoran
Image		Value	Dimensions	Main Colour	Description						date of		
Obverse	Reverse	Value	Dimensions	Main Colour	Obverse	Reverse	Serial	Signature	Printer's mark	Watermark	Note	issue	withdrawal
		5 rupiah	134 × 67 mm	Violet	Sukarno with sugar cane, 'RIAU' overprint	Female Balinese dancer	3 letters 6 numbers	Acting Governor: Soetikno Slamet; Director: Indra Kasoema	Pertjetakan Kebajoran	Sukarno	'1960'	15 October 1963	30 June 1964
		10 rupiah	140 × 70 mm	Pink	Sukarno with sugar cane, 'RIAU' overprint	2 female Balinese dancers	3 letters 6 numbers	Acting Governor: Soetikno Slamet; Director: Indra Kasoema	Pertjetakan Kebajoran	Sukarno	'1960'	15 October 1963	30 June 1964
		100 rupiah	158 × 79 mm	Green	Sukarno with sugar cane, 'RIAU' overprint	Batak male and female dancer	3 letters 6 numbers	Acting Governor: Soetikno Slamet; Director: Indra Kasoema	Pertjetakan Kebajoran	Sukarno	'1960'	15 October 1963	30 June 1964
These images are to scale at 0.7 pixel per millimetre. For table standards, see the banknote specification table.

Notes of the 'Riau rupiah', 1961, Republik Indonesia, printed by Pertjetakan Kebajoran
Image		Value	Dimensions	Main Colour	Description						date of		
Obverse	Reverse	Value	Dimensions	Main Colour	Obverse	Reverse	Serial	Signature	Printer's mark	Watermark	Note	issue	withdrawal
		1 rupiah	122 × 61 mm	Red	Sukarno with sugar cane, 'RIAU' overprint	Balinese female dancer	3 letters 6 numbers	R. M. Notohamiprodjo	no mark	no watermark	'1961'	15 October 1963	30 June 1964
		2½ rupiah	128 × 64 mm	Blue	Sukarno with sugar cane, 'RIAU' overprint	Balinese female dancer	3 letters 6 numbers	R. M. Notohamiprodjo	no mark	no watermark	'1961'	15 October 1963	30 June 1964
These images are to scale at 0.7 pixel per millimetre. For table standards, see the banknote specification table.

Notes of the 'Borneo rupiah', 1961, Republik Indonesia, printed by Pertjetakan Kebajoran
Image		Value	Dimensions	Main Colour	Description						date of		
Obverse	Reverse	Value	Dimensions	Main Colour	Obverse	Reverse	Serial	Signature	Printer's mark	Watermark	Note	issue	withdrawal
		1 rupiah	122 × 61 mm	Green	Sukarno with sugar cane	Balinese female dancer	3 letters 6 numbers	R. M. Notohamiprodjo	no mark	no watermark	'1961'		
		2½ rupiah	128 × 64 mm	Blue	Sukarno with sugar cane	Balinese female dancer	3 letters 6 numbers	R. M. Notohamiprodjo	no mark	no watermark	'1961'		
These images are to scale at 0.7 pixel per millimetre. For table standards, see the banknote specification table.

Preceded by: Malaya and British Borneo dollar	Currency of Riau Archipelago; 1963 – 1964	Succeeded by: Indonesian rupiah
