= East African shilling =

Currency of British East Africa from 1921 until 1969

Shilingi ya Afrika Mashariki (Swahili); Scellino dell'Africa orientale (Italian); Shilinka Bariga Afrika (Somali); شلنق شرق أفريقي (Arabic); પૂર્વ આફ્રિકન શિલિંગ (Gujarati)

Units of account
- Symbol: Sh or /-
- Superunit
- 20: pound (£)
- Subunit
- 1/100: cent

Denominations
- Banknotes: 5/-, 10/-, 20/-, 100/-, 200/-, 1000/-, 10,000/-
- Coins: 1 ct, 5 cts, 10 cts, 50 cts, 1/-

Demographics
- User(s): Kenya Colony (1921–1969); Tanganyika (1921–1964); Uganda (1962–1963) (1921–1966); Zanzibar (1936–1964); British Somaliland (1941–1962); Eritrea (1941–1952); Ethiopia (1941–1945); Italian Somaliland (1941–1950); Aden Protectorate (1951–1963); Colony of Aden (1951–1963); Federation of Arab Emirates of the South (1959–1963); Federation of South Arabia (1963–1965); Protectorate of South Arabia (1963–1965); Tanzania (1964–1969)

Issuance
- Central bank: East African Currency Board
- This infobox shows the latest status before this currency was rendered obsolete.

The East African shilling was the sterling unit of account in British-controlled areas of East Africa from 1921 until 1969. It was issued by the East African Currency Board. It is also the proposed name for a common currency that the East African Community plans to introduce.

The shilling was divided into 100 cents, and twenty shillings were 1 pound.

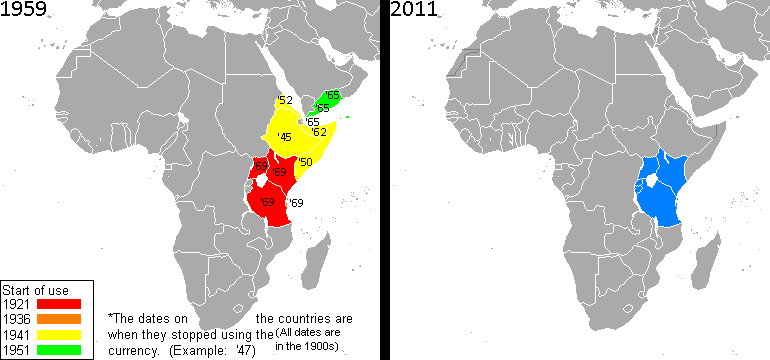
Left: countries that used the old East African Shilling. Right: the area of the proposed new East African Shilling.

== History ==
=== First East African shilling ===
Unlike elsewhere in the possessions of the British Empire that used sterling, in British East Africa the shilling instead of the pound was the primary unit of account, with the pound being a superunit mainly used for recording government and business transactions whose totals would be needlessly large if quoted solely in shillings.

This anomalous state of affairs arose because the first currency used by the British colonial authorities in British East Africa was the rupee, not sterling. The East African shilling was introduced to Kenya, Tanganyika, and Uganda in 1921, replacing the short-lived East African florin at a rate of 2 shillings to 1 florin. The florin had been introduced because of increasing silver prices after World War I. At that time, the Indian rupee was the currency of the British East African states. The rupee, being a silver coin, rose in value against sterling. When it reached the value of two shillings, the authorities decided to replace it with the florin. From the florin thence came the East African shilling. The currency remained pegged to one shilling sterling and was subdivided into 100 cents. In 1936, Zanzibar joined the currency board, and the Zanzibari rupee was replaced at a rate of 1/50 to 1 Zanzibari rupee. It was replaced by local currencies (Kenyan shilling, Ugandan shilling, and Tanzanian shilling) following the territories' independence.

In 1951, the East African shilling replaced the Indian rupee in the Aden colony and protectorate, which became the South Arabian Federation in 1963. In 1965, the East African Currency Board was breaking up, and the South Arabian dinar replaced the shilling in the South Arabian Federation at a rate of 20 shillings to 1 dinar.

The shilling was also used in parts of what is now Somalia, Ethiopia, and Eritrea when they were under British control. Before 1941, these areas, then known as Italian East Africa, used the Italian East African lira. In 1941, as a result of World War II, Britain regained control and introduced the shilling, at a rate of 1 shilling to 24 Lire. Italian Somaliland was returned to Italy in 1949 as a UN Trusteeship and soon switched to the somalo, which was at par with the shilling. British Somaliland gained independence in 1960, and joined what had been Italian Somaliland to create Somalia. In that year, Somalia began using the Somali shilling (replacing the Somali somalo) at par with the East African shilling.

Ethiopia regained independence in 1941, with British support, and began using the East African shilling. Maria Theresa thalers, Indian rupees, and Egyptian pounds were also legal tender at the beginning of this time, and it is unclear exactly when this status ended. Full sovereignty was restored in late 1944, and the Ethiopian dollar was reintroduced in 1945 at a rate of $1 = 2 shillings. Eritrea was captured from the Italians in 1941, and began using the East African shilling, as well as the Egyptian pound. The lira was demonetised in 1942. When Eritrea formed a federation with Ethiopia in 1952, the dollar, which was already in use in Ethiopia, was also adopted in Eritrea.

=== Second East African shilling ===
It has been rumoured that the East African Shilling will be revived by the East African Community, which consists of Kenya, Tanzania, Uganda, Rwanda, Burundi, South Sudan, the Democratic Republic of the Congo, and Somalia, as part of the community's monetary union. The monetary union's target date has been set to 2031 following delays caused in part due to the COVID-19 pandemic and the admission of new member states, including the DRC and Somalia.

== Coins ==
=== Issued during the reign of George V ===
Issued during the reign of George V
Image	Value	Catalogue number	Technical parameters		Description		Dates	Remarks
Image	Value	Catalogue number	Mass	Composition	Obverse	Reverse	Dates	Remarks
	1 cent	KM 22		Bronze	"GEORGIVS V", "REX ET IND:IMP:", crown, value	"EAST AFRICA", value, date	1922-1935	central hole
	5 cents	KM 18		Bronze	"GEORGIVS V", "REX ET IND:IMP:", crown, value	"EAST AFRICA", value, date	1921-1936	central hole
	10 cents	KM 19		Bronze	"GEORGIVS V", "REX ET IND:IMP:", crown, value	"EAST AFRICA", value, date	1921-1936	central hole
	50 cents 1/2 shilling	KM 20	3.8879g	25% silver	"GEORGIVS V", "REX ET IND:IMP:", bust of George V	Dual value, "EAST AFRICA", lion in front of mountain, date	1921-1924	
	1 shilling	KM 21	7.7759g	25% silver	"GEORGIVS V", "REX ET IND:IMP:", bust of George V	Value, "EAST AFRICA", lion in front of mountain, date	1921-1925	
For table standards, see the coin specification table.

=== Issued during the reign of Edward VIII ===
Issued during the reign of Edward VIII
Image	Value	Catalogue number	Composition	Description		Dates	Remarks
Image	Value	Catalogue number	Composition	Obverse	Reverse	Dates	Remarks
	5 cents	KM 23	Bronze	"EDWARDVS VIII", "REX ET IND:IMP:", crown, value	"EAST AFRICA", value, date	1936	Central hole
	10 cents	KM 24	Bronze	"EDWARDVS VIII", "REX ET IND:IMP:", crown, value	"EAST AFRICA", value, date	1936	Central hole
For table standards, see the coin specification table.

=== Issued during the reign of George VI ===
==== As GEORGIVS VI ====
Issued during the reign of George VI as GEORGIVS VI
Image	Value	Catalogue number	Technical parameters		Description		Dates	Remarks
Image	Value	Catalogue number	Mass	Composition	Obverse	Reverse	Dates	Remarks
	1 cent	KM 29		Bronze	"GEORGIVS VI", "REX ET IND:IMP:", crown, value	"EAST AFRICA", value, date	1942	central hole
	5 cents	KM 25		Bronze	"GEORGIVS VI", "REX ET IND:IMP:", crown, value	"EAST AFRICA", value, date	1936	central hole
	5 cents	KM 25.1		Bronze	"GEORGIVS VI", "REX ET IND:IMP:", crown, value	"EAST AFRICA", value, date	1937-1941	central hole, thick flan
	5 cents	KM 25.2		Bronze	"GEORGIVS VI", "REX ET IND:IMP:", crown, value	"EAST AFRICA", value, date	1941-1943	central hole, thin flan
	5 cents	KM 25.3		Bronze	"GEORGIVS VI", "REX ET IND:IMP:", crown, value	"EAST AFRICA", value, date	1942	NO central hole, thin flan
	10 cents	KM 26.1		Bronze	"GEORGIVS VI", "REX ET IND:IMP:", crown, value	"EAST AFRICA", value, date	1937-1941	some with central hole, some without, thick flan
	10 cents	KM 26.2		Bronze	"GEORGIVS VI", "REX ET IND:IMP:", crown, value	"EAST AFRICA", value, date	1942-1945	central hole, thin flan
	50 cents 1/2 shilling	KM 27	3.8879g	25% silver	"GEORGIVS VI", "REX ET INDIÆ IMPERATOR", bust of George VI	Dual value, "EAST AFRICA", lion in front of mountain, date	1937-1944	
	1 shilling	KM 28.1	7.7759g	25% silver	"GEORGIVS VI", "REX ET INDIÆ IMPERATOR", bust of George VI	Value, "EAST AFRICA", lion in front of mountain, date	1937-1944	edge reeding spaced out
	1 shilling	KM 28.2	7.7759g	25% silver	"GEORGIVS VI", "REX ET INDIÆ IMPERATOR", bust of George VI	Value, "EAST AFRICA", lion in front of mountain, date	1941	rare, thicker rim, larger milling, minor design differences
	1 shilling	KM 28.3	7.7759g	25% silver	"GEORGIVS VI", "REX ET INDIÆ IMPERATOR", bust of George VI	Value, "EAST AFRICA", lion in front of mountain, date	1942-1943	retouched central image on reverse
	1 shilling	KM 28.4	7.7759g	25% silver	"GEORGIVS VI", "REX ET INDIÆ IMPERATOR", bust of George VI	Value, "EAST AFRICA", lion in front of mountain, date	1944-1946	same as KM 28.1 with edge reeding close
For table standards, see the coin specification table.

==== As GEORGIVS SEXTVS ====
Issued during the reign of George VI as GEORGIVS SEXTVS
Image	Value	Catalogue number	Composition	Description		Dates	Remarks
Image	Value	Catalogue number	Composition	Obverse	Reverse	Dates	Remarks
	1 cent	KM 32	Bronze	"GEORGIVS SEXTVS REX", crown, value	"EAST AFRICA", value, date	1949-1952	central hole
	5 cents	KM 33	Bronze	"GEORGIVS SEXTVS REX", crown, value	"EAST AFRICA", value, date	1949-1952	central hole
	10 cents	KM 34	Bronze	"GEORGIVS SEXTVS REX", crown, value	"EAST AFRICA", value, date	1949-1952	central hole
	50 cents 1/2 shilling	KM 30	Cupronickel	"GEORGIVS SEXTVS REX", bust of George VI	Dual value, "EAST AFRICA", lion in front of mountain, date	1948-1952	
	1 shilling	KM 31	Cupronickel	"GEORGIVS SEXTVS REX", bust of George VI	Value, "EAST AFRICA", lion in front of mountain, date	1948-1952	
For table standards, see the coin specification table.

=== Issued during the reign of Elizabeth II ===
Issued during the reign of Elizabeth II
Image	Value	Catalogue number	Composition	Description		Dates	Remarks
Image	Value	Catalogue number	Composition	Obverse	Reverse	Dates	Remarks
	1 cent	KM 35	Bronze	"QUEEN ELIZABETH THE SECOND", crown, value	"EAST AFRICA", value, date	1954-1962	central hole
	5 cents	KM 37	Bronze	"QUEEN ELIZABETH THE SECOND", crown, value	"EAST AFRICA", value, date	1955-1963	central hole
	10 cents	KM 38	Bronze	"QUEEN ELIZABETH THE SECOND", crown, value	"EAST AFRICA", value, date	1956-1964	central hole
	50 cents 1/2 shilling	KM 36	Cupronickel	"QUEEN ELIZABETH THE SECOND", bust of Elizabeth II	Dual value, "EAST AFRICA", lion in front of mountain, year of minting	1954-1963	
For table standards, see the coin specification table.

=== Issued after independence ===
Issued after independence
Image	Value	Catalogue number	Composition	Description		Dates	Remarks
Image	Value	Catalogue number	Composition	Obverse	Reverse	Dates	Remarks
	5 cents	KM 39	Bronze	"SENTI TANO", 5, "FIVE CENTS", "EAST AFRICA"	"EAST AFRICA", "5", date	1964	central hole
	10 cents	KM 40	Bronze	"SENTI KUMI", 10, "TEN CENTS", "EAST AFRICA"	"EAST AFRICA", "10", date	1964	central hole
For table standards, see the coin specification table.

Krause, Chester L.; Clifford Mishler (2003). Colin R. Bruce II (ed.). 2004 Standard Catalog of World Coins: 1901–Present (31st ed.). Krause Publications. ISBN 0873495934.

== Banknotes ==
In 1921, notes were issued by the East African Currency Board in denominations of 5/-, 10/-, 20/-, 100/-, 200/-, 1,000/- and 10,000/-, with the notes of 20 shillings and above having their denominations expressed also in pounds (£1, £5, £10, £50 and £500). In 1943, 1/- notes were issued, the only occasion that such notes were produced. 1,000/- notes were only issued until 1933, with 10,000/- notes last issued in 1947. The remaining denominations were issued until 1964.

Shilling denominations were written on banknotes in English, Arabic, and Gujarati, while values in pounds were written in English only.

== Gallery ==
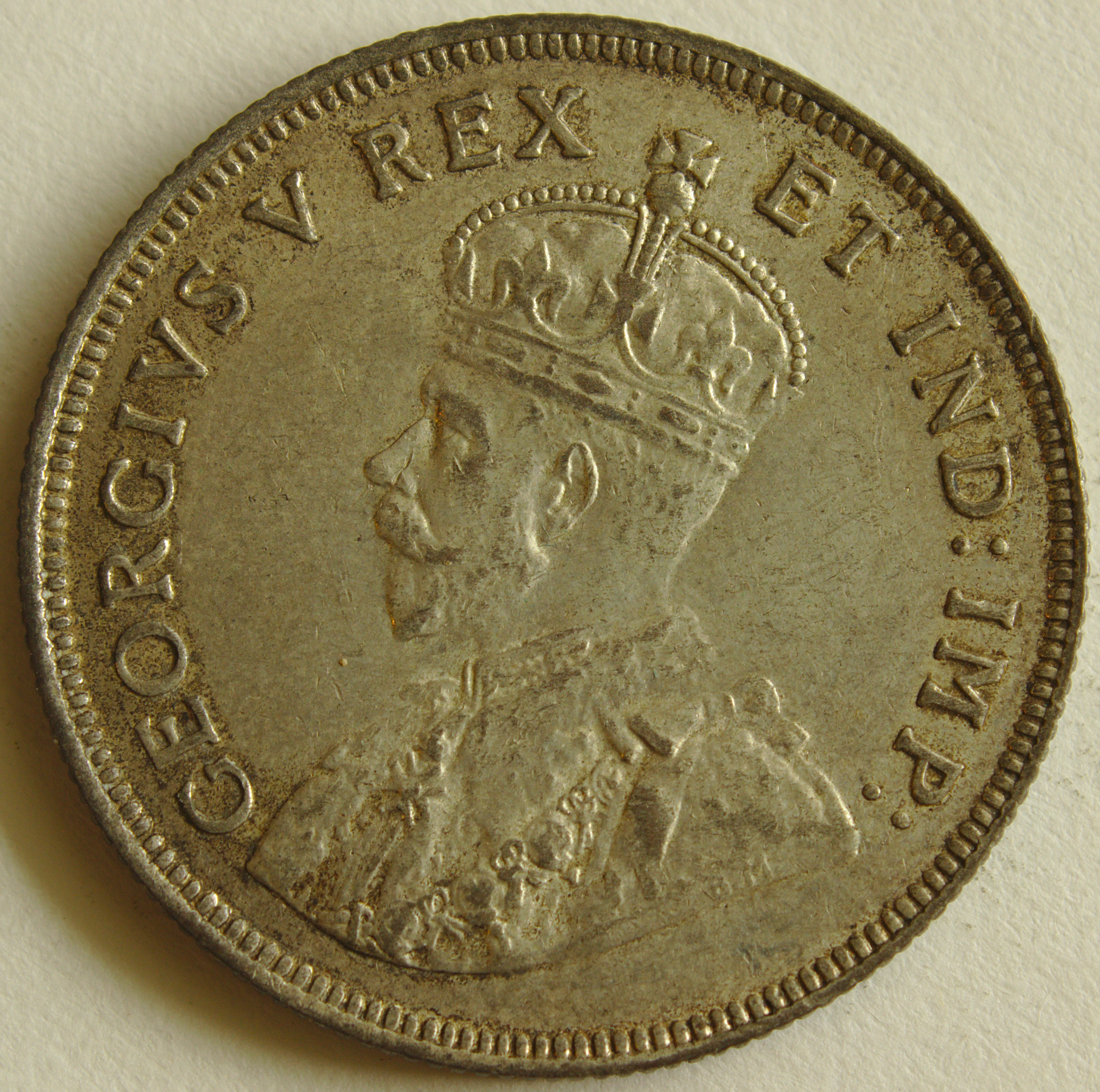
1925 East African 1 Shilling coin obverse

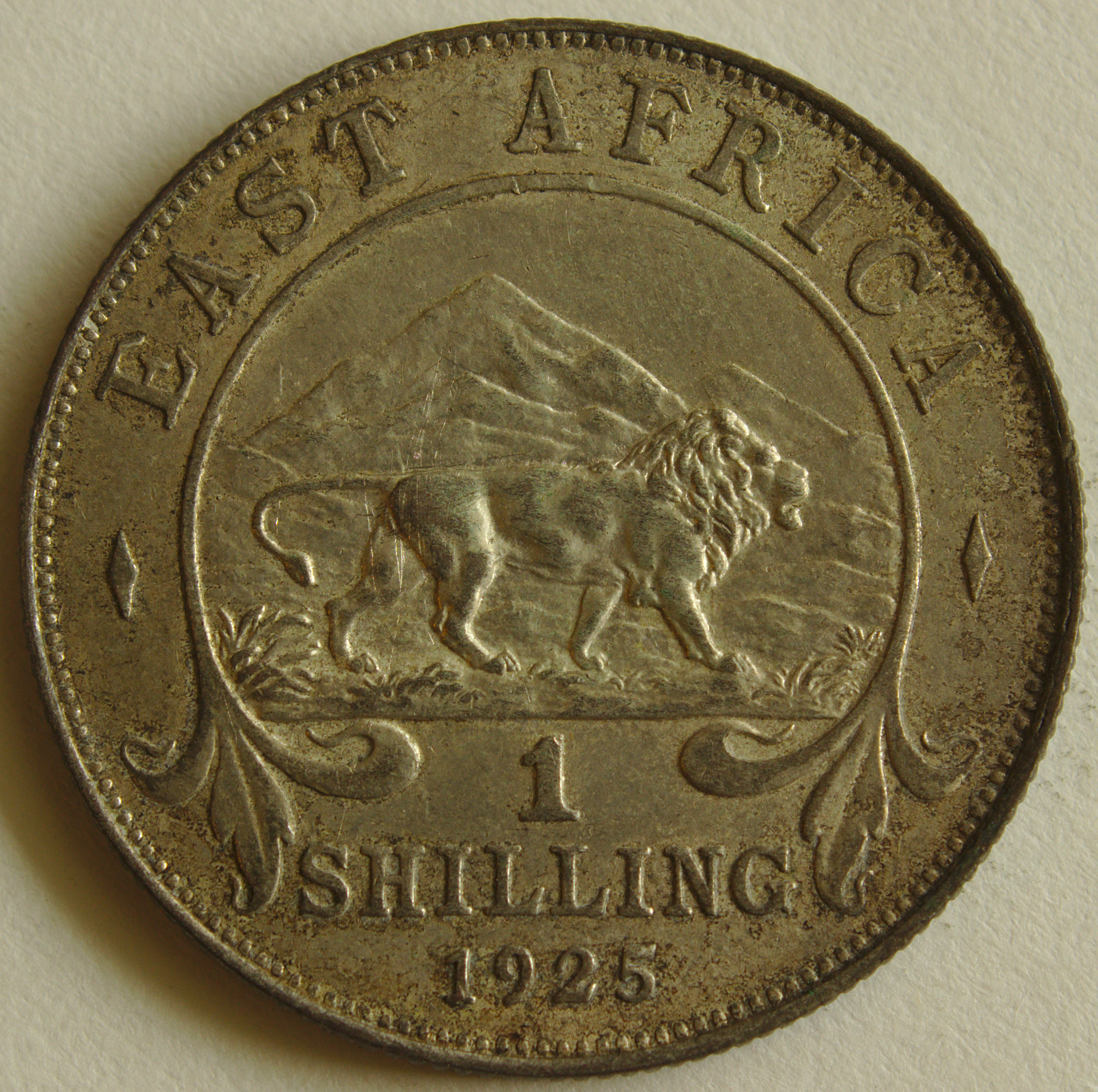
1925 East African 1 Shilling coin reverse

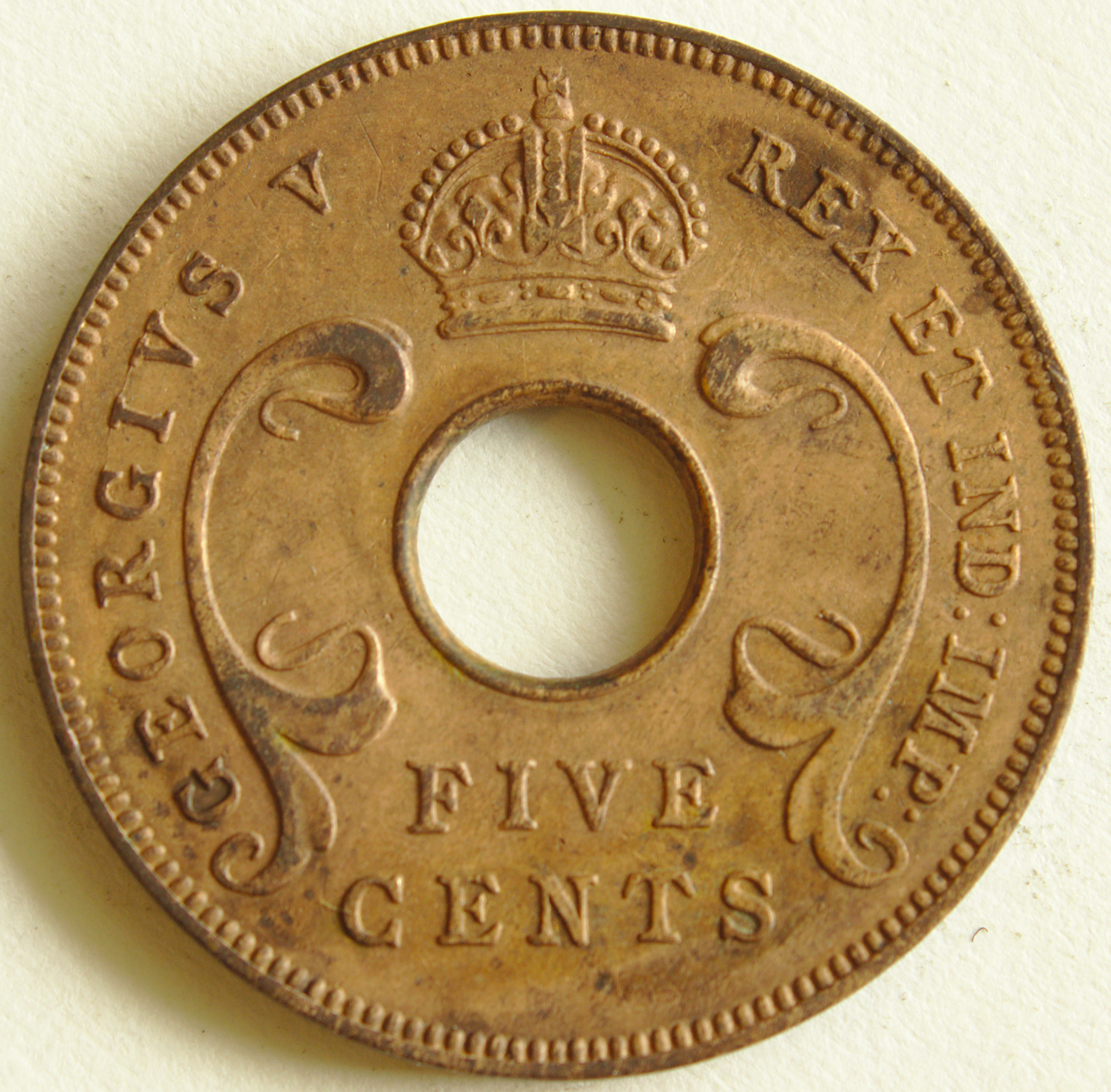
1935 East African 5 cent coin obverse

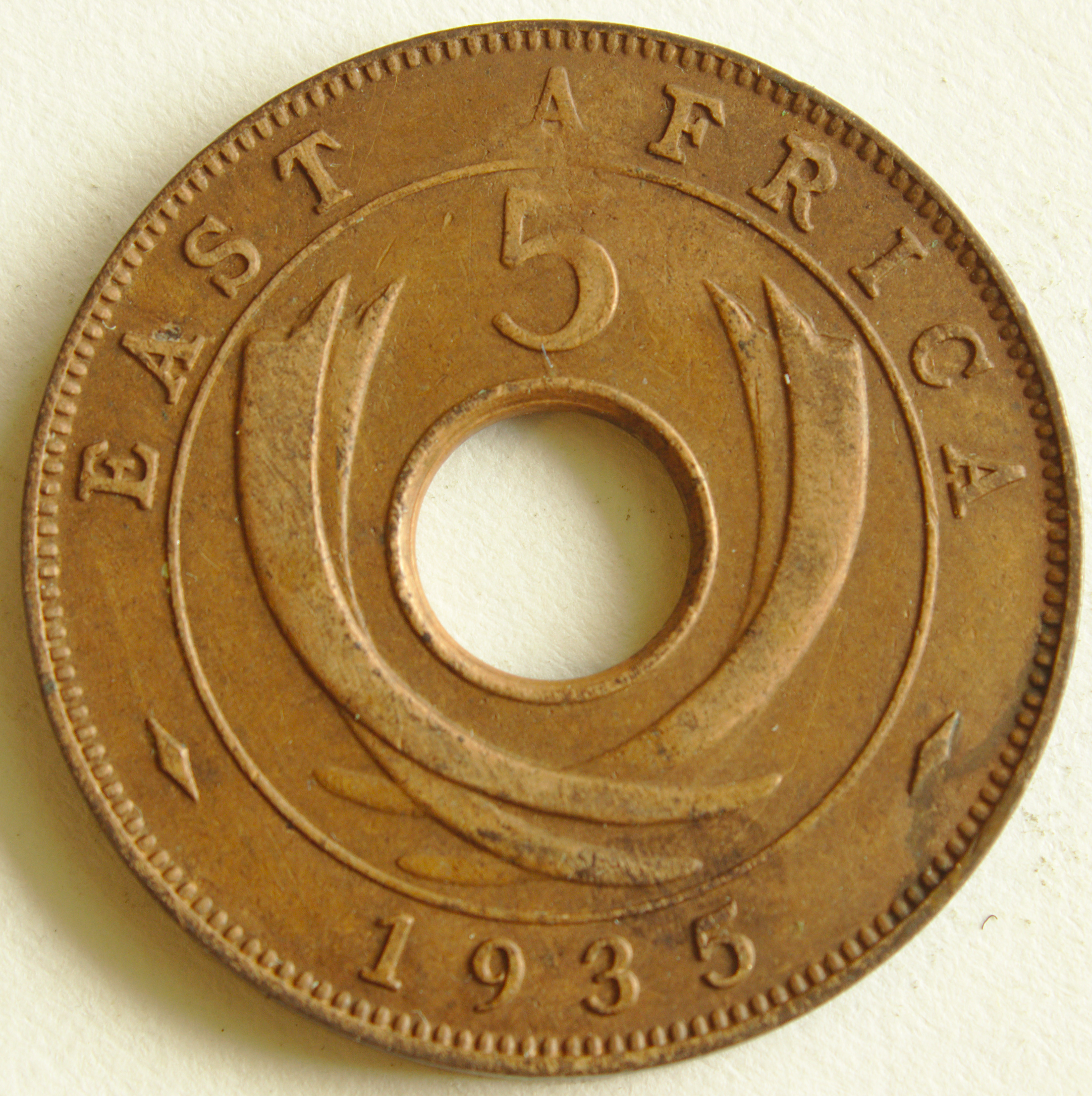
1935 East African 5 cent coin reverse

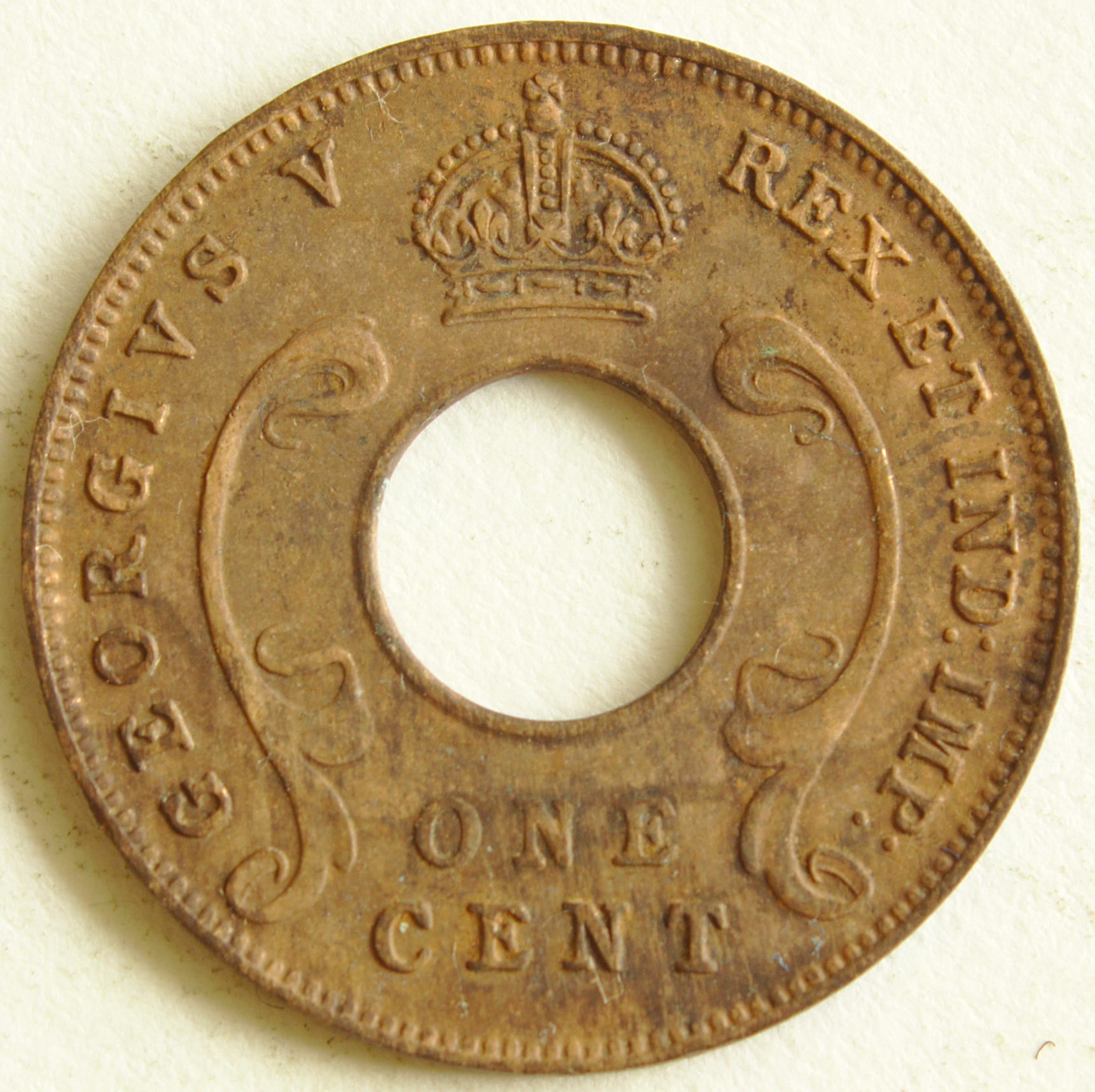
1930 East African 1 cent coin obverse

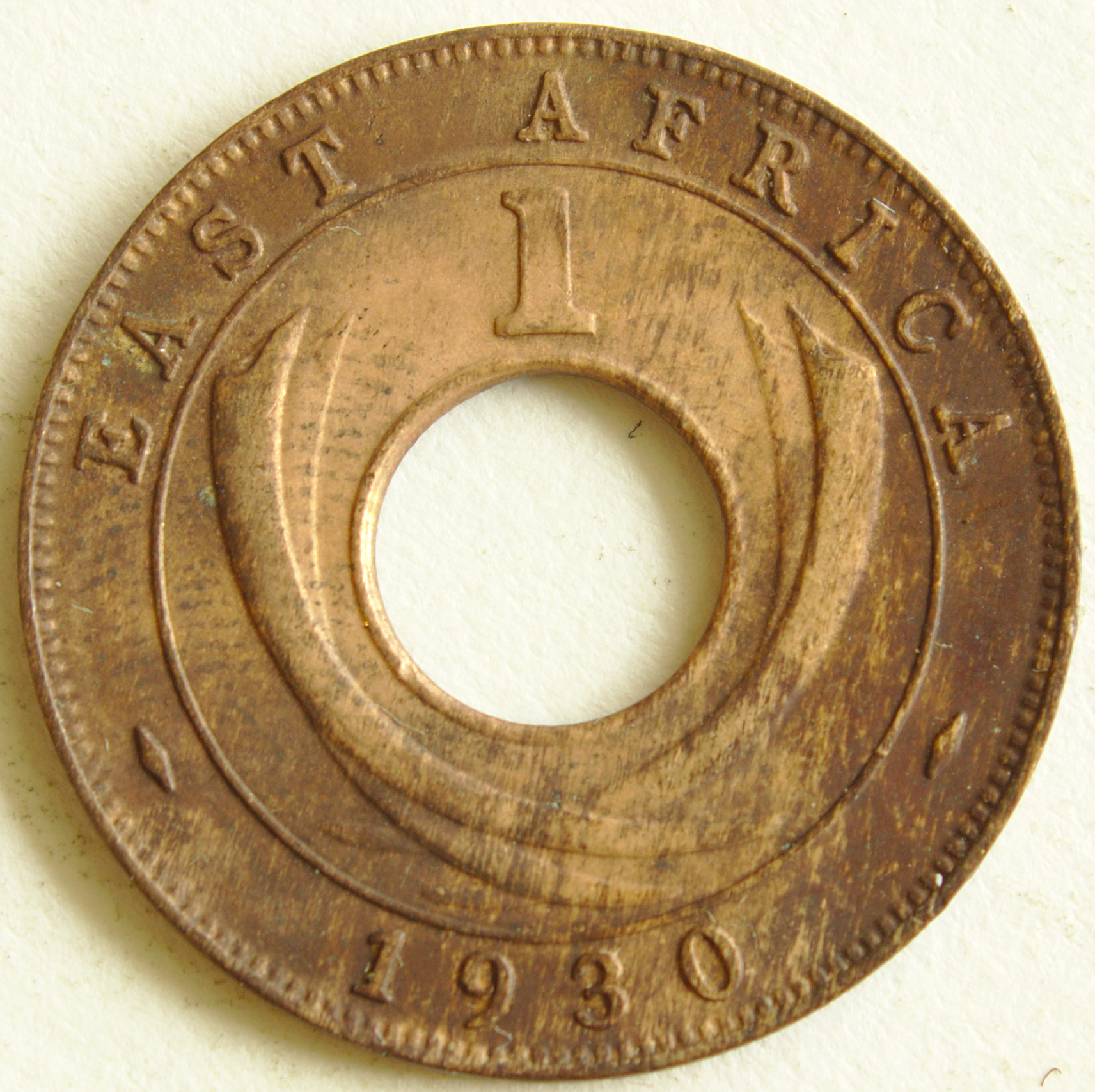
1930 East African 1 cent coin reverse

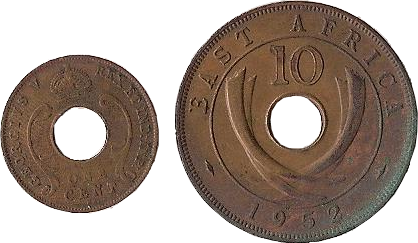
British East Africa 1 cent and 10 cent coins

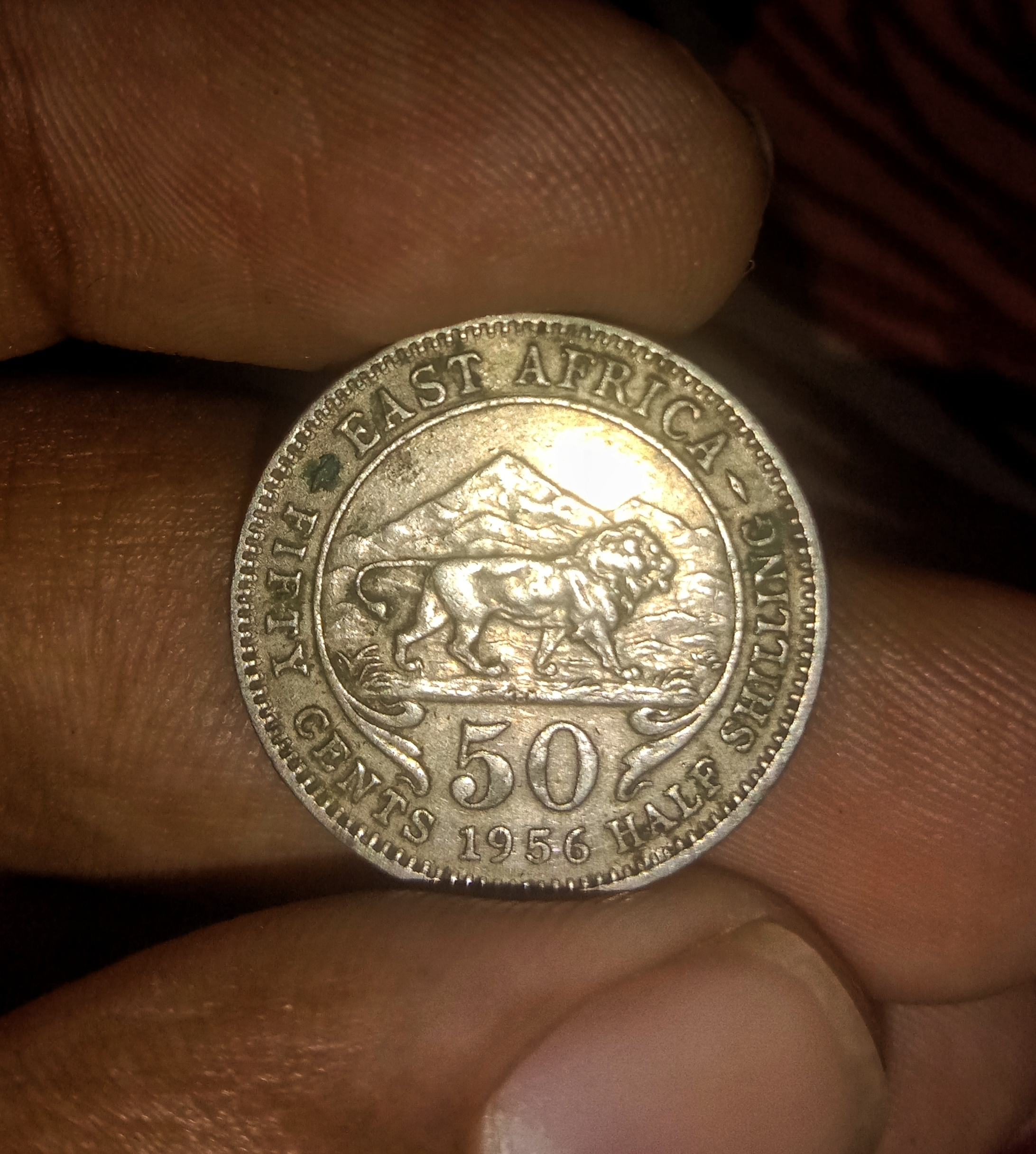
1956 East African half shilling coin reverse

== See also ==
- British currency in the Middle East

Preceded by: Indian rupee, Maria Theresa Thaler and other foreign currencies Ratio: Various	Currency of Colony of Aden; 1951 – 1963		Currency of Federation of South Arabia; 1963 – 1965	Succeeded by: South Yemeni dinar Ratio: 1 dinar = 20 shillings
Preceded by: Indian rupee, Maria Theresa Thaler and other foreign currencies Ratio: Various	Currency of Aden Protectorate; 1951 – 1959	Currency of Federation of Arab Emirates of the South; 1959 – 1963	Currency of Federation of South Arabia; 1963 – 1965	Succeeded by: South Yemeni dinar Ratio: 1 dinar = 20 shillings
Preceded by: Indian rupee, Maria Theresa Thaler and other foreign currencies Ratio: Various	Currency of Aden Protectorate; 1951 – 1959	Currency of remainder of Aden Protectorate; 1959 – 1963; Note: throughout this time period, various states within the protectorate joined the federation	Currency of Protectorate of South Arabia; 1963 – 1965	Succeeded by: South Yemeni dinar Ratio: 1 dinar = 20 shillings
Preceded by: Zanzibari rupee Ratio: 1 1/2 shillings = 1 Zanzibari rupee = 1 Indian rupee	Currency of Zanzibar; January 1, 1936 – 1964		Currency of Tanzania (formerly Tanganyika and Zanzibar); 1964 – 1969	Succeeded by: Tanzanian shilling Reason: currency independence Ratio: at par Note: independent shilling introduced in 1966, but EA shilling not demonetized until 1969
Preceded by: East African florin Ratio: 2 shillings = 1 florin	Currency of East Africa (Kenya, Tanganyika, Uganda); 1921 – various dates of independence		Currency of Tanzania (formerly Tanganyika and Zanzibar); 1964 – 1969	Succeeded by: Tanzanian shilling Reason: currency independence Ratio: at par Note: independent shilling introduced in 1966, but EA shilling not demonetized until 1969
Preceded by: East African florin Ratio: 2 shillings = 1 florin	Currency of East Africa (Kenya, Tanganyika, Uganda); 1921 – various dates of independence		Currency of Kenya; 1963 – 1969	Succeeded by: Kenyan shilling Reason: currency independence Ratio: at par Note: independent shilling introduced in 1966, but EA shilling not demonetized until 1969
Preceded by: East African florin Ratio: 2 shillings = 1 florin	Currency of East Africa (Kenya, Tanganyika, Uganda); 1921 – various dates of independence		Currency of Uganda; 1962 – 1969	Succeeded by: First Ugandan shilling Reason: currency independence Ratio: at par Note: independent shilling introduced in 1966, but EA shilling not demonetized until 1969
Preceded by: Italian East African lira Reason: United Kingdom recaptured British Somaliland from Italy, and also occupied Italian East Africa; Ratio: 1 shilling = 24 lire	Currency of British Somaliland; 1941 – 1962			Succeeded by: Somali shilling Reason: independence as part of Somalia; Ratio: at par
Preceded by: Italian East African lira Reason: United Kingdom recaptured British Somaliland from Italy, and also occupied Italian East Africa; Ratio: 1 shilling = 24 lire	Currency of Italian Somaliland; 1941 – 1950			Succeeded by: Italian Somaliland somalo Reason: return to Italy (in 1949); Ratio: at par
Preceded by: Italian East African lira Reason: United Kingdom recaptured British Somaliland from Italy, and also occupied Italian East Africa; Ratio: 1 shilling = 24 lire	Currency of Ethiopia; 1941 – 1945			Succeeded by: Ethiopian dollar Reason: (Ethiopia) independence (Eritrea) federation with Ethiopia; Ratio: 1 dollar = 2 shillings
Preceded by: Italian East African lira Reason: United Kingdom recaptured British Somaliland from Italy, and also occupied Italian East Africa; Ratio: 1 shilling = 24 lire	Currency of Eritrea; 1941 – 1952			Succeeded by: Ethiopian dollar Reason: (Ethiopia) independence (Eritrea) federation with Ethiopia; Ratio: 1 dollar = 2 shillings
