= East African Currency Board =

UK issuer of the East African shilling

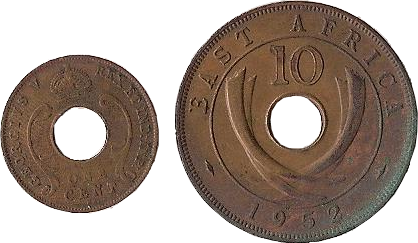
East African shilling 1 cent and 10 cent coins (1952)

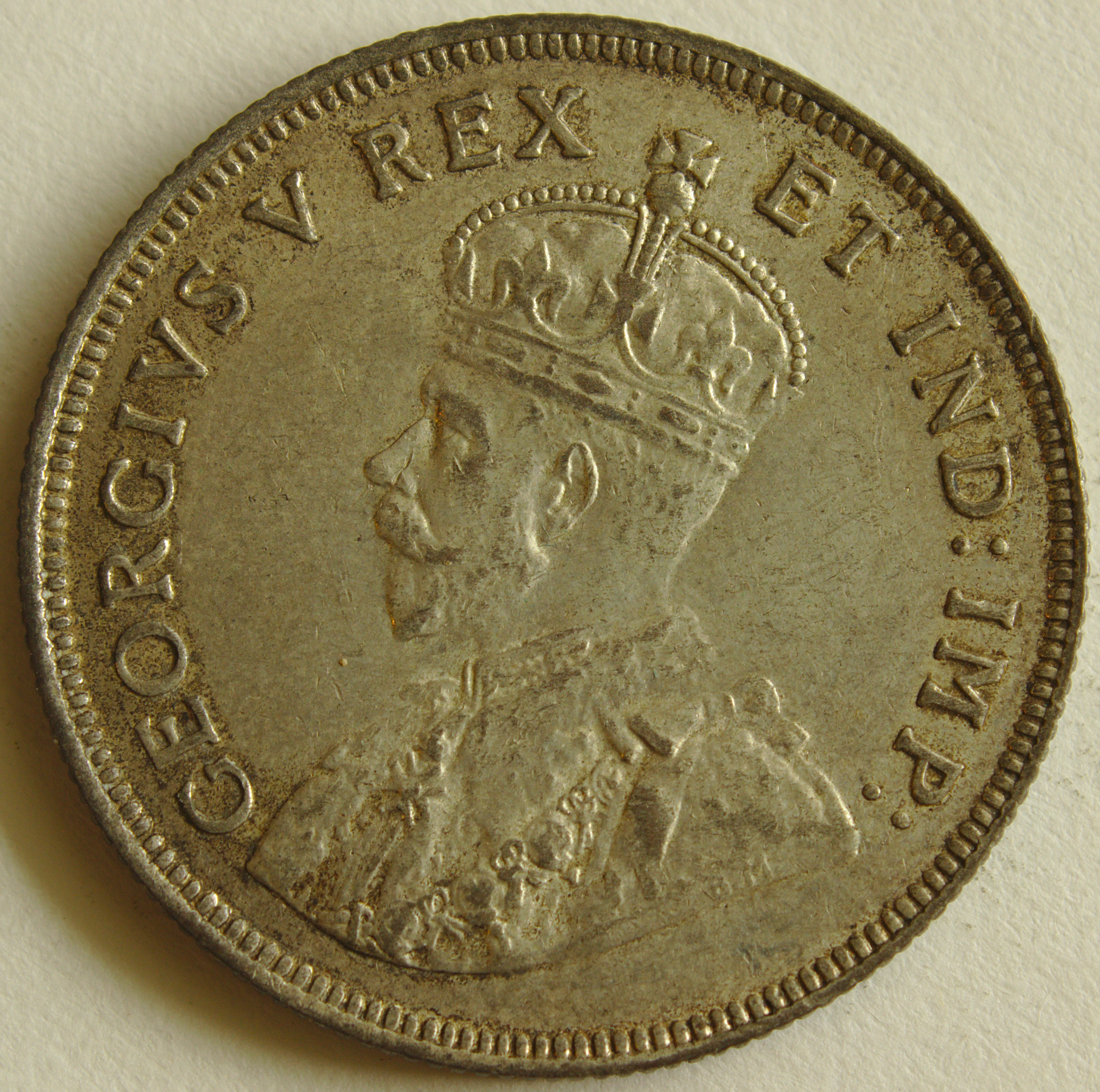
1925 East African shilling, obverse

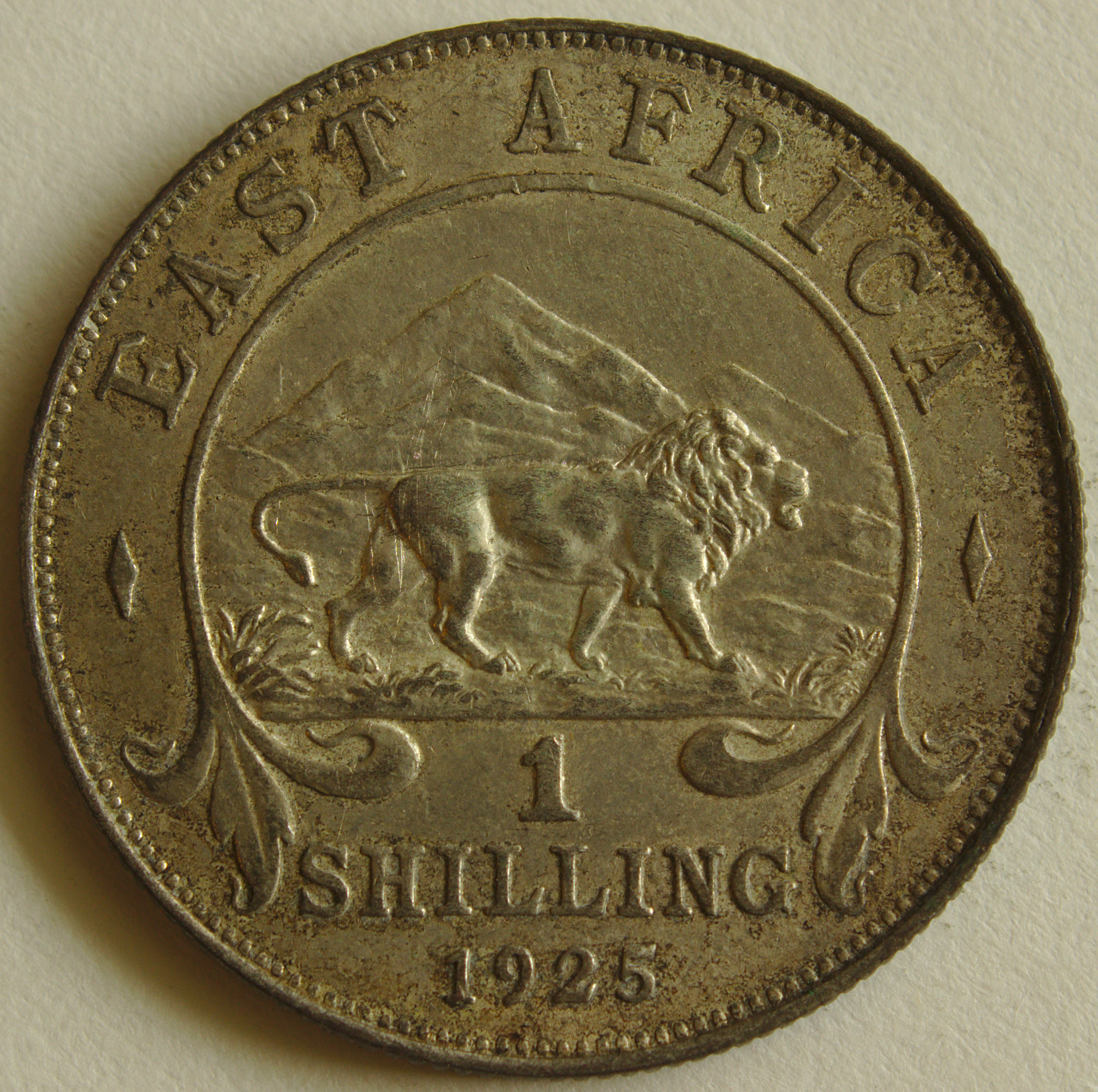
1925 East African shilling, reverse

The East African Currency Board (EACB) was established in 1919 to supply and oversee the currency of British colonies in British East Africa. It was established after Britain took control of mainland Tanzania from Germany at the end of World War I, and originally oversaw the territories of Uganda, Kenya, and Tanzania (excluding Zanzibar). Zanzibar joined the currency area in 1936. In 1941, parts of what are now Somalia, Ethiopia, and Eritrea started using the East African shilling while under British wartime control. From 1951 to 1965, it was used in the colony and protectorate of Aden.

The board operated out of premises at 4 Millbank, London SW1, one time the offices of the Crown Agents.

For most of its existence, the EACB's main function was to issue and maintain the local East African shilling at par with the British shilling. This was done by ensuring that the local currency was adequately backed by sterling securities.

Following independence of the three countries, the East African Currency Board eventually gave way to the Bank of Tanzania in 1965, then to the Central Bank of Kenya and Bank of Uganda in 1966-1967.

== History ==
The Board was established originally in the Kenya and Uganda protectorates. It was dissolved in 1967.

== Function ==
The Secretary of State for the Colonies of the United Kingdom was in charge of the operation of currency boards.

The East African Board was responsible for minting coins, printing notes, fixing the denominations of coins and notes, and, crucially, exchanging East African Shilings for pounds and vice versa at a rate of 20 shillings for one pound sterling. It issued commissions for exchanges at no more than half a percent.

Profits of EACB, i.e., revenue after deduction of all expenses and of any contributions it made to the constituent territories, were to be credited to the currency reserve fund; losses were to be debited to this fund. EACB was allowed to invest its funds in public sterling securities or in such other manner as approved by the Secretary of State. The extent of investments was left to the discretion of EACB, but it was obliged to hold, subject to any directions from the Secretary of State, a sufficient proportion of its reserves in a liquid form.

The board mainly dealt with commercial banks operating in East Africa, though in theory it had the authority to deal with any person or entity. (There were specific transaction limits.)

=== Scope ===
Originally, the East African Currency Board was set up to operate in the Kenya Colony and Protectorate and the Uganda Protectorate, upon its establishment in 1919. Tanganyika was added the following year, after the British Empire established a League of Nations mandate there. Zanzibar was added in 1936.

During World War 2, they added Eritrea, Somaliland and Ethiopia, with the latter leaving to switch to the Ethiopian dollar at the end of the war at a rate of 1 birr per 2 shillings. In 1950, when the former Italian Somaliland became a UN Trust Territory administered by Italy, it left the Shilling in favour of the Somalo at par. A year later, the Shilling was made the official currency of British Somaliland and Aden, but the former left in 1961 for the Somali shilling at par. Aden became part of the Federation of South Arabia in 1963, replacing the currency two years later with the Yemeni dinar at the rate 1 dinar = 20 shillings.

== See also ==
- List of central banks
