= Dutch New Guinean gulden =

Currency

The gulden was the currency of Dutch New Guinea until 1963. Until 1950, issues of the Netherlands Indies circulated. A separate currency came into being when West New Guinea became the only part of the Netherlands Indies to remain in Dutch control. The currency was fixed at parity with the Dutch gulden. It circulated until Dutch New Guinea became part of Indonesia as West Irian in 1963. That year, the West Irian rupiah replaced the gulden at par.

== Banknotes ==
Two series of banknotes were issued for Dutch New Guinea: one in 1950 and another in 1954. Both series consisted of denominations of 1, 2 1/2, 5, 10, 25, 100 and 500 gulden.
