= East African florin =

Currency of British East Africa from 1920 until 1921

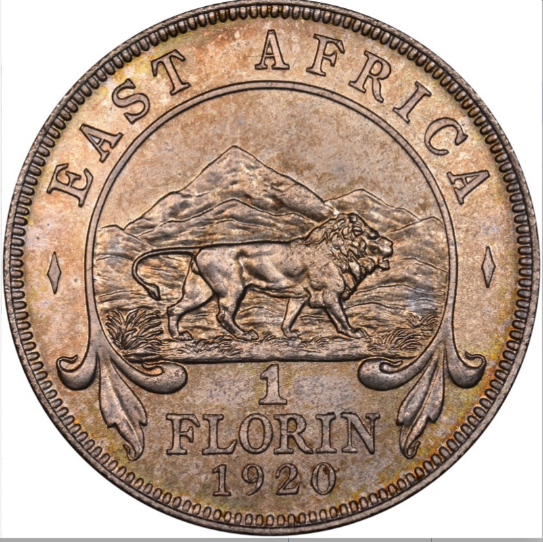
The back of an East African florin dated 1920

The Florin was the currency of the British colonies and protectorates of East Africa between 1920 and 1921. It was divided into 100 cents. It replaced the East African rupee at par, and was replaced in turn by the East African shilling at a rate of 2 shillings = 1 florin. The florin was equivalent to 2 shillings sterling.

== Coins ==
Because of its short period in existence, few of the coins minted were actually issued and are consequently scarce today. Coins were minted in denominations of 1, 5, 10, 25 and 50 cents and 1 florin but, according to the "Standard Catalog of World Coins" (C. L. Krause & C. Mishler, Krause Publications), the 50 cents coins were not released for circulation and only 30% of the 1, 5 and 10 cent coins produced were issued for circulation.

== Banknotes ==
The East African Currency Board issued notes in denominations of 1, 5, 10, 20, 50, 100 and 500 florins, with the notes valued at 10 florins and above also carrying the denomination in pounds (1, 2, 5, 10 and 50).

Preceded by: East African rupee Ratio: at par	Currency of East Africa (Kenya, Tanganyika, Uganda); July 31, 1920 – December 31, 1921	Succeeded by: East African shilling Ratio: 2 shillings = 1 florin = 2 British shillings
