= Danish Indian rupee =

The Danish Indian rupee was the currency of Danish India. It was subdivided into 8 fano, each of 80 kas. In 1845, Danish India became part of British India and the local rupee was replaced by the Indian rupee. Danish Indian rupees ranged from 6-10 mm in size depending on the type of coin, and ~0.5 to ~1.1 grams in weight.
