= Perum Peruri =

Security printer of Indonesia

Moneyprinting Public Corporation of the Republic of Indonesia
- Logo since 2024
- Trade name: Peruri
- Native name: Perusahaan Umum Percetakan Uang Republik Indonesia
- Type: Statutory corporation
- Industry: Security printing, mint, technology
- Predecessor: PN Pertjetakan Kebajoran; PN Artha Yasa
- Founded: 15 September 1971
- Founder: Pertjetakan Kebajoran: Government of Indonesia and Joh. Enschedé as Pertjetakan Kebajoran PT; Joh. Enschedé stocks bought around 1959-60; PN Artha Yasa: Government of Indonesia
- Headquarters: Jakarta, Indonesia
- Key people: Dwina Septiani Wijaya (CEO)
- Products: Banknotes; Coins; Passports; Stamps; Excise stamps; Land documents; Electronic signatures; Electronic stamps; Government technology
- Brands: Peruri Sign; Peruri Code; Peruri Trust; INA Digital
- Services: Money printing; Security socument Printing; Digital security service; Government Technology
- Revenue: ▲IDR 4.441 trillion (2023); IDR 2.410 trillion (2016)
- Net income: ▲IDR 428.413 billion (2023); IDR 161 billion (2016)
- Total assets: ▲IDR 6.551 trillion (2023); IDR 3.639 trillion (2016)
- Total equity: ▲IDR 4.196 trillion (2023); IDR 2.033 trillion (2016)
- Owner: Danantara
- Number of employees: 1,848 (2023)
- Subsidiaries: PT Peruri Properti; PT Kertas Padalarang; PT Peruri Wira Timur; PT Peruri Digital Security; PT Cardsindo Tiga Perkasa; (Grandchild company); PT Sicpa Peruri Securink (Affiliate company)
- Website: www.peruri.co.id

The Moneyprinting Public Corporation of the Republic of Indonesia (Indonesian: Perusahaan Umum Percetakan Uang Republik Indonesia), trading as Peruri (stylized in all caps), is an Indonesian statutory corporation which acts as the country's banknote printer, national mint, and government systems integrator.

== History ==
Peruri is a state-owned enterprise (BUMN) that was established through Government Regulation Number 60 of 1971, the result of a merger between the State Company (a.k.a. PN) Pertjetakan Kebajoran (a.k.a. Perkeba) which has a banknote printing business, with PN Arta Yasa which has a coin making business.

Printers Pertjetakan Kebajoran had originally been established with assistance from Dutch banknote printers Joh. Enschedé.

It has offices in Jakarta, Karawang and Surabaya, with marketing and administrative functions taking place in Jakarta, and printing and minting occurring in Karawang and Surabaya.

In 1991, Peruri built a new factory on 202 hectares of land located in Ciampel, Karawang, which was inaugurated by the 6th President of Indonesia, Susilo Bambang Yudhoyono, in 2005. In, 2011, PERURI was assigned by the government to acquire PT Kertas Padalarang which had stopped operating since the end of 2008, due to difficulties in obtaining capital.

In 2019, Peruri expanded into the digital security services business, by providing electronic authentication, electronic identity, electronic signature, electronic stamp, electronic seal, secure QR code, and graph analytic services. In 2021, PERURI was assigned by the government of Indonesia to create an electronic stamp, through Government Regulation Number 86 of 2021, and at the end of 2023 PERURI was assigned an additional task as a Government Technology Agency (GovTech Indonesia) through Presidential Regulation Number 82 of 2023, to integrate government-owned digital services.

== Role ==
Based on Government Regulation Number 6 of 2019, the latest regulation governing PERURI, it is stated that PERURI's business activities include:

1. Printing Rupiah currency, to meet the needs according to Bank Indonesia's request;
2. Create state documents that have security features, in the form of Immigration Documents and Stamp Items, to meet the needs of the competent authorities;
3. Create other documents for the state, which have security features in the form of Excise Stamps and Land Documents;
4. Create other documents for countries that have security features and non-monetary metal printed materials;
5. Printing currency and making documents for other countries that have security features at the request of the country concerned, as long as the printing of Rupiah Currency has been fulfilled;
6. Providing services that have security features related to the aims and objectives and business activities of the company;
7. Fabrication of paper money, security paper and security ink and;
8. Digital security services.

Every product printed or produced by PERURI has special characteristics that prioritize security factors to maintain the authenticity of a document, considering that the document is a very vital state document and the authenticity of PERURI digital service users.

PERURI has also been trusted to print important documents belonging to other countries, including Malaysia, Sri Lanka, Nepal, the Philippines and Peru.

== Organization ==
The following is the composition of the Peruri Board of Directors as of June 2024:

- Dwina Septiani Wijaya as President Director (2022–2027)
- Gandung Anggoro Murdani as Director of Human Resource, Technology and Information (2020–2025)
- Saiful Bahri as Director of Currency and Security Solution (2022–2027)
- Fajar Rizki as Director of Finance and Risk Management (2023–2028)
- Farah Fitria Rahmayanti as Director of Digital Business (2023–2028)

The following is the composition of the Peruri Board of Supervisors as of June 2024:

- Djanurindro Wibowo as member of the Board of Supervisors
- Djoko Hendratto as member of the Board of Supervisors
- Nanik Murwati as member of the Board of Supervisors

== Offices ==
Peruri has 2 locations, namely:

1. Head Office: Jalan Palatehan Number 4, Melawai, Kebayoran Baru, South Jakarta - Indonesia.
2. Factory: Jalan Tarum Barat, Parung Mulya Village, Ciampel District, Karawang Regency, West Java - Indonesia.
