= Piastra =

Piastra may refer to:

- Historical currencies used in some parts of what became Italy before unification in the 19th century:

- Neapolitan piastra
- Sicilian piastra
- Two Sicilies piastra

- Historical currency of Gran Colombia

== See also ==
- piastre
