= Scudo =

Scudo may refer to:

== Currency ==
- Bolivian scudo
- Italian scudo
- Lombardy-Venetia scudo
- Maltese scudo
- Milanese scudo
- Papal States scudo
- Piedmont scudo
- Sardinian scudo

== Other ==
- Fiat Scudo, a medium-sized van
