= Scuta =

"Scuta" is the plural of the Latin word "scutum" and means "shield". It is used for the following:

- Scutum (shield), the Roman shield
- Scute, a zootomical term

== See also ==
- Scudo (disambiguation), various currencies
