= Commemorative coins of Italy =

Italian commemorative coins are coins issued to commemorate significant events, figures, cultural themes, or other occasions. They are minted by the Institute of Political Studies in Rome (IPZS). The coins discussed in this article include silver and gold commemorative coins in denominations of €10, €15, €20, and €50, as well as a €2 bimetallic commemorative coin issued by the Bank of Italy. Examples of these coins are listed in the article by denomination, year of issue, and commemorative theme.

- 10 euros silver
- 15 euros silver
- 20 euros gold
- 50 euros gold

€2 commemorative coins are issued by the Banco d'Italia (EU countries are allowed 2 x commemorative 2 Euro coins per year).

== €2 - bi-metallic ==
- 2004 - World Food
- 2005 - European Constitution
- 2006 - The Winter Olympics in Torino

== €10 coins ==
- 2003 - Italian's Presidency of the E.U.
- 2004 - Genoa, European capital of culture

== €15 coins ==
- 2003 - Dittico Europa Dei Popoli
- 2004 - Giacomo Puccini - the centenary of Madam Butterfly
- 2005 - Olympic Games 2006 Torino - Second mint : ski et ice-hockey.

== €20 coins ==
- 2004 - Europe and arts - Belgium : René Magritte
- 2005 - Olympic Games 2006 Torino - First mint : Porte Palatine in Torino
- 2005 - Olympic Games 2006 Torino - Second mint : Palazzo Madama in Torino

== €50 coins ==
- 2003 - Europe and arts - Austria
- 2004 - Europe and arts - Denmark

== See also ==
- History of coins in Italy
