= Tornesel =

Silver coin from Europe

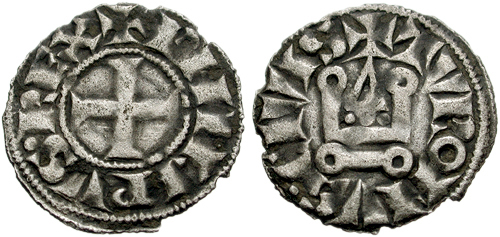
A denier tournois; inscription reads: +PHILIPVS•REX / +TVRONVS•CIVI[TATI]S.

The tornesel, tornesol, or tornese was a silver coin of Europe in the Late Middle Ages and the early modern era.

== History ==
It took its name from the denier tournois, the denier of Tours. Marco Polo referred to the tornesel in recounts of his travels to East Asia when describing the currencies of the Yuan Empire. His descriptions were based on the conversion of 1 bezant = 20 groats = 133⅓ tornesel.

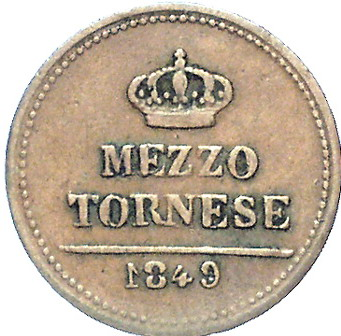
The reverse of a Two Sicilies ½-tornese coin

The tornese was a subunit of the Neapolitan, Sicilian, and Two Sicilies ducats.

== See also ==
- History of coins in Italy
