= Cagliarese =

Coins from Cagliari, Sardinia, Italy

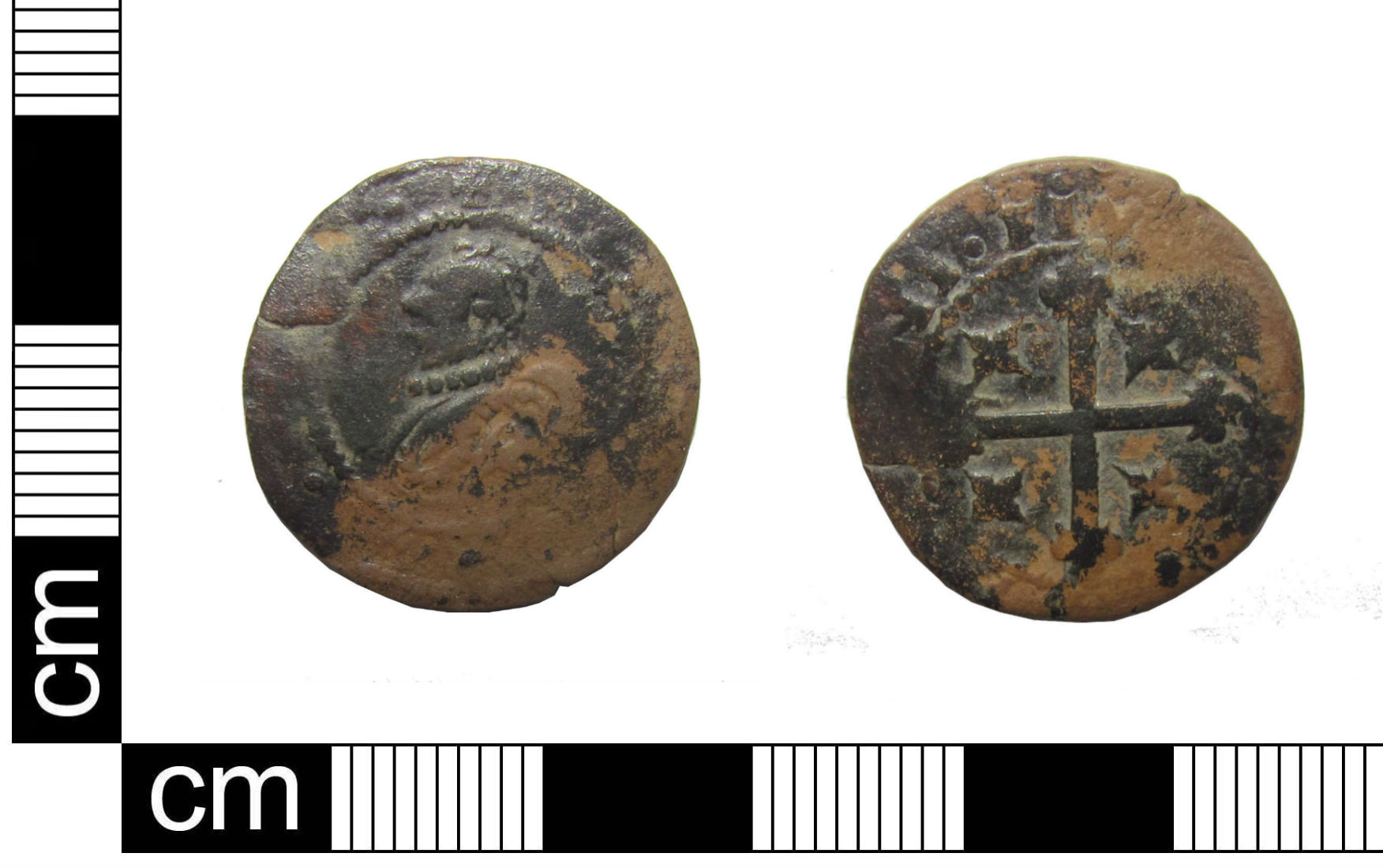
Copper-alloy soldo (6 cagliaresi) of Philip III of Spain (r. 1598–1621)

Cagliarese or callaresito is the name of a series of coins minted at Cagliari (Sardinia).

== History ==
The first Cagliarese, in billon and weighing 0.80 g, was issued by Ferdinand II of Aragon, for a value of two deniers. In the 16th century, under King Charles II, it became in copper.

After the cession of Sardinia to the House of Savoy, the Cagliarese was coined until 1813. Victor Amadeus II minted the 1 and 3 cagliaresi coins, in copper (1720). They sported the profile of the new King, and weighed 2.35 and 6.75 grams, respectively. Victor Amadeus' son, Charles Emmanuel II, added the Mezzo Cagliarese (1/2-Cagliarese) also in copper.

After the reformation of 1754, a new Cagliarese in copper, with a weight of 2.34 g and a diameter of 18 mm, was issued.

Under Charles Emmanuel III (1796–1802) the cagliarese was not issued. Victor Emmanuel I issued a 3 cagliaresi coin, around 1813.

The cagliarese disappeared in 1821, when the Scudo (120 Cagliarese) was replaced by the Sardinian Lira, which was divided into 100 centesimi.

=== Cagliarese (also called Callaresito) ===
The cagliarese was a series of coins made in Cagliari.

The first cagliarese of billon with the weight of 0.80 g, was issued by Ferdinand II of Aragon with a value of two denarii. In the 16th century, with Carlo II, it became a copper coin.

After Sardinia was given to the House of Savoy, the cagliarese (their coin) kept being made until 1813.

=== Victor Amadeus II ===
Victor Amadeus II (ruled 1718–1730) got the Sardinian crown in 1720 thanks to the Treaty of The Hague, and he made copper coins worth 1 and 3 cagliaresi.

- The 1 cagliarese weighed 2.35 g and had a diameter of 19 mm.
- The 3 cagliaresi weighed 6.75 g and had a diameter of 24 mm. Both coins had the king's profile facing right with VIC AM D G REX SAR CYP ET IER around it (that's “Victor Amadeus, by the grace of God, King of Sardinia, Cyprus, and Jerusalem”). On the back, there was the cross with four brunnette heads and DVX SAB ET MONTISF PRINC PED (“Duke of Savoy and Monferrat, Prince of Piedmont”). The three cagliaresi coin also had “3 C” next to the king's bust to show its value.

=== Carlo Emmanuel III ===
Carlo Emanuele III (1730–1773) initially issued coins for Sardinia similar to those of his father, adding the copper mezzo cagliarese (½ cagliarese).

After the 1754 reform, a new copper cagliarese was introduced, weighing about 2.34 g with a diameter of 18 mm.

- Obverse: Cross with the four brunnette heads and the inscription CAR EM D G REX SAR (Carlo Emanuele, by the grace of God, King of Sardinia).
- Reverse: Savoy knot between palm branches

== Equivalencies to other Sardinian denominations, in 1816 ==
- 2 Denari to the Cagliarese
- 6 Cagliarese to the Soldo
- 30 Cagliarese to the Real
- 120 Cagliarese to the Lira
- 300 Cagliarese to the Scudo
- 600 Cagliarese to the Doppietta

== See also ==
- History of coins in Italy
