= Parman lira =

Currency of Parma

lira nuova (Italian)
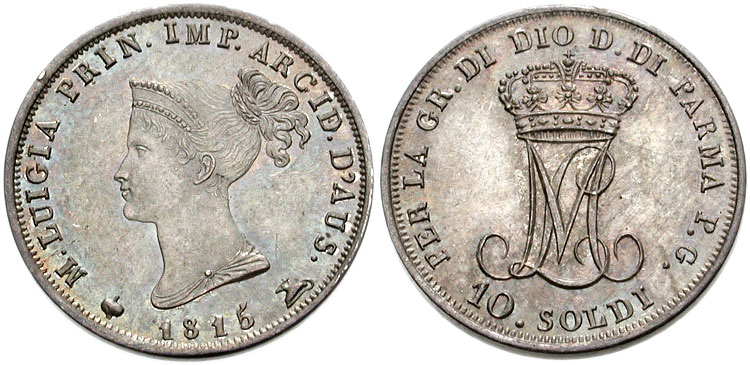
- 10 soldi coin by Marie Louise

Unit
- Nickname: franc

Denominations
- Subunit
- 1/20: soldo
- 1/100: centesimo
- Coins: c.1, c.3, c.5 s.5, s.10, L.1, L.2, L.5
- Rarely used: L.20, L.40

Demographics
- Official user(s): Parma
- Unofficial user(s): Monaco, France, Piedmont, Andorra

Issuance
- Mint: Milan Mint, Parma Mint

Valuation
- Pegged with: French franc
- This infobox shows the latest status before this currency was rendered obsolete.

The lira (plural: lire) was the distinct currency of Parma before 1802 and again from 1815 to 1859.

== History ==
=== First lira ===
The Duchy of Parma issued its own currency until it was annexed to France in 1802. This lira was subdivided into 20 soldi (singular: soldo), each of 12 denari (singular: denaro), with the sesino worth 6 denari and the ducato was worth 7 lire. The currency was replaced by the French franc.

=== Second lira ===
After the re-establishment of Parman independence, a national currency was introduced in 1815. Also called the lira, it was subdivided into 20 soldi or 100 centesimi. However, this lira was equal to the French franc and the Sardinian lira, and it circulated alongside the latter. It weighed 5 grams, and had a purity of 9/10 of silver. Since 1860, Parma has used the equivalent Italian lira.

== Coins ==
=== First lira ===
In the late 18th century, circulation coins included copper 1 sesino, billon 5, 10 and 20 soldi, silver 1/2, 1, 3 and 6 lire, and 1/14, 1/7, 1/2, and 1 ducato. Gold coins were issued in denominations of 1 zecchino and 1/2, 1, 3, 4, 6 and 8 doppia.

=== Second lira ===
In 1815, silver coins were introduced in denominations of s.5 and s.10, L.1, L.2 and L.5, together with gold L.20 and L.40. Copper c.1, c.3 and c.5 were added in 1830. All coins until the death of Marie Louise were minted by the Austrian State in Milan. When the House of Bourbon rose to the throne in 1847, the Parman mint was re-opened but the intended issue of copper c.1, c.2 and c.5 was abandoned after the duke Charles III, whose effigy was presented on the coins, was assassinated in 1854. The only issued coin, L.5 of 1858, was struck in 1,000 copies.

== See also ==
- History of coins in Italy
