= Cavallo (coin) =

Copper coin of Southern Italy

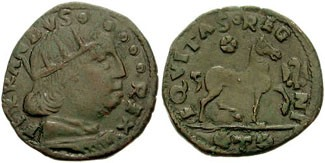
Cavallo of Ferdinand I of Naples.

The cavallo was a copper coin of Southern Italy in the Italian Renaissance. It was minted for the first time by King Ferdinand I of Naples in 1472. It gained its name from the figure of a horse on the reverse.

== History ==
The name later was used for coins of the same values but with different types such as that minted by Charles VIII of France at Naples in 1494. As its value decreased, the cavallo was abolished in 1498 and replaced with the doppio cavallo ("Double Cavallo"), also known as sestino, by Frederick I of Naples.

The cavallo was minted again shortly under Philip IV of Spain (the Kingdom of Naples at the time was ruled by Spain) in 1626. Multiples (2, 3, 4, 6 and 9 cavalli) were minted until Ferdinand IV.

The last coin of three cavalli was minted in 1804, being replaced by the tornese, equal to 6 cavalli.

== See also ==
- History of coins in Italy
