= Tuscan florin =

fiorino (Italian)
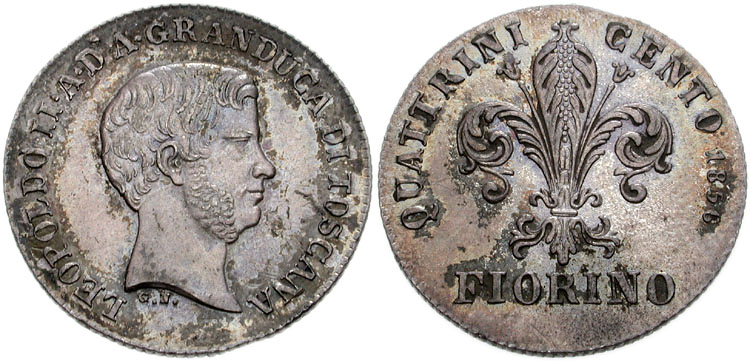
- One fiorino by Leopold II

Unit
- Symbol: ƒ

Denominations
- Subunit
- 1/100: quattrino
- Coins: q.1, q.3, q.5, q.10, q.20, p.1 ƒ1, ƒ2, ƒ4
- Rarely used: ƒ1/4, ƒ1/2, ƒ20, ƒ60, ƒ80

Demographics
- Official user(s): Tuscany
- Unofficial user: United Provinces of Central Italy

Issuance
- Mint: Florence Mint
- This infobox shows the latest status before this currency was rendered obsolete.

The Tuscan fiorino (plural: fiorini) was the currency of Tuscany between 1826 and 1859. It was subdivided into 100 quattrini (singular: quattrino), a local currency made by four denari (from the Latin: quater denarii). There was an additional denomination called the paolo, worth 40 quattrini, in circulation.

== History ==
During the Napoleonic Wars, Tuscany was annexed by France and the French franc was introduced, together with its satellite Italian lira. The previous lira did not disappear, creating a big confusion between the old Tuscan lira and the new Italian lira. So, when Duke Leopold II rose to power in 1824, he decided to introduce a new basic currency. The fiorino replaced the Tuscan lira at a rate of 1 2/3 lire = 1 fiorino. In 1847, Tuscany absorbed Lucca and the fiorino replaced the Luccan lira at a rate of 1 fiorino = 2 lire. After a brief revolutionary coinage, the fiorino was replaced in 1859 by a provisional currency denominated in "Italian lira", equal to the Sardinian lira, with 1 fiorino = 1.4 Italian lire.

=== Coins ===
Copper coins were struck in denominations of 1 and 3 quattrini, together with billon 5 and 10 quattrini, silver 1/2, 1 and 5 paolo, 1/4, 1/2, 1 and 4 fiorini. Gold coins included the sequin (Italian: zecchino), ruspone and 80 fiorini, the latter two equalled 3 and 10 sequins respectively.

== See also ==
- History of coins in Italy
