= Augustalis =

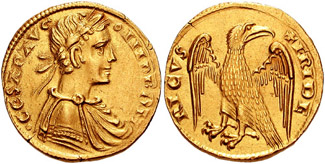
Example of a Messinese augustale, showing Frederick as a Roman Emperor

An augustalis or augustale, also agostaro, was a gold coin minted in the Kingdom of Sicily beginning in 1231.

== History ==
It was issued by Frederick II, Holy Roman Emperor (from 1220) and King of Sicily (from 1198), and was minted until his death in 1250. In addition, a half augustalis was issued. It was identical in design, but smaller and half the weight. The augustalis bore a Latin inscription and was widely circulated in Italy. It was patterned after the Roman aureus. It was struck at Naples starting from 1229, Brindisi and Messina starting from 1231, with accompanying billon deniers. The style of the augustalis has been described as splendid and proto-Renaissance; the quality of its execution and its fineness was high. The augustalis had a nominal weight of 5.31 grams and was 20 1/2 carats (854/1000) fine. The legal value was a quarter of a Sicilian gold ounce.

The obverse contains a classical (not medieval) profile bust of the emperor wearing a laureate wreath with the legend CESAR AVG IMP ROM (Caesar Augustus, Emperor of the Romans); the reverse shows an eagle, the imperial symbol, with the name FRIDE RICVS (Frederick). The name augustalis means literally "of the august one", referring to the coin's provenance from the emperor himself, but also linking it with the Roman Emperor, who was commonly styled Augustus.

It has recently been shown that the obverse shows the eagle, while the reverse features portraits of various Roman emperors. The order of the two is unmistakable, thanks to the text relating to the titles of Frederick II.

== See also ==
- History of coins in Italy
