= Genovino =

Gold coin produced by Republic of Genoa from 1252 to 1415

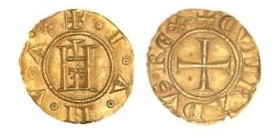
Genovino of the year 1252.

The genovino was a gold coin used in the Republic of Genoa from 1252 to 1415.

== History ==
New supplies of gold arrived in Western Europe from Sudan, via caravans from the Sahara, which allowed Florence and Genoa to inaugurate, from the 13th century, the minting of these currencies.

The genovino was issued in Genoa for the first time in 1252, shortly before the Florentine currency, and would be issued until 1415. The ottavino and quartarola (an eighth and a quarter of the genovino) were also struck.

The coin had a weight of 3.49 g (0.112 ozt) of 24 carats (i.e. pure gold) and its diameter was approximately 20 mm (0.79 in). On its obverse was the door of a castle, as was typical of medieval Genoese coins. Just like the earliest Genoese coins, on the genovino's rim was inscribed the Latin word IANUA meaning the god "Janus" or "door" (see Etymology of Genoa).

From 1339 when Simone Boccanegra became the first Doge of Genoa, the coin also contained the inscription X DVX IANVENSIVM PRIMVS.

== See also ==
- History of coins in Italy
