= Lombardo-Venetian florin =

Currency of Lombardy-Venita

The fiorino was the currency of Lombardy-Venetia (reduced to the sole Venetia three years before) between 1862 and 1866.

== History ==
It replaced the lira at a rate of 1 fiorino = 3 lire. The fiorino was equivalent to the Austro-Hungarian florin. Although it was subdivided into 100 soldi rather than 100 kreutzers, Austrian coins circulated in Venetia. The only coins issued specifically for Venetia were copper 1/2 and 1 soldo pieces. The name soldo was chosen due to the equivalence of the predecimal kreutzer and soldo, both worth 1/120 of a Conventionsthaler.

The fiorino was replaced by the Italian lira at the rate of 1 lira = 40 1/2 soldi (1 fiorino = 2.469 lire). This rate corresponded to the comparative silver contents of the lira and fiorino coins.

== See also ==
- History of coins in Italy
