= Luccan lira =

Former type of currency

lira (Italian)

Denominations
- Subunit
- 1/20: soldo
- 1/60: quattrino
- Coins: q.1, q.2, s.1, q.5, s.2, s.3, s.5, s.10, L1, L2

Demographics
- User(s): Lucca

Issuance
- Mint: Lucca Mint
- This infobox shows the latest status before this currency was rendered obsolete.

The lira (plural: lire) was the currency of the Republic of Lucca until 1800 and again of the Duchy of Lucca between 1826 and 1847. It was subdivided into 20 soldi, each of 3 quattrini or 12 denari.

== History ==
The lira circulated until 1800, when the French franc was introduced, accompanied by the Luccan franc from 1805. After Napoleon's fall, the Luccan State remained without an official currency, using both old francs and Tuscan lira and Tuscan fiorino. The Luccan lira reappeared in 1826 by order of Duke Charles Louis, replacing all circulating currencies. The Luccan lira contained less silver than the Tuscan lira had. Lucca was absorbed by Tuscany in 1847 and the Luccan lira was replaced by the Tuscan fiorino at a rate of 1 fiorino = 1 2/3 Tuscan lire = 2 Luccan lire.

== Coins ==
In 1826, coins were introduced in denominations of q.1, q.2 and q.5, 1, 2, 3, 5 and 10 soldi, and 1 and 2 lire. The quattrini denominations and the s.1 were struck in copper, with the higher denominations in silver.

== See also ==
- History of coins in Italy
