= Bolognino =

Medieval coin from Bologna, Italy

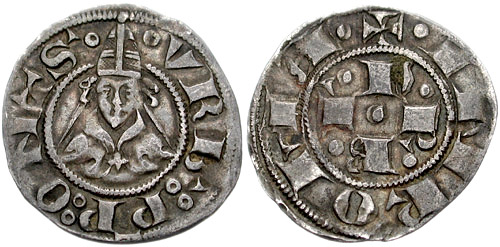
Bolognino of Pope Urban V (1362-1370).

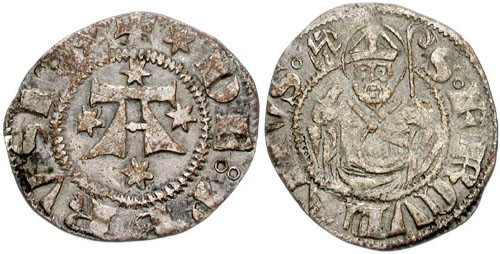
A bolognino struck in Republican Perugia (1395-1471).

The bolognino was a coin minted in Bologna and other cities of medieval Italy from the late 12th century to the 17th century.

== History ==
The coin originated in 1191, when emperor Henry VI granted the municipality of Bologna the right to mint a silver denaro. In 1236, this unit was rechristened bolognino piccolo (small bolognino), when the bolognino grosso (big bolognino) was introduced, with the value of a 12 soldi. It weighed 1.41 g of silver.

The grosso was adopted in other Italian communes and cities, such as Ravenna and Rimini, and copied by other mints, such as those of Lucca, Rome and other cities in Abruzzo and Marche. The value changed depending from the current political and economic situation. In the late 15th century Kingdom of Naples, for instance, the value of a bolognino was 18 silver denari. The initial imperial dedication was later replaced by that to Bolognese ruling families, such as the Pepoli and the Visconti. In the 16th century, when the city fell under Papal control, it showed the papal bust and the city's coat of arms.

The bolognino was no longer struck starting from the 18th century. Multiples up to 100 bolognini continued to exist, however.

A golden bolognino, introduced in 1380, had the value of 30 silver bolognini, same title and weight of the Papal ducato.

== See also ==
- History of coins in Italy
