= Two Sicilies ducat =

Currency of the Kingdom of Two Sicilies

Ducato (Italian)
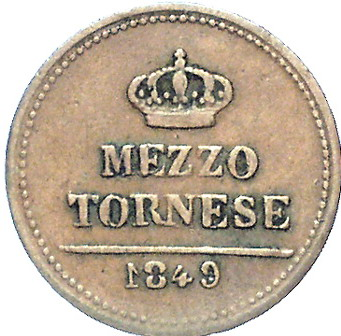
Half tornese
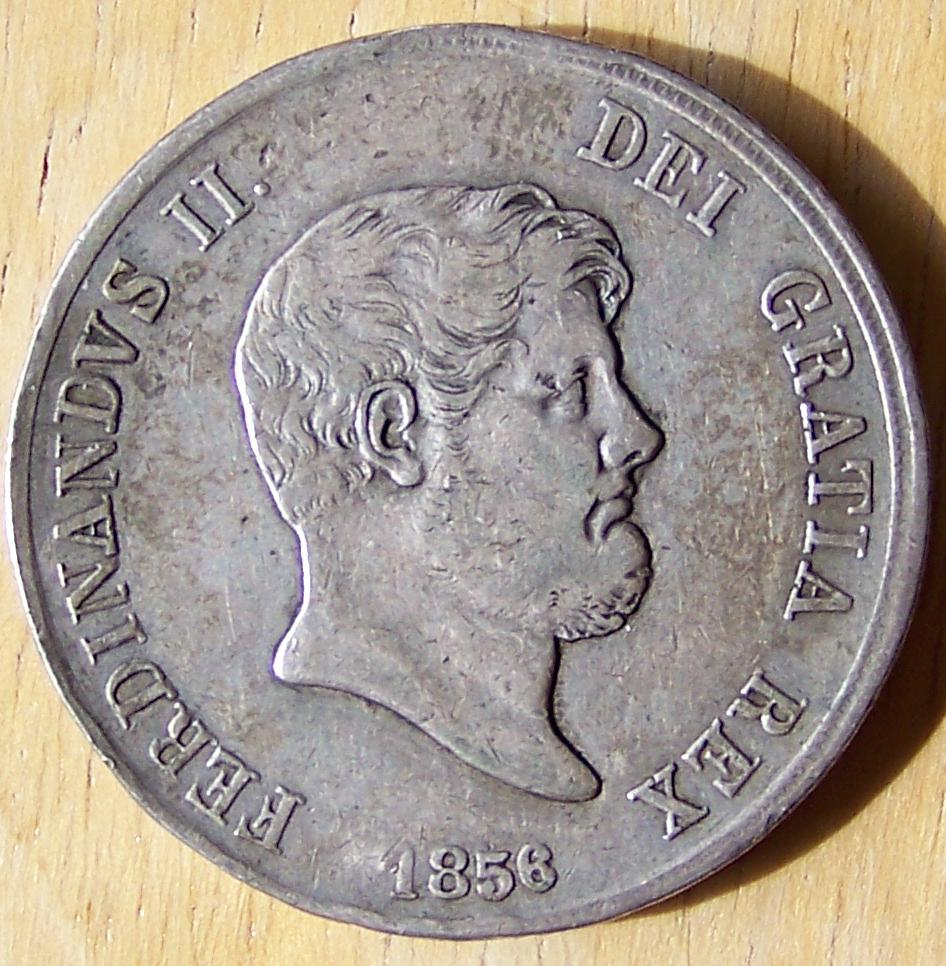
120 grana by Ferdinand II

Unit
- Plural: Y

Denominations
- Subunit
- 1/100: grana
- 1/200: tornesel
- Coins: 1/2, 1, 1 1/2, 2, 3, 5, 10 tornesels G.5, G.10, G.20, G.60, G.120
- Rarely used: D.3, D.6, D.15, D.30

Demographics
- Date of introduction: 1816
- Date of withdrawal: 1860
- User(s): Two Sicilies

Issuance
- Mint: Naples Mint; Palermo Mint
- This infobox shows the latest status before this currency was rendered obsolete.

The ducat was the main currency of the Kingdom of the Two Sicilies between 1816 and 1860. When the Congress of Vienna created the kingdom merging the Kingdom of Naples and the Kingdom of Sicily, the ducat became at par a continuation of the Neapolitan ducat and the Sicilian piastra issued prior to 1816, although the Sicilian piastra had been subdivided into 240 grana. In the mainland part of the kingdom, the ducat also replaced the Napoleonic lira.

== History ==
The subdivision and the coinage of the currency were simplified with respect to the pre-Napoleonic era: only three denominations survived. The ducat proper was the name of the gold coins, and curiously it did not exist as a single unit; the grana (singular: grano) was the name of the silver coins, itself also not existing as a single unit; the tornesel (Italian: tornese) was the name of the copper coins, which were worth half a grana. Accounts were kept in ducats, each of 100 grana or 200 tornesels.

The piastra was the unofficial name of the biggest silver coin, which had a value of 120 grana. When the Italian lira replaced the coinage of the House of Bourbon in 1861, a rate of 1 piastra = 5.1 lire was established.

== Coins ==
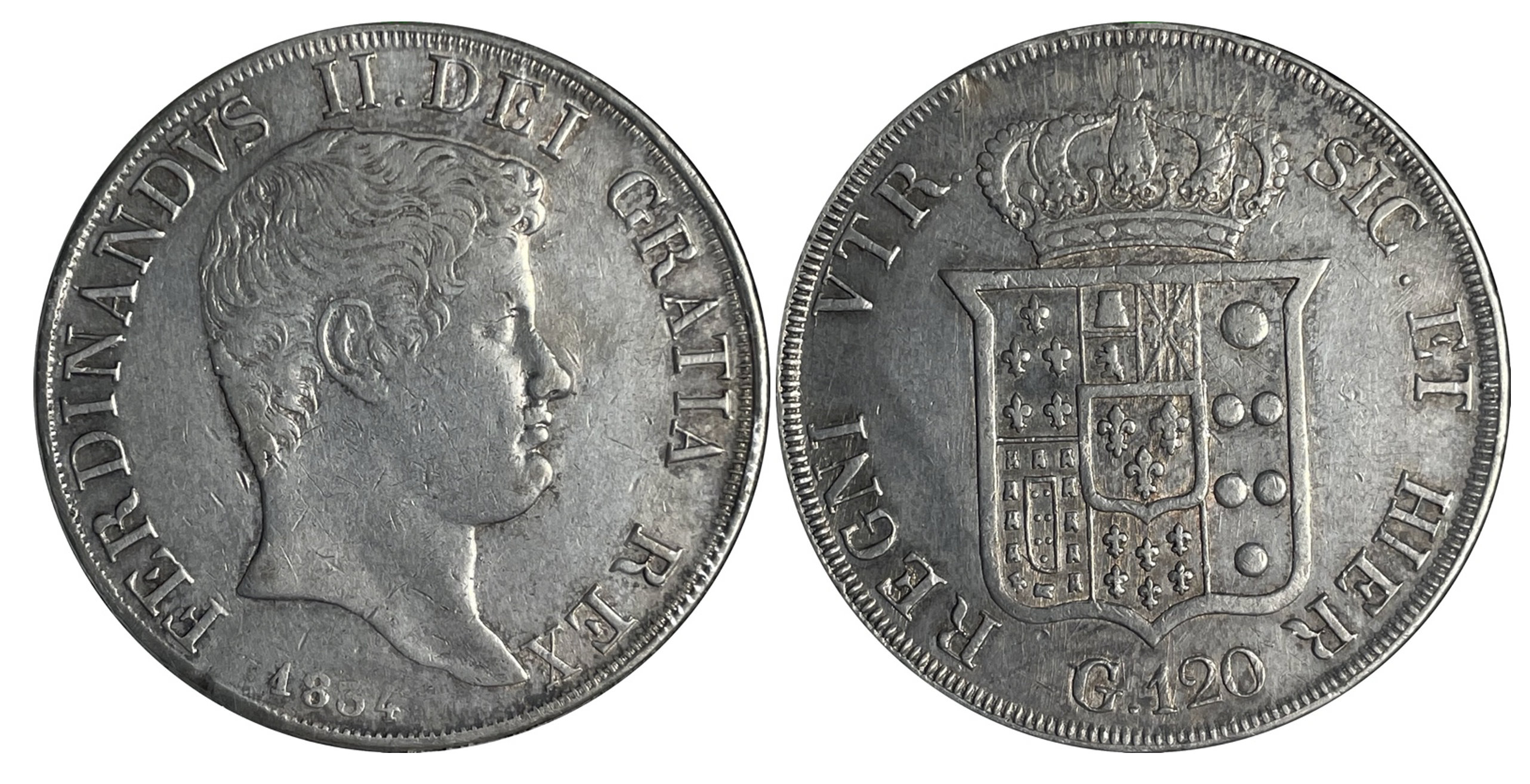
Silver coin: 120 grana Ferdinando II - 1834

Copper coins were issued in denominations of 1/2, 1, 1 1/2, 2, 3, 4, 5, 8 and 10 tornesels, together with silver 5, 10, 20, 60 and 120 grana coins, the largest being unofficially called piastra. Gold coins were issued for 3, 6, 15 and 30 ducats.

== See also ==
- History of coins in Italy
