= Milanese scudo =

The scudo was the currency of Milan until 1806. It was subdivided into 6 lire, each of 20 soldi or 240 denari.

== History ==
The Milanese scudo and lira were then replaced in 1806 by the Italian lira of the Napoleonic Kingdom of Italy. Its exchange rate of 27 Milanese lire = 4.5 Milanese scudi = 20.723 Italian lire (each of 4.5 g fine silver) implied a fine silver content of 20.723 g for the scudo.

From 1814 to 1866, however, this new currency was supplanted by the Lombardo-Venetian lira of the Austro-Hungarian Empire, which was based on the Austrian Conventionsthaler. Use of this currency ended only after the Kingdom of Lombardy–Venetia was dissolved in 1866, in favor of solely the Italian lira.

== Coins ==
In the late 18th century, silver coins circulated in denominations of 5 soldi, ½, 1 and 1½ lire, ½ and 1 scudo. Gold coins were also struck in denominations of 1 zecchino, ½ and 1 sovrano, and 1 doppia. The Cispadane Republic issued gold 20 lire coins, whilst the Cisalpine Republic issued silver 30 soldi and 1 scudo coins.

== See also ==
- History of coins in Italy
