= Neapolitan lira =

Currency of the Kingdom of Naples

The lira was the currency of the mainland part of the Kingdom of the Two Sicilies, known as the Kingdom of Naples, between 1812 and 1813.

== History ==
The currency was issued by Joachim Murat, who claimed the title of "King of the Two Sicilies" but only controlled the mainland part of the kingdom. Consequently, the currency is referred to as the "Neapolitan lira". It was subdivided into 100 centesimi (singular: centesimo) and was equal to the Italian lira and French franc. It replaced the piastra, which circulated again following the restoration of Bourbon rule.

== Coins ==
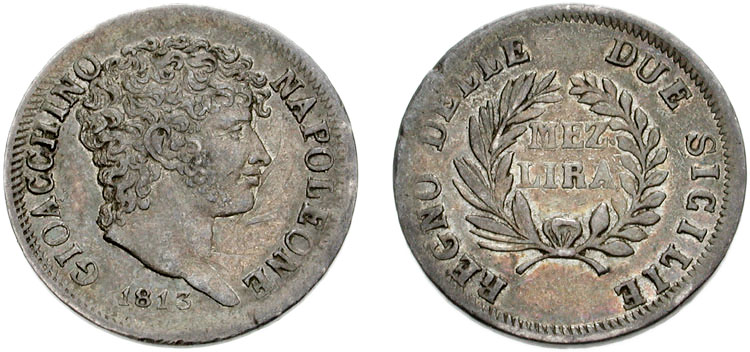
Neapolitan ½ lira coin
Head right; 1813 in exergue. GIOACCHINO NAPOLEONE	MEZ/LIRA in wreath. REGNO DELLE DUE SICILIE

Coins were issued in denominations of 3, 5 and 10 centesimi, ½, 1, 2, 5, 20 and 40 lire. The centesimi denominations were struck in bronze, the lire coins up to 5 lire were in silver and the higher denominations were in gold. All the coins bore the head of name Joachim Murat and his adopted Italian name, "Gioacchino Napoleone".

== See also ==
- History of coins in Italy
