= Sardinian scudo =

The scudo (plural: scudi) was the currency of the island Kingdom of Sardinia until 1816.

== History ==
It was subdivided into 2½ lire (singular: lira), each of 4 reales, 20 soldi, 120 cagliarese or 240 denari. The doppietta was worth 2 scudi. It was replaced by the Sardinian lira.

== Coins ==
In the late 18th century, coins circulated in denominations of 1 and 3 cagliarese, 1 soldo, ½ and 1 reale, ¼, ½ and 1 scudo, 1, 2½ and 5 doppietta. The cagliarese denominations were struck in copper, the soldo and reale in billon, the scudo in silver and the doppietta in gold.

== See also ==
- History of coins in Italy
