= Neapolitan piastra =

Currency of the Kingdom of Naples

The piastra was the most common silver coin of the mainland Kingdom of Sicily, also known as the Kingdom of Naples.

== History ==
In order to distinguish it from the piastra issued on the island of Sicily, it is referred to as the "Neapolitan piastra" as opposed to the "Sicilian piastra". These two piastra were equal, but were subdivided differently. The Neapolitan piastra was divided into 120 grana (singular: grano), each of 2 tornesi (singular: tornese) or 12 cavalli (singular: cavallo). There were also the carlino worth 10 grana and the ducato worth 100 grana.

In 1812, the Neapolitan lira was introduced by the occupying French in an attempt to decimalize the Neapolitan currency units. However, the attempt failed, and the decimalization was limited to changing the value of the cavallo to one tenth of a grano. After the restoration of Bourbon control, a single currency was issued for the whole of the Two Sicilies, the Two Sicilies piastra. This new piastra was subdivided in the same way as the Neapolitan piastra.

== Coins ==
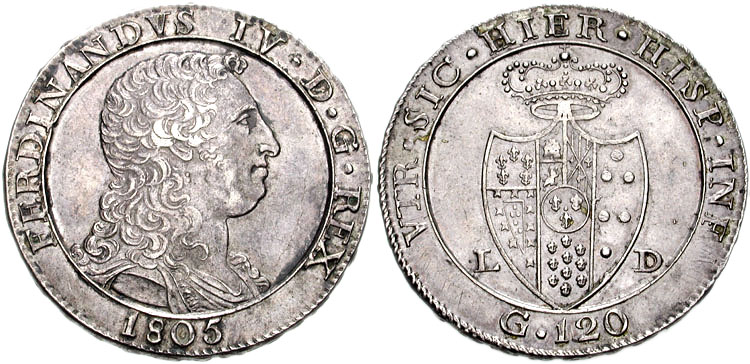
Neapolitan 120 grana (1 piastra) coin of Ferdinand IV.

In the late 18th century, coins circulated in denominations of 3, 4, 6, 9 and 12 cavalli, 3, 5, 8 and 10 tornesi, 10 (carlino), 20 (tarì), 60 (mezza piastra) and 120 grana (piastra) and 2, 3 and 6 ducati. On occasion also a 50 and 100 grana silver pieces had been struck, but not in the 18th century. The cavalli and tornesi denominations were struck in copper, with the grana denominations up to the piastra struck in silver and the higher denominations in gold.

In 1799, the short-lived Neapolitan Republic issued copper 4 and 6 tornesi, and silver 6 and 12 carlini. The restored kingdom resumed coin production, issuing many of the earlier denominations, plus copper 4 and 6 tornesi. In 1810, a gold 40 franchi coin was issued, a prelude to the introduction of the lira three years later.

== See also ==
- History of coins in Italy
