= Oncia =

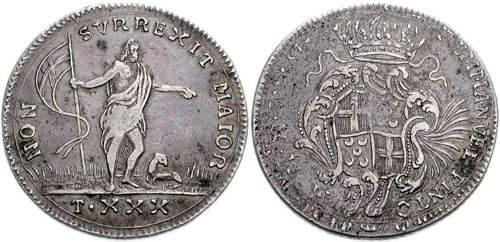
A silver Maltese oncia from 1741–73

In southern Italy, the oncia (plural oncie or once) or onza (pl. onze) was a unit of account during the Middle Ages and later a gold coin minted between 1732 and 1860. It was also minted in the southern Italian territories of the Spanish Empire, and a silver coin of the same value was minted by the Knights of Malta. The name is derived from the ancient Roman uncia. It is sometimes translated as ounce.

In the medieval kingdoms of Naples and Sicily, one oncia was equivalent to 30 tarì, 600 grani and 3600 denari (pennies). Conventionally, a sum of money is indicated by numbers of oncie, tarì, grani and denari separated by full stops, thus 2.2.15.1 indicates 2 oncie, two tarì, 15 grani and 1 denaro. Although the oncia was never minted in the Middle Ages, it was the basic unit of account. The lesser denominations were minted, as was the ducat (six of which equalled an oncia) and the carlino (60 to the oncia). Frederick II introduced the augustalis, which was a quarter of an oncia.

== See also ==
- History of coins in Italy
