= History of coins in Italy =

Italy has a long history of different coinage types, which spans thousands of years. Italy has been influential at a coinage point of view: the medieval Florentine florin, one of the most used coinage types in European history and one of the most important coins in Western history, was struck in Florence in the 13th century, while the Venetian sequin, minted from 1284 to 1797, was the most prestigious gold coin in circulation in the commercial centers of the Mediterranean Sea.

Despite the fact that the first Italian coinage systems were used in the Magna Graecia and Etruscan civilization, the Romans introduced a widespread currency throughout Italy. Unlike most modern coins, Roman coins had intrinsic value. The early modern Italian coins were very similar in style to French francs, especially in decimals, since it was ruled by the country in the Napoleonic Kingdom of Italy. They corresponded to a value of 0.29 grams of gold or 4.5 grams of silver.

Since Italy has been for centuries divided into many historic states, they all had different coinage systems, but when the country became unified in 1861, the Italian lira came into place, and was used until 2002. The term originates from libra, the largest unit of the Carolingian monetary system used in Western Europe and elsewhere from the 8th to the 20th century. In 1999, the euro became Italy's unit of account and the lira became a national subunit of the euro at a rate of 1 euro = 1,936.27 lire, before being replaced as cash in 2002.

== Antiquity ==
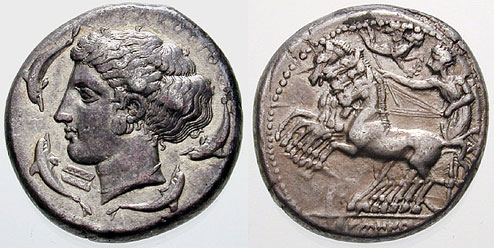
A Magna Graecia tetradrachm, c. 415–405 BC

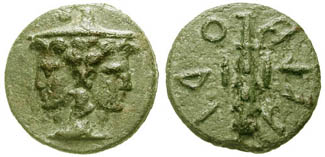
Etruscan coin, 3rd century BC

Despite the fact that the first Italian coinage systems were used in the Magna Graecia and Etruscan civilization, the Romans introduced a widespread currency throughout Italy. Unlike most modern coins, Roman coins had intrinsic value.

Greek coinage of Italy and Sicily originated from local Italiotes and Siceliotes who formed numerous city-states in Magna Graecia. These Hellenistic communities descended from Greek migrants. Southern Italy was so thoroughly hellenized that it was known as the Magna Graecia. Each of the polities struck their own coinage. Taras (now called Taranto) was among the most active of all Magna Graecia, which minted mainly in silver but often also in gold. By the second century BC some of these Greek coinages evolved under Roman rule, and can be classified as the first Roman provincial currencies.

The brief period of Etruscan coinage, with the predominance of marks of value, seems to be an amalgam that reconciles two very different monetary systems: the 'primitive' bronze-weighing and aes grave economy of central Italy with that of struck silver and gold issues of southern Italian Greek type not familiar in Etruria.

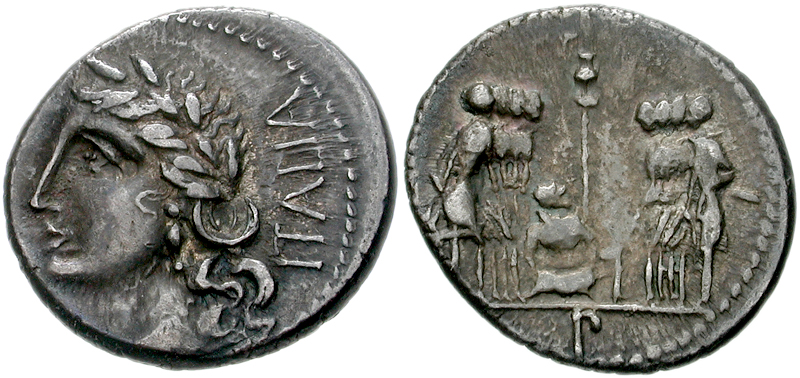
Silver coin minted in Corfinium during the Social War (91–87 BC), displaying the inscription ITALIA on the verge of the personification of Italy, represented as a goddess with laurel wreath

The family of Social War coinage includes all the coins issued by the Italic allies of the Marsic confederation, Marsi, Peligni, Piceni, Vestini, Samnites, Frentani, Marrucini, and Lucani, during the Social War (91–88 BC) against Rome. Inspired by the Roman denarius, their circulation (and perhaps their release) continued even after the conflict ended, contemporary and promiscuously with their republican models.

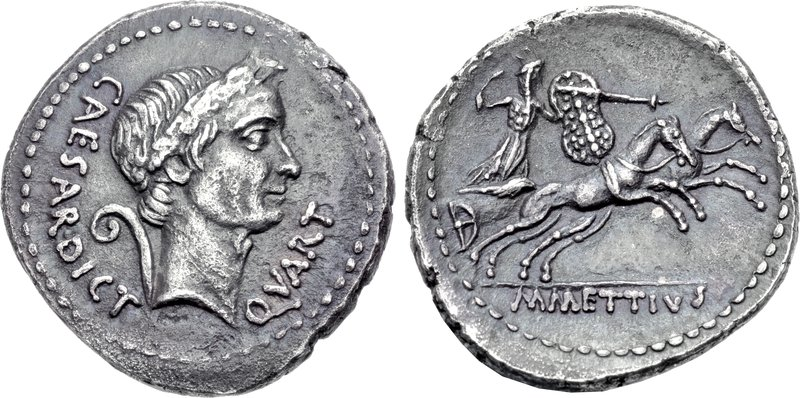
Roman denarius of Julius Caesar, 44 BC

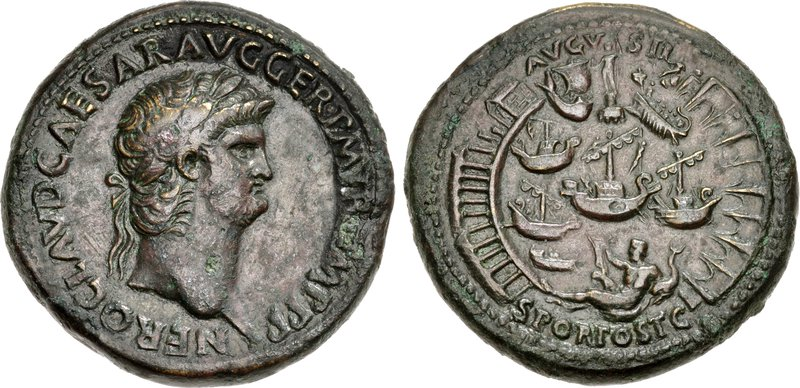
Roman sestertius of Nero, c. 54–68 AD

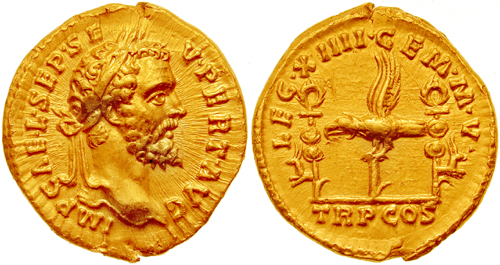
Roman aureus of Septimius Severus, c. 193–211 AD

Roman currency for most of Roman history consisted of gold, silver, bronze, orichalcum and copper coinage. From its introduction during the Republic, in the third century BC, through Imperial times, Roman currency saw many changes in form, denomination, and composition. A persistent feature was the inflationary debasement and replacement of coins over the centuries. Notable examples of this followed the reforms of Diocletian. This trend continued with Byzantine currency.

After the fall of the Western Roman Empire, the solidus continued to circulate for some time among the Franks; his name was kept and transformed into "sol" in French, then "sou". The peoples settled in the Empire, Burgundians, Ostrogoths and Visigoths, also issued coins imitating the Roman system, including the solidus. Roman currency names survive today in many countries via the Carolingian monetary system, such as the Arabic dinar (from the denarius coin), the British pound, the peso (both translations of the Roman libra, a unit of weight), and Portuguese dinheiro (from the denarius coin).

The manufacture of coins in the Roman culture, dating from about the 4th century BC, significantly influenced later development of coin minting in Europe. The origin of the word "mint" is ascribed to the manufacture of silver coin at Rome in 269 BC near the temple of Juno Moneta. This goddess became the personification of money, and her name was applied both to money and to its place of manufacture. Roman mints were spread widely across the Empire, and were sometimes used for propaganda purposes. The populace often learned of a new Roman Emperor when coins appeared with the new emperor's portrait.

While they contained precious metals, the value of a coin was higher than its precious metal content, so they were not bullion. Estimates of their value range from 1.6 to 2.85 times their metal content, thought to equal the purchasing power of 10 modern British Pound Sterling (US$15) at the beginning of the Roman Empire to around 18 Pound Sterling (US$29) by its end (comparing bread, wine and meat prices) and, over the same period, around one to three days' pay for a Legionnaire.

== Middle Ages and Renaissance ==
Italy has been influential at a coinage point of view: the medieval Florentine florin, one of the most used coinage types in European history and one of the most important coins in Western history, was struck in Florence in the 13th century, while the Venetian sequin, minted from 1284 to 1797, was the most prestigious gold coin in circulation in the commercial centers of the Mediterranean Sea.

=== Lombard coinage ===
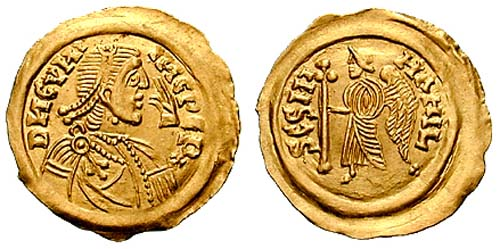
Lombard coin, c. 688–700 AD

The Lombard coinage refers to the autonomous productions of coins by the Lombards. It constitutes part of the coinage produced by Germanic peoples occupying the former territory of the Roman Empire during the Migration Period. All known Lombard coinage was produced after their settlement of Italy. The coinage originates from two distinct areas, in Langobardia Major between the last decades of the sixth century and 774, and in Langobardia Minor, in the duchy of Benevento, between approximately 680 and the end of the 9th century.

Only five hoards have been found which contain non-pseudo-imperial coinage of the Lombards. Of these, only two have been published in any detail.

- A hoard found at Ossi, Sardinia was described by Vincenzo Dessì in 1908.
- A hoard found at Ilanz, Grisons was described by Fritz Jecklin in 1906, and was further studied by Bernareggi in 1977.

=== Florentine florin ===
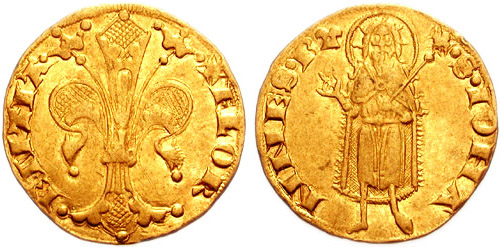
Florentine florin, 1347

The Florentine florin (Italian: Fiorino fiorentino) was struck from 1252 to 1523 with no significant change in its design or metal content standard. It had 54 grains (3.499 grams, 0.113 troy ounce) of nominally pure or 'fine' gold with a purchasing power difficult to estimate (and variable) but ranging according to social grouping and perspective from approximately 140 to 1,000 modern US dollars. The name of the coin comes from the Giglio bottonato (it), the floral emblem of the city, which is represented at the head of the coin.

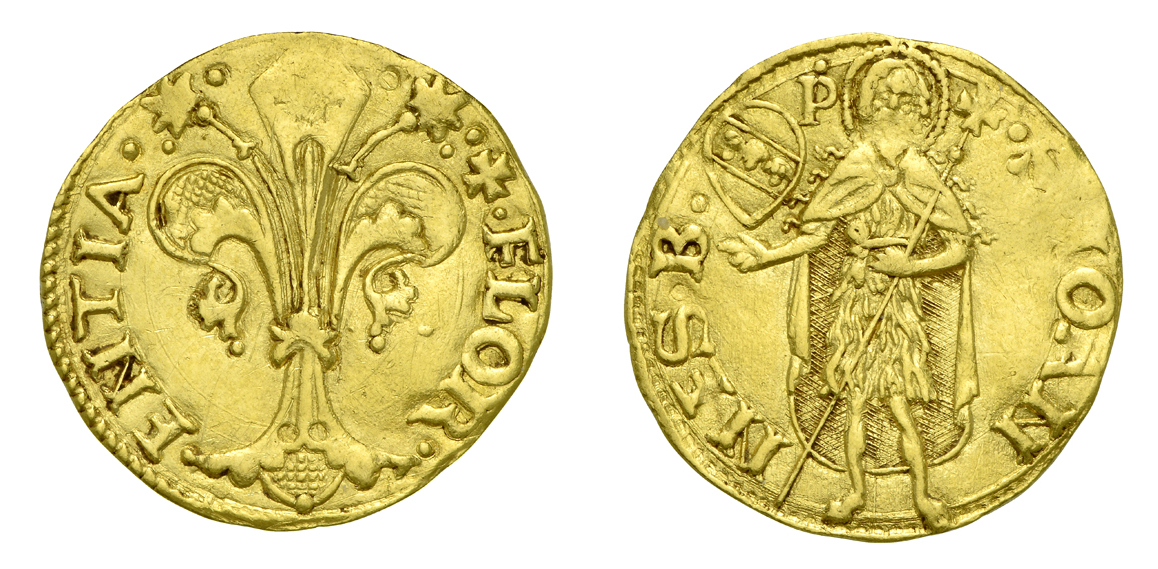
Florentine florin, 1507

The fiorino d'oro (gold florin) was used in the Republic of Florence and was the first European gold coin struck in sufficient quantities since the 7th century to play a significant commercial role. The florin was recognised across large parts of Europe. The territorial usage of the lira and the florin often overlapped, where the lira was used for smaller transactions (wages, food purchases), the florin was for larger transactions such as those used in dowries, international trade or for tax-related matters.

The Florentine florin is of the most used coinage types in European history and one of the most important coins in Western history. The first minting of the florin occurred in 1252, at the time the value of the florin was equal to the lira, but by 1500 the florin had appreciated, seven lire amounted to one florin. The design of the original Florentine florins was the distinctive fleur-de-lis badge of the city on one side and on the other a standing and facing figure of St. John the Baptist wearing a cilice. The Dutch guilder is symbolized as Fl. or ƒ, which means florijn (florin). The Hungarian forint is named after the florin.

=== Venetian sequin ===
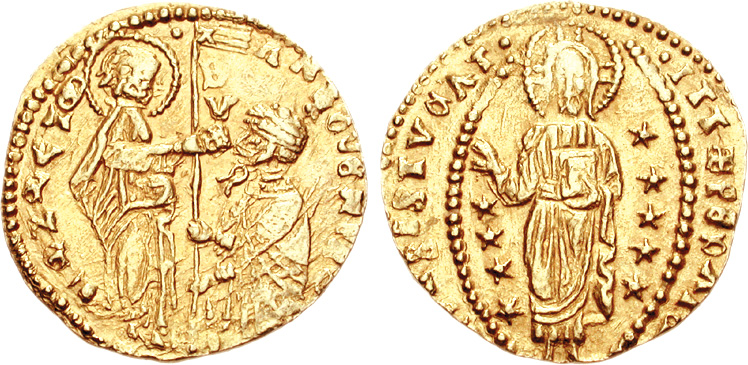
Venetian sequin, 1382

The sequin (Venetian and Italian: zecchino [dzekˈkiːno]) is a gold coin minted by the Republic of Venice from the 13th century onwards. The design of the Venetian sequin remained unchanged for over 500 years, from its introduction in 1284 to the fall of the Republic of Venice in 1797, making it the most prestigious gold coin in circulation in the commercial centers of the Mediterranean Sea. No other coin design has ever been produced over such a long historical period.

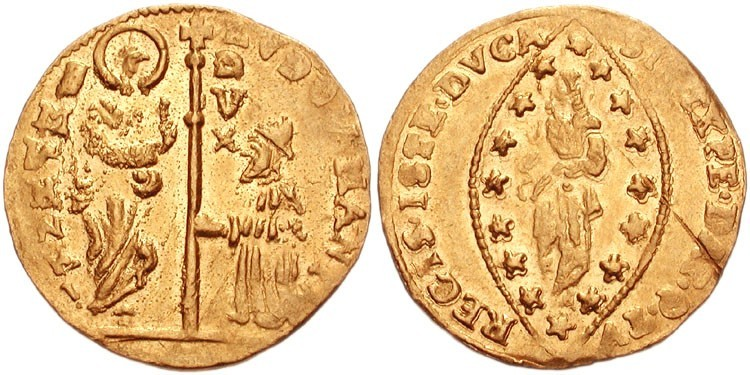
Venetian sequin, c. 1789–1797

The reverse bears a motto in Latin hexameter: Sit tibi, Christe, datus // quem tū regis, iste ducātus ("Christ, let this duchy that you rule be given to you"). On the obverse there is Mark the Evangelist, patron saint of Venice, who is depicted with a beard and halo, is facing to the right and is wrapped in a large cloak while holding the Gospel with his left hand. With his right hand the saint offers a banner to the Doge of Venice who is kneeling to the left and holding the staff with both hands. The Doge wears a rich fur-trimmed cloak and the ducal cap, under the flag facing to the right the vertical writing "dux", around it "s·m·venet" and the name of the Doge.

The quality of the minting is superior to all contemporary coins and this shows that the artists of the Venice Mint had already reached a high level of taste and refinement of design at the time. Initially called "ducat" (ducato), for the ruling Doge of Venice who was prominently depicted on it, it was called the zecchino, after the Zecca (mint) of Venice, since 1543 when Venice began minting a silver coin also called a ducat.

=== Venetian grosso ===
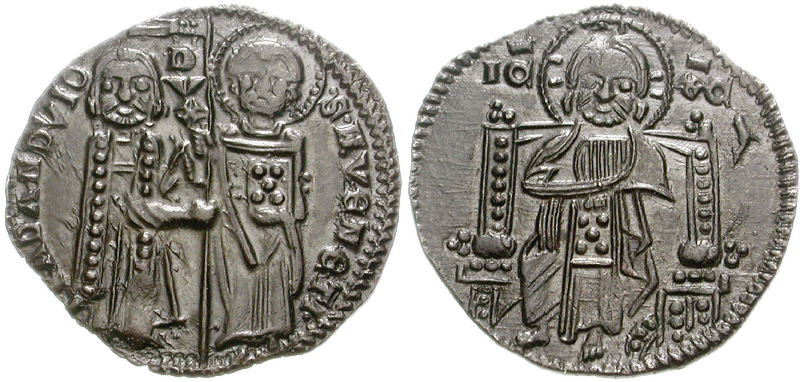
Venetian grosso, c. 1328–1339

The Venetian grosso (plural grossi) is a silver coin first introduced in the Republic of Venice in 1193 under doge Enrico Dandolo. It originally weighed 2.18 grams, was composed of 98.5% pure silver, and was valued at 26 denarii. Its name is from the same root as groschen and the English groat, all deriving ultimately from the denaro grosso ("large penny"). Its value was allowed to float relative to other Venetian coins until it was pegged to 4 soldini in 1332, incidentally the year the soldino was introduced. In 1332, 1 grosso was the equivalent of 4 soldini, or 48 denarii.

The earliest surviving account of Enrico Dandolo's introduction of the Venetian grosso associates it with the outfitting of the Fourth Crusade in 1202 and tradition makes the need to pay for the ships which transported the crusaders the cause of the grosso's introduction. Even though coinage of the grosso might have begun a few years earlier, the influx of silver used to pay for the crusaders' ships led to its first large scale mintage. The coin had 2.2 grams of 98.5% fine silver, the purest medieval metallurgy could make. It was initially called a ducatus argenti since Venice was a duchy, but is more widely known as a grosso or matapano, a Muslim term referring to the seated figure on its reverse.

=== Venetian lira ===
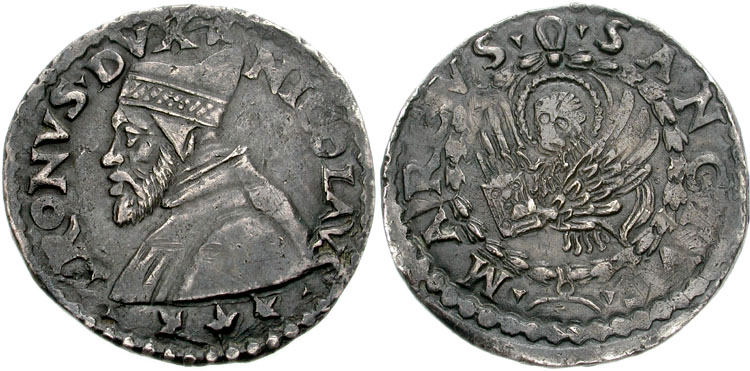
Venetian lira, c. 1471–1473

The Venetian lira (plural lire) was the distinct currency of the Republic of Venice until 1848, when it was replaced by the Italian lira. It originated from the Carolingian monetary system used in much of Western Europe since the 8th century CE, with the lira subdivided into 20 soldi, each of 12 denari.

From its initial value of 305.94 g fine silver, the Venetian lira had depreciated so much in value over its 1,000-year lifetime that this original unit was referred to from 1200 CE as the lira piccola (small lira) in comparison to larger units of the same name. The denaro or piccolo worth 1/240th a lira was the only coin produced between 800–1200 CE. Initially weighing 1.7 g fine silver, it depreciated over the centuries until it contained only 0.08 g fine silver by 1200 CE.

The various currency systems of Italy became of less importance to European trade after the Age of Discovery in the 16th century; nonetheless Venice continued to issue new coins. The scudo d'argento of 30.1 g fine silver was introduced in 1578 for 7 lire, rising to 12.4 lire by 1739. The tollero of 23.4 g fine silver was issued in 1797 for 10 lire.

The Venetian lira piccola was supplanted in the 19th century by the Italian lira of the Napoleonic Kingdom of Italy in 1806 and the Lombardy-Venetian lira of the Austrian Empire. The Italian lira was reintroduced by the Republic of San Marco in 1848 at par with the French franc, which finally replaced all previous currencies as well as the lira piccola, with the latter valued at 0.5116 Italian lira.

=== Genoese lira ===
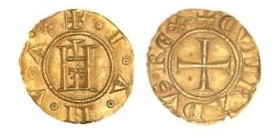
Genoese genovino, 1252

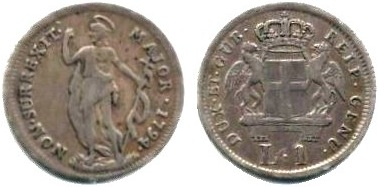
Genoese lira, 1794

The Genoese lira (Italian: Lira genovese) was the currency of the Republic of Genoa until 1797. The mint in the Republic of Genoa began its production around 1138, with coins introduced in line with similar versions issued in the rest of Europe, as follows:

- The silver denaro in 1138, containing 1.06 grams of 1/3 fine silver (or 84.8 g fine silver in a lira);
- The silver grosso in 1172 worth 4 denari, of 1.4 g of 23/24 fine silver (or 80.5 g fine silver in a lira);
- The gold Genovino d'oro in 1252, at about the same time as the Florentine florin; of 3.5 g fine gold, and worth 1/2 lira (each lira worth either 7 g fine gold or 70 g fine silver);
- The testone or 1-lira coin before 1500, containing about 13 g of 23/24 fine silver (or 12.5g fine). It was the highest-valued Italian coin unit in the end of the 15th century.

Genoese currency became important in the 16th century during the Golden age of Genoese banking, with the Spanish Empire funnelling its massive wealth from Spanish America through the Bank of Saint George. With the decline in the fortunes of the Genoese banks and the Spanish Empire in the 17th century, however, the Genoese lira also depreciated substantially. The silver scudo's value increased to 6.5 lire in 1646, 7.4 lire in 1671, and 8.74 lire just before the Austrian occupation of Genoa in 1746.

=== Papal States florin ===
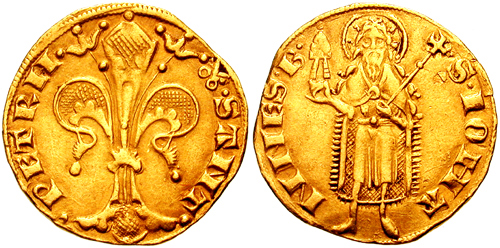
Papal States florin with Pope Urban V depicted, c. 1362–1370

The Byzantine monetary system is followed in the papal coinage until the reign of Pope Leo III, after which the system of the Frankish Empire obtains. Pope John XXII adopted the Florentine system, and coined gold florins, but the weight of this coin varied from 22 to 30 carats (4.4 to 6 g), until Pope Gregory XI reduced it to the original 24 carats (4.8 g); but deterioration came again, and then there were two kinds of florins, the papal florin, which maintained the old weight, and the florin di Camera, the two being in the ratio of 69 papal florins = 100 florins di Camera = 1 gold pound = 10 carlini. The ducat was coined in the papal mint from the year 1432; it was a coin of Venetian origin that circulated with the florin, which in 1531 was succeeded by the scudo, a piece of French origin (écu) that remained the monetary unit of the Pontifical States.

=== Papal States Giulio ===
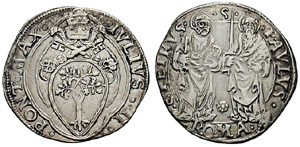
Papal States Giulio with Pope Julius II depicted, 1503

The Giulio was a papal coin with a value of 2 grossi. The name came from Pope Julius II (r. 1503–13) who had increased it in weight and intrinsic in 1504. By order of 20 July 1504 the Pope established: "Reformetur stampae monetariae pro ducatis, carlenis, bononiensis etc. Cogitetur de cunio monetae si posset reduci Urbs ad monetam papalem exclusa forensi etc.". The carleni (or carlini) were then reformed and changed their name to giuli, so as to distinguish them from the previous ones. They contained an abundant 4 grams of silver. Their value thus became one third higher than the pontifical carlino. A few years later, in 1508, the silver content had already fallen below 4 grams. In 1535 there was a further reduction to 3.65 grams. The first minting of Julius II bore the papal arms on the obverse and the saints Peter and Paul on the reverse.

In 1540 Paul III coined the coins with 3.85 grams of fine which took the name of paoli. The name of giulio was also used by other papal mints and some Italian ones. The papal giulio of Bologna was forged in Masserano by a Fieschi before 1597. This coin weighed only 3.4 grams.

The last coin minted with this name was the silver giulio struck by Pius VII in 1817; it weighed 2,642 g and had a title of 917/1000. It was still worth 2 grossi or 10 baiocchi. The names of paolo and giulio were in use in Rome, even when these coins were no longer in circulation, to indicate the 20 baiocchi coin.

=== Papal States Paolo ===
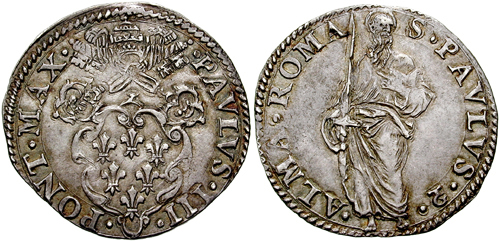
Papal States Paolo with Pope Paul III depicted, 1540

The Paolo or Paulo was a pontifical coin; this name was given to the giulio by 2 grossi when in 1540 Pope Paul III (hence its name) made it increase its silver content to 3.85 g. The first minting of Paul III bore the papal arms on the obverse and St. Paul on the reverse.

At the time of the arrival of the French Revolutionaries, a paolo was valued on the Milanese market with the value of 14 soldi. In Rome in the nineteenth century it was the popular name of the 10 baiocchi coin. The names of paolo and giulio remained in use in Rome until the pontificate of Pius IX, even when these coins were no longer in circulation, to indicate the 10 baiocchi coin. The same name took coins from other Italian states. In the Grand Duchy of Tuscany circulated the paolo of 8 crazie.

=== Lazian baiocco ===
Lazian baiocco, 1667

The baiocco is an ancient Italian currency denomination largely used in Central Italy, especially in Latium. The origin of the name is uncertain. Its value was originally equivalent to a shilling, slowly changing through centuries into five quattrini, or consequently twenty pennies. The size, weight and value of the coin itself changed over time. At a certain point, towards the middle of the 16th Century, it became so thin that it deserved the nickname "Baiocchino" or "Baiocchétto" because it actually weighed less than 0.25g.

It underwent numerous other variations of material losing more and more silver and becoming more and more low alloy, so much so that it was indicated with the derogatory "Baiocchella" during the period of Sixtus V from 1585 to 1590. It disappeared after the unification of Italy between 1861 and 1870, when the Italian lira was introduced

=== Neapolitan cavallo ===
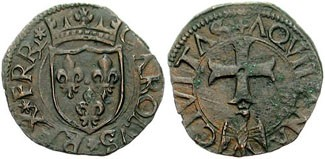
Neapolitan cavallo, c. 1495–1496

The cavallo was a copper coin of southern Italy in the Renaissance. It was minted for the first time by King Ferdinand I of Naples in 1472. It gained its name from the figure of a horse on the reverse.

The name later was used for coins of the same values but with different types such as that minted by Charles VIII of France at Naples in 1494. As its value decreased, the cavallo was abolished in 1498 and replaced with the doppio cavallo ("Double Cavallo"), also known as sestino, by Frederick I of Naples.

The cavallo was minted again shortly under Philip IV of Spain (the Kingdom of Naples at the time was ruled by Spain) in 1626. Multiples (2, 3, 4, 6 and 9 cavalli) were minted until Ferdinand IV. The last coin of three cavalli was minted in 1804, being replaced by the tornese, equal to 6 cavalli.

=== Anconetan agontano ===
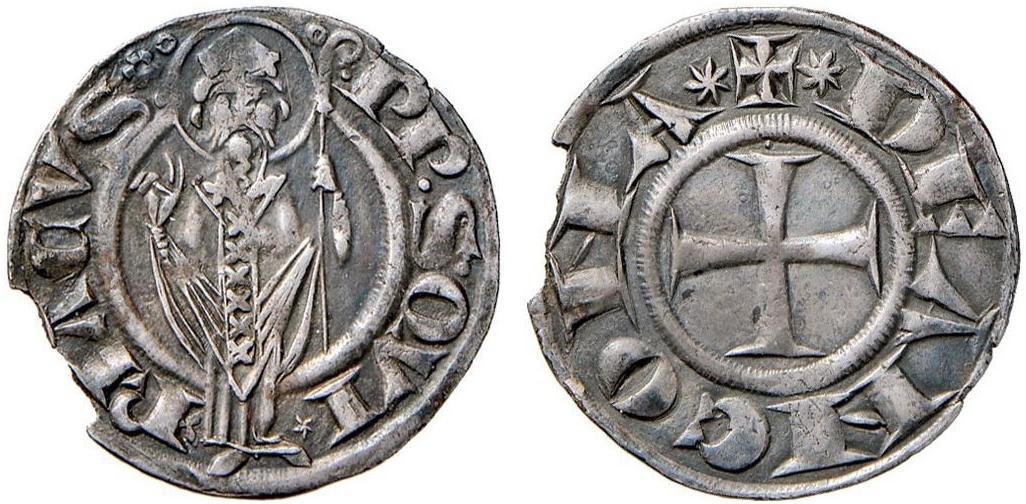
Ancona agontano, c. 13th–14th centuries

The agontano was the currency used by the Italian Maritime Republic of Ancona from the 12th to the 16th centuries during its golden age. It was a large silver coin of 18-22mm in diameter and a weight of 2.04–2.42 grams, of roughly equivalent value to the Milanese Soldo. The first reports of Ancona's medieval coinage begin in the 12th century when the independence of the city grew and it began to mint coinage without Imperial or papal oversight.

The coin, also called "Grosso Agontano", was a great success and its type was imitated in other cities of Marche and also in Emilia-Romagna, Tuscany, Lazio and Abruzzo. For example, coins of Massa Marittima, Ravenna, Rimini, Volterra, Pesaro and Ferrara. show a marked influence from Ancona.

=== Milanese soldo ===
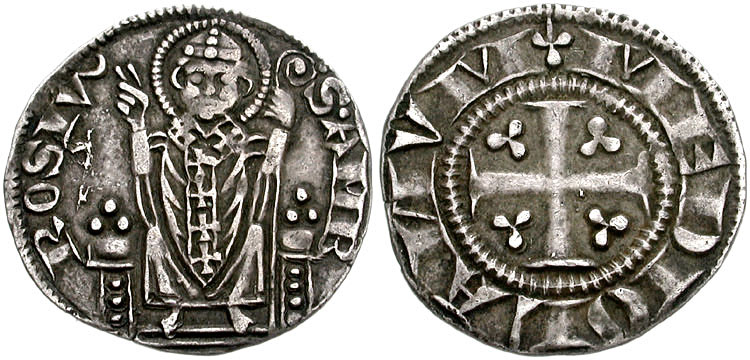
Milanese soldo, c. 1250–1310

The soldo was an Italian medieval silver coin, issued for the first time in the late 12th century at Milan by Emperor Henry VI. The name derives from the late Roman coin solidus.

It quickly became widespread in Italy, where it was coined in Genoa, Bologna, and numerous other cities. In Venice, the soldo was minted from the reign of Francesco Dandolo onward, remaining in use also after the republic's dissolution in 1797 and during the Austrian occupation, until 1862. In the 14th century Florence, a soldo equaled 1/20 of a lira and 12 denari.

=== Neapolitan gigliato ===
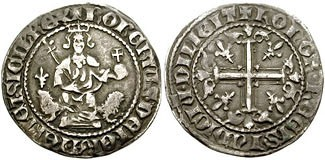
Neapolitan gigliato, 1310

The gigliato, also gillat or carlino, was a coin of pure silver established in 1303 by Charles II of Anjou in Naples, and then also in Provence from 1330. Its name derives from the Lilies ("giglio") depicted on the reverse entwined around a cross. The coin weighed 4 grams. This type of coin was widely copied in the Eastern Mediterranean, especially by the Turks, such as the Emir of Saruhan.

Charles II of Anjou's silver gigliato was the same diameter as the dominant silver coin of its time, the French gros tournois, or as the grosso rinforzato being struck by the Roman Senate, i.e. 24 m.m.. It contained 4.01 grams of .929 fine silver, or 3.73 grams of pure silver. Its types were more typical of French gold coins, especially Philip the Fair's petit royal d’or, than Italian silver coins.

=== Bolognese bolognino ===
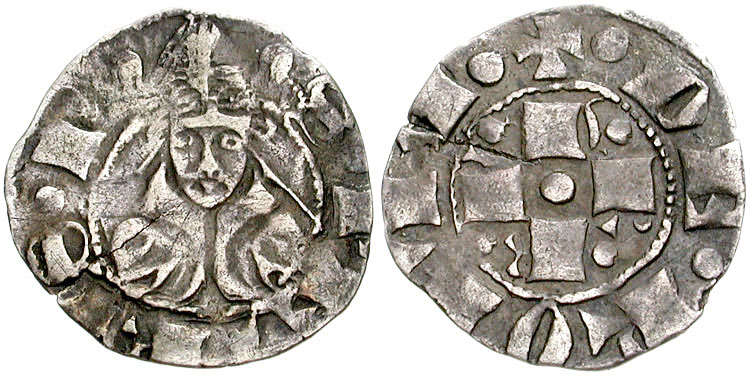
Bolognese bolognino, c. 1370-1378

The Bolognino was a coin minted in Bologna and other cities of medieval Italy from the late 12th century to the 17th century.

The coin originated in 1191, when emperor Henry VI granted Bologna the right to mint a silver denaro. In 1236 this unit was rechristened Bolognino piccolo (Small Bolognino) when the Bolognino grosso (Big Bolognino) was introduced, with the value of a 12 soldi. It weighed 9 carats.

The grosso was adopted in other Italian communes and cities, such as Ravenna and Rimini and copied by other mints, such as those of Lucca, Rome and other cities in Abruzzo and Marche. The value changed depending from the current political and economic situation.

The bolognino was no longer struck starting from the 18th century. Multiples up to 100 bolognini continued to exist, however.

A golden bolognino, introduced in 1380, had the value of 30 silver bolognini (same title and weight of the Papal ducato.

=== Sicilian pierreale ===
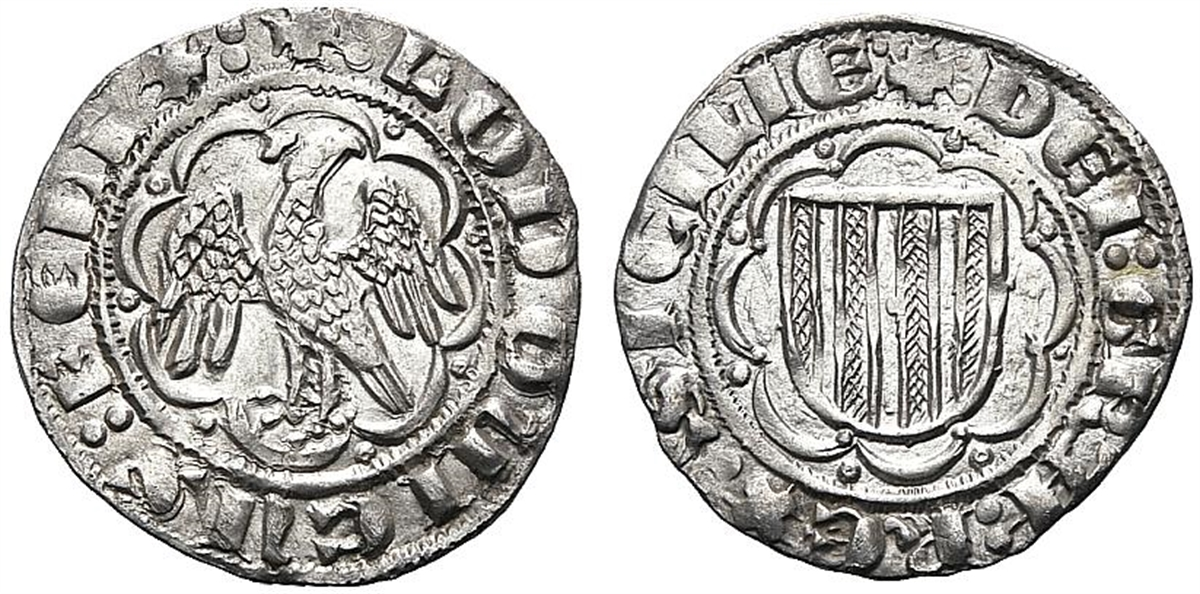
Sicilian pierreale, c. 1342–1355

The pierreale (plural pierreali, i.e. "reale of Peter") was a silver coin minted by the Kingdom of Sicily between the reigns of Peter I (1282–1285) and Ferdinand II (1479–1516). It was equivalent in weight and fineness to the Neapolitan carlino and was sometimes called a carlino.

It carried on the obverse the imperial eagle, the favoured emblem of the Staufer dynasty of Peter I's queen, Constance II, and on the reverse the arms of Aragon, representing Peter's native kingdom. The design deliberately contrasted with that of the carlino. After Alfonso I's conquest of Naples in 1442, he replaced the arms with an image of the seated ruler (in imitation of the carlino) and replaced the eagle with the quartered arms of Aragon and Naples.

Gold pierreali equivalent to ten silver ones were minted under Peter I, but only rarely thereafter. Half-pierreali and quarter-pierreali were minted between 1377 and 1410 and again during the reign of John (1458–1479).

=== Sicilian augustalis ===
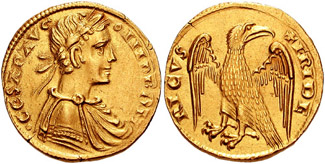
Sicilian augustalis, c. 1231–1250

An augustalis or augustale, also agostaro, was a gold coin minted in the Kingdom of Sicily beginning in 1231. It was issued by Frederick II, Holy Roman Emperor (from 1220) and King of Sicily (from 1198), and was minted until his death in 1250. In addition, a half augustalis was issued. It was identical in design, but smaller and half the weight. The name augustalis means literally "of the august one", referring to the coin's provenance from the emperor himself, but also linking it with the Roman Emperor, who was commonly styled Augustus.

The augustalis bore a Latin inscription and was widely circulated in Italy. It was patterned after the Roman aureus. It was struck at Brindisi and Messina with accompanying billon deniers. The style of the augustalis has been described as splendid and proto-Renaissance; the quality of its execution and its fineness was high. The augustalis had a nominal weight of 5.31 grams and was 20 1/2 carats (854/1000) fine. The legal value was a quarter of a Sicilian gold ounce.

== Modern era ==
The early modern Italian coins were very similar in style to French francs, especially in decimals, since it was ruled by the country in the Napoleonic Kingdom of Italy. They corresponded to a value of 0.29 grams of gold or 4.5 grams of silver.

=== Papal States scudo ===
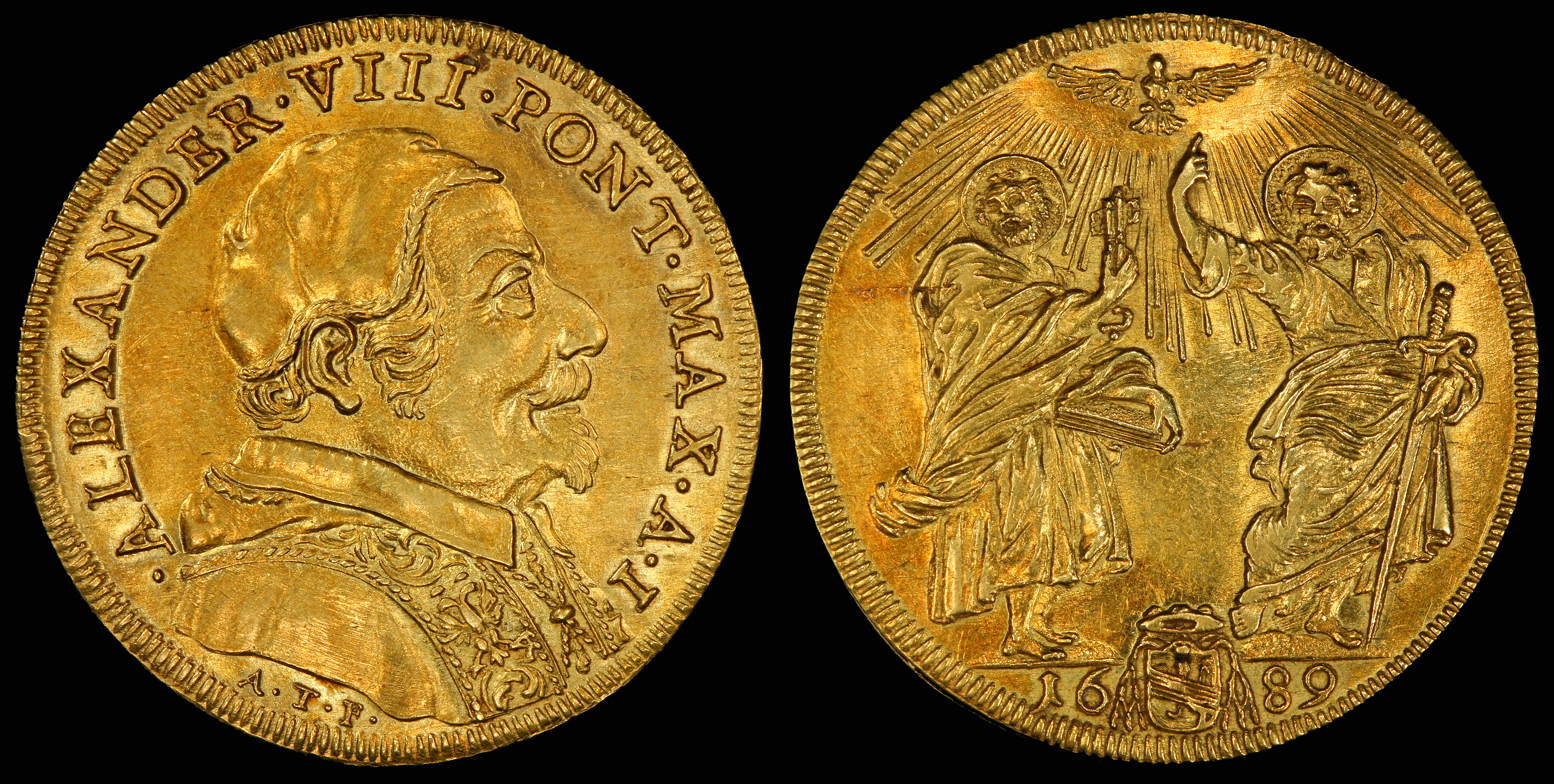
Papal States 4 (Papal States scudo) depicting Pope Alexander VIII (obv) and Saints Peter and Paul (rev), 1689

The Papal States scudo (plural: scudi) was the coinage system used in the Papal States until 1866. It was subdivided into 100 baiocchi (singular: baiocco), each of 5 quattrini (singular: quattrino). Other denominations included the grosso of 5 baiocchi, the carlino of 7 1/2 baiocchi, the giulio and paoli both of 10 baiocchi, the testone of 30 baiocchi and the doppia of 3 scudi.

Between 1798 and 1799, the revolutionary French forces established the Roman Republic, which issued coins denominated in baiocco and scudo. In addition, the states of Ancona, Civitavecchia, Clitunno, Foligno, Gubbio, Pergola and Perugia changed their coinage system to that of the Roman Republic. The popes entrusted the production of the coining to the best artists of the time.

In 1808, the Papal States were annexed by France, and French francs circulated as the official coins. When the Pope's authority was restored in 1814, the scudo was restored as the currency. However, the coinage of the individual states was not resumed. In 1849, another Roman Republic was established which issued coins centrally and in Ancona.

In 1866, the scudo was replaced by the lira, equivalent to the Italian lira. The exchange rate used was 5.375 lire = 1 scudo.

=== Parman lira ===
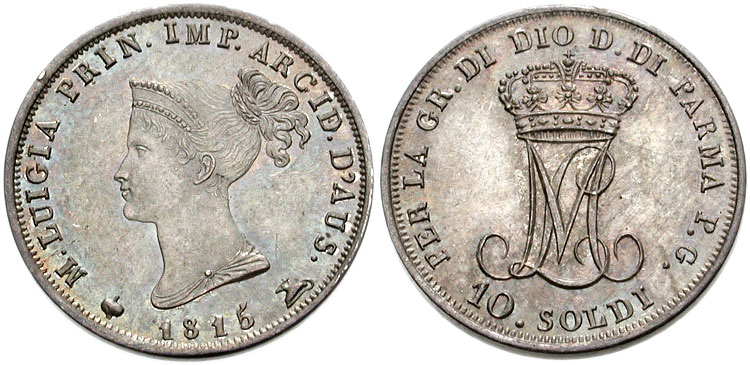
Half Parman lira, 1815

The Parman lira was Parma's official currency before 1802, and later revived from 1815 to 1859. The Duchy of Parma had its own coinage system until it was made a part of France in 1802. This lira was subdivided into 20 soldi (singular: soldo), each of 12 denari (singular: denaro), with the sesino worth 6 denari and the ducato was worth 7 lire. The currency was replaced by the French franc.

After the re-establishment of Parman independence, the Parman currency system was introduced in 1815. Also called the lira, it was subdivided into 20 soldi or 100 centesimi. However, this lira was equal to the French franc and the Sardinian lira, and it circulated alongside the latter. It weighed 5 grams, and had a purity of 9/10 of silver. Since 1861, Parma has used the equivalent Italian lira.

=== Sardinian scudo ===
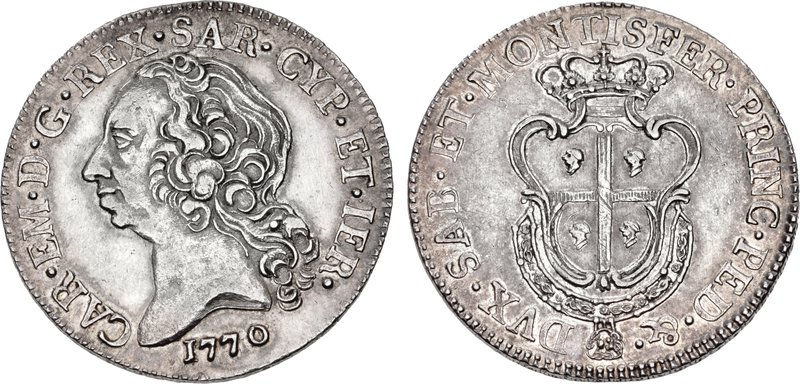
Half Sardinian scudo, 1770

The Sardinian scudo (plural: scudi) was the currency of the Kingdom of Sardinia from 1720 to 1816. It was subdivided into 2½ lire (singular: lira), each of 4 reales, 20 soldi, 120 cagliarese or 240 denari. The doppietta was worth 2 scudi. It was replaced by the Sardinian lira.

In the late 18th century, coins circulated in denominations of 1 and 3 cagliarese, 1 soldo, ½ and 1 reale, ¼, ½ and 1 scudo, 1, 2½ and 5 doppietta. The cagliarese denominations were struck in copper, the soldo and reale in billon, the scudo in silver and the doppietta in gold.

=== Two Sicilies oncia ===
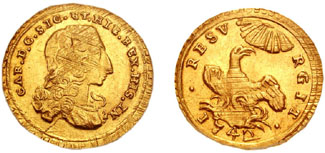
Sicilian oncia, 1742

In southern Italy, the oncia (plural oncie or once) or onza (pl. onze) was a unit of account during the Middle Ages and later a gold coin minted between 1732 and 1860. It was also minted in the southern Italian territories of the Spanish Empire, and a silver coin of the same value was minted by the Knights of Malta. The name is derived from the ancient Roman uncia. It may sometimes be translated ounce.

In the medieval kingdoms of Naples and Sicily, one oncia was equivalent to 30 tarì, 600 grani and 3600 denari (pennies). Conventionally, a sum of money is indicated by numbers of oncie, tarì, grani and denari separated by full stops, thus 2.2.15.1 indicates 2 oncie, two tarì, 15 grani and 1 denaro. Although the oncia was never minted in the Middle Ages, it was the basic unit of account. The lesser denominations were minted, as was the ducat (six of which equalled an oncia) and the carlino (60 to the oncia). Frederick II introduced the augustalis, which was a quarter of an oncia.

=== Two Sicilies tornese ===
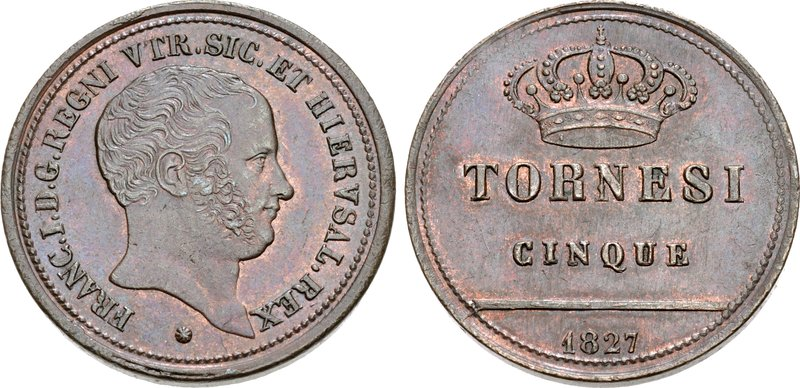
Two Sicilies 5 tornese, 1827

The tornese, or tornesol, was a silver coin of Europe in the Late Middle Ages and the early modern era. It took its name from the denier tournois, the denier of Tours.

Marco Polo referred to the tornesel in recounts of his travels to East Asia when describing the currencies of the Yuan Empire.

His descriptions were based on the conversion of 1 bezant = 20 groats = 133 1/3 tornesel. The tornese was a subunit of the Neapolitan, Sicilian, and Two Sicilies ducats.

=== Luccan lira ===
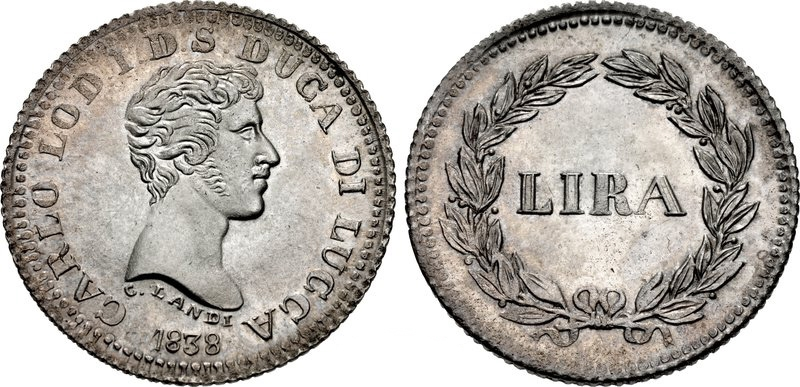
Luccan lira, 1838

The Luccan lira (plural: lire) was the currency of the Republic of Lucca until 1800 and again of the Duchy of Lucca between 1826 and 1847. It was subdivided into 20 soldi, each of 3 quattrini or 12 denari. The lira circulated until 1800, when the French franc was introduced, accompanied by the Luccan franc from 1805. After Napoleon's fall, the Luccan State remained without an official currency, using both old francs and Tuscan lira and Tuscan fiorino. The Luccan lira reappeared in 1826 by order of Duke Charles Louis, replacing all circulating currencies.

The Luccan lira contained less silver than the Tuscan lira had. Lucca was absorbed by Tuscany in 1847 and the Luccan lira was replaced by the Tuscan fiorino at a rate of 1 fiorino = 1 2/3 Tuscan lire = 2 Luccan lire. In 1826, coins were introduced in denominations of q.1, q.2 and q.5, 1, 2, 3, 5 and 10 soldi, and 1 and 2 lire. The quattrini denominations and the s.1 were struck in copper, with the higher denominations in silver.

=== Piedmontese scudo ===
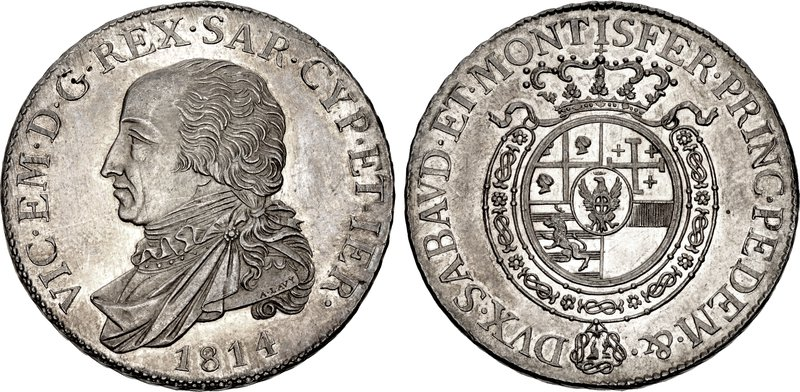
Piedmontese scudo, 1814

The Piedmontese scudo (plural: scudi) was the currency of the Piedmont and the other mainland parts of the Savoyard Kingdom of Sardinia from 1755 to 1816. It was subdivided into 6 lire (singular: lira), each of 20 soldi or 240 denari. The doppia was worth 2 scudi. During the Subalpine Republic and French occupation (1800–1814), the French franc circulated, supplemented by a small number of locally produced coins. The scudo was replaced by the Sardinian lira.

In the late 18th century, copper 2 denari, billon ½, 1, 2½ and 7½ soldi, silver ¼, ½ and 1 scudo, and gold ¼, ½, 1, and 2½ doppia coins circulated. In the 1790s, copper 1 and 5 soldi, and billon 10, 15 and 20 soldi were added. The Piedmont Republic issued silver ¼ and ½ scudo in 1799. This was followed in 1800 by bronze 2 soldi struck in the name of the "Piedmont Nation" (Nazione Piemontese).

=== Tuscan lira ===
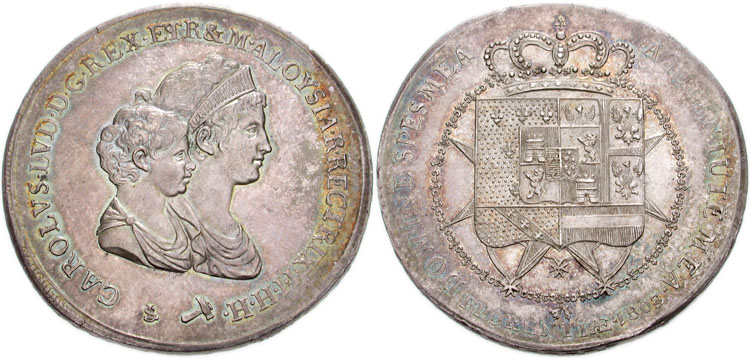
10 Tuscan lire, 1803

The Tuscan lira (plural: lire) was the currency of the Grand Duchy of Tuscany until its annexation by Napoleonic France in 1807. After that year, it unofficially remained in circulation thanks to its silver value until the restoration of Tuscan independence in 1814. It was finally abolished in 1826. It was subdivided into 20 soldi, each of 3 quattrini or 12 denari (singular: soldo, quattrino, denaro). Other denominations included the crazia worth q.5; the grosso worth q.20; the paolo worth q.40 or 2/3 lira; the testone worth 3 paoli; and the crown-sized francescone worth 10 paoli or 6 2/3 lire.

In 1803 the Tuscan lira was equivalent to 0.84 French francs, 0.84 Italian lira, or 3.78 grams of fine silver. In 1826 it was replaced by the Tuscan fiorino worth 100 quattrini or 1 2/3 lira. In the late 18th century, copper coins circulated in denominations of q.1, q.2, and s.1, together with billon q.10 and silver 1/2, 1, 2, 5 and 10 paoli. In the early 19th century, copper s.1/2 and s.2 were added, together with silver 1 lira and 10 lire. The 10-lira coin was known as dena and the 5-lira coin was known as meza-dena ("half-dena").

=== Sicilian piastra ===
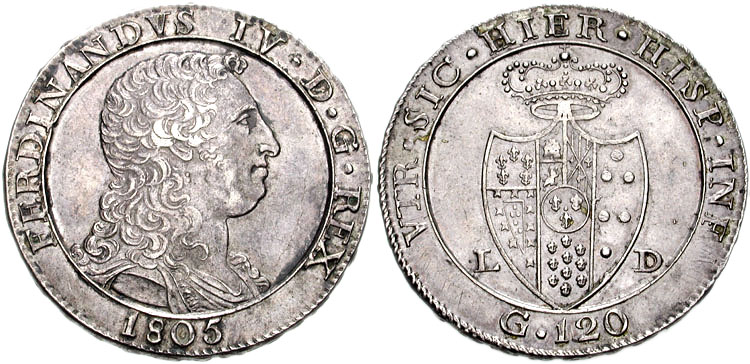
Sicilian piastra, 1805

The Sicilian piastra was the distinct currency of the Kingdom of Sicily until 1815. To distinguish it from the piastra issued on the mainland Kingdom of Sicily (also known as the Kingdom of Naples), it is referred to as the "Sicilian piastra" as opposed to the "Neapolitan piastra". These two piastra were equal, but were subdivided differently. The Sicilian piastra was subdivided into 12 tarì, each of 20 grana or 120 piccoli. The oncia was worth 30 tarì (2½ piastra).

In 1815, a single piastra currency was introduced for the Kingdom of the Two Sicilies, the Two Sicilies piastra. From a Riveli in 1607 Catania, also a Riveli in 1811 Avola, the Sicilian money system can be readily extracted. It was:-

1 onze = 30 Tari, 1 Taro = 20 Grani, 1 Grano = 6 piccioli.

On both of these historic documents, the denomination piastra was not used. A Sicilian coin commonly available for sale today is the 120 grana silver piece, weighing an ounce. It is called, in the supplementary description of this silver piece, one piastre. However, in 1823 George Crabb, in his Universal Technological Dictionary Volume 2, in addition to supporting the above relative values of onze, tari and grani in accounting, lists 120 grani as equivalent to one florino. Crabb also lists the ponto, the carlino, the ducat and the scudo or crown and their equivalence to the grano, however no mention of the piastre.

=== Neapolitan piastra ===
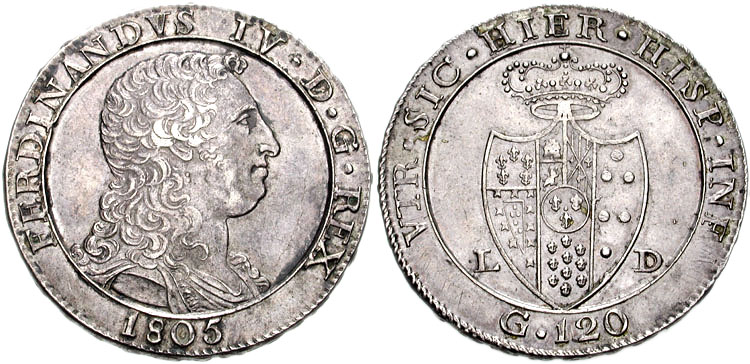
Neapolitan 120 grana (1 Neapolitan piastra) coin, 1805

The Neapolitan piastra was the most common silver coin of the Kingdom of Naples. To distinguish it from the piastra issued on the island of Sicily, it is referred to as the "Neapolitan piastra" as opposed to the "Sicilian piastra".

These two piastra were equal but were subdivided differently. The Neapolitan piastra was divided into 120 grana (singular: grano), each of 2 tornesi (singular: tornese) or 12 cavalli (singular: cavallo). There were also the carlino worth 10 grana and the ducato worth 100 grana.

In 1812, the Neapolitan lira was introduced by the occupying French in an attempt to decimalize the Neapolitan currency units. However, the attempt failed, and the decimalization was limited to changing the value of the cavallo to one tenth of a grano. After the restoration of Bourbon control, a single currency was issued for the whole of the Two Sicilies, the Two Sicilies piastra. This new piastra was subdivided in the same way as the Neapolitan piastra.

=== Two Sicilies piastra ===
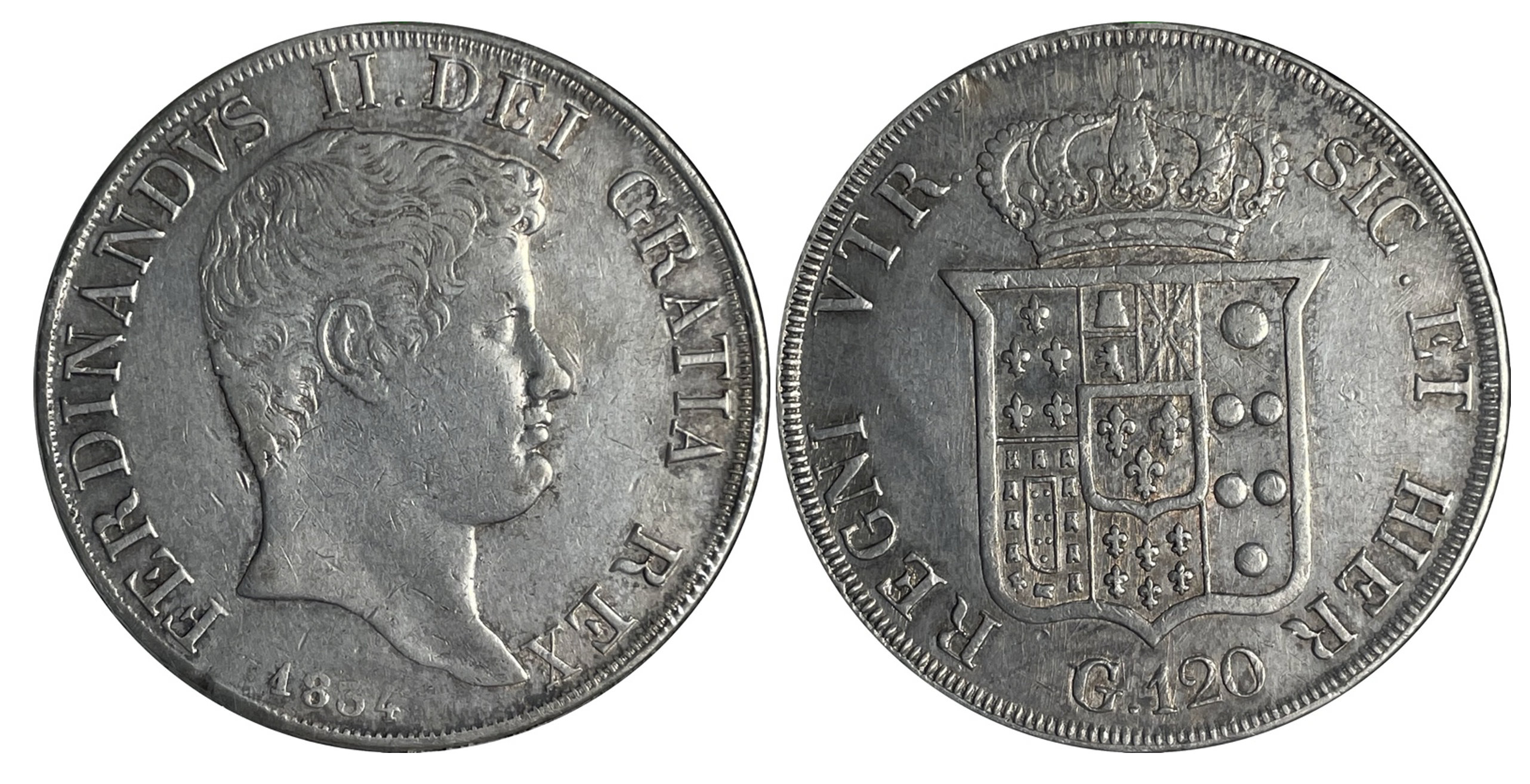
Silver Two Sicilies 120 grana (1 Two Sicilies piastra), 1834

The Two Sicilies piastra was the coinage system or currency of the Kingdom of the Two Sicilies between 1815 and 1860. It was subdivided into 120 grana (singular: grano), each of 2 tornesi (singular: tornese). Accounts were kept in ducato, worth 100 grana. The subdivision and the coinage of the currency were simplified with respect to the pre-Napoleonic era: only three denominations survived. The ducat proper was the name of the gold coins, and curiously it did not exist as a single unit; the grana (singular: grano) was the name of the silver coins, itself also not existing as a single unit; the tornesel (Italian: tornese) was the name of the copper coins, which were worth half a grana. Accounts were kept in ducats, each of 100 grana or 200 tornesels.

The piastra was the unofficial name of the biggest silver coin, which had a value of 120 grana. When the Italian lira replaced the coinage of the House of Bourbon in 1861, a rate of 1 piastra = 5.1 lire was established.

=== Neapolitan lira ===
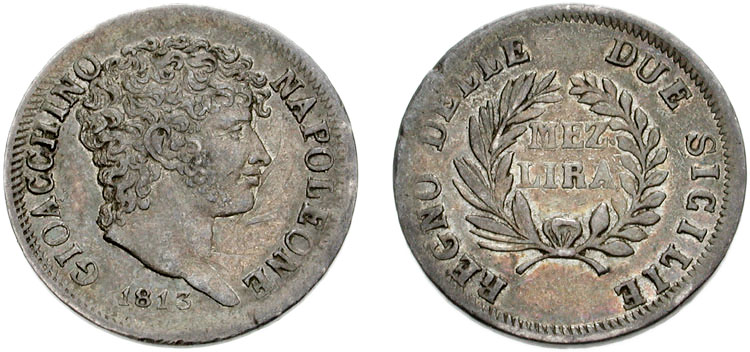
Neapolitan ½ lira, 1813

The Neapolitan lira was the currency of the mainland part of the Kingdom of the Two Sicilies, known as the Kingdom of Naples, between 1812 and 1815. The currency was issued by Joachim Murat, who claimed the title of "King of the Two Sicilies" but only controlled the mainland part of the kingdom. Consequently, the currency is referred to as the "Neapolitan lira". It was subdivided into 100 centesimi (singular: centesimo) and was equal to the Italian lira and French franc. It replaced the piastra, which circulated again following the restoration of Bourbon rule.

Coins were issued in denominations of 3, 5 and 10 centesimi, ½, 1, 2, 5, 20 and 40 lire. The centesimi denominations were struck in bronze, the lire coins up to 5 lire were in silver and the higher denominations were in gold. All the coins bore the head of name Joachim Murat and his adopted Italian name, "Gioacchino Napoleone".

=== Sardinian lira ===
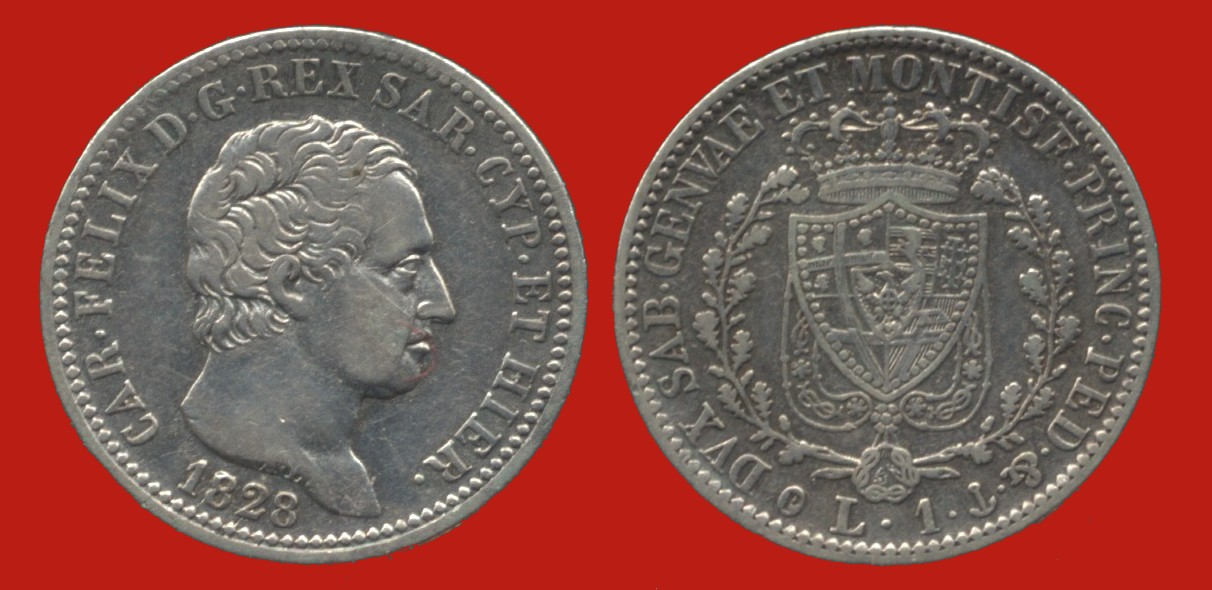
Sardinian lira, 1828

The Sardinian lira was the currency of the Kingdom of Sardinia between August 6, 1816, and March 17, 1861. It was subdivided into 100 centesimi (singular centesimo) and was equal in value to the French franc (4.5 grams of silver), which had previously been used as the currency of the Kingdom of Sardinia, having replaced the Piedmontese scudo by 1801.

Since the Sardinian lira was little more than another version of the French franc, it could circulate also in France, and the French coins could circulate in Piedmont (the mainland part of the Kingdom of Sardinia). The Sardinian lira was replaced at par by the Italian lira in 1861, as a consequence of the process of Italian unification. Similar to the majority of 19th century currencies, the Sardinian lira was not affected by significant episodes of inflation during all its existence.

On each coin, the ruling monarch was styled in Latin as King of Sardinia, Cyprus and Jerusalem by the Grace of God on the front side, and Duke of Savoy, Genoa and Montferrat, Prince of Piedmont et cetera on the back side.

=== Roman scudo ===
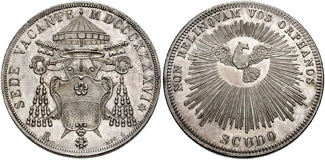
Roman scudo, 1846

The Roman scudo (plural: scudi romani) was the currency of the Papal States until from 1835 to 1866. It was subdivided into 100 baiocchi (singular: baiocco), each of 5 quattrini (singular: quattrino). Other denominations included the grosso of 5 baiocchi, the carlino of 7 1/2 baiocchi, the giulio and paoli both of 10 baiocchi, the testone of 30 baiocchi and the doppia of 3 scudi. In 1866, the scudo was replaced by the Papal lira, equivalent to the Italian lira, when the Papal States joined the Latin Monetary Union. The exchange rate used was 5.375 lire = 1 scudo.

In addition to issues for the Papal States as a whole, the currency was also issued by many of the individual municipalities. In the late 18th century, this included issues from Ancona, Ascoli, Bologna, Civitavecchia, Fano, Fermo, Foligno, Gubbio, Macerata, Matelica, Montalto, Pergola, Perugia, Ronciglione, San Severino, Spoleto, Terni, Tivoli and Viterbo. Uniquely in Bologna the baiocco, also known as the bolognino, was subdivided into 6 quattrini. In 1808, the Papal States were annexed by France, and the French franc circulated officially. When the Pope's authority was restored in 1814, the scudo was restored as the currency. However, outside Rome solely the coinage of Bologna was resumed. In 1849, another Roman Republic was established which issued coins centrally and in Ancona.

=== Tuscan florin ===
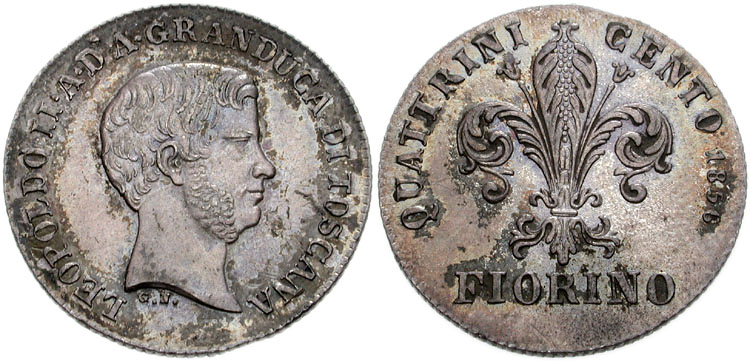
Tuscan florin, 1856.

The Tuscan florin was the currency of Tuscany between 1826 and 1859. It was subdivided into 100 quattrini (singular: quattrino), with an additional denomination called the paolo, worth 40 quattrini, in circulation.

During the Napoleonic Wars, Tuscany was annexed by France and the French franc was introduced, together with its satellite Italian lira. The previous lira did not disappear, creating a big confusion between the old Tuscan lira and the new Italian lira. So, when Duke Leopold II rose to power in 1824, he decided to introduce a new basic currency. The Tuscan florin replaced the Tuscan lira at a rate of 1 2/3 lire = 1 Tuscan florin.

In 1847, Tuscany absorbed Lucca and the Tuscan florin replaced the Luccan lira at a rate of 1 Tuscan florin = 2 lire. After a brief revolutionary coinage, the Tuscan florin was replaced in 1859 by a provisional currency denominated in "Italian lira", equal to the Sardinian lira, with 1 Tuscan florin = 1.4 Italian lire.

=== Lombardo-Venetian lira ===
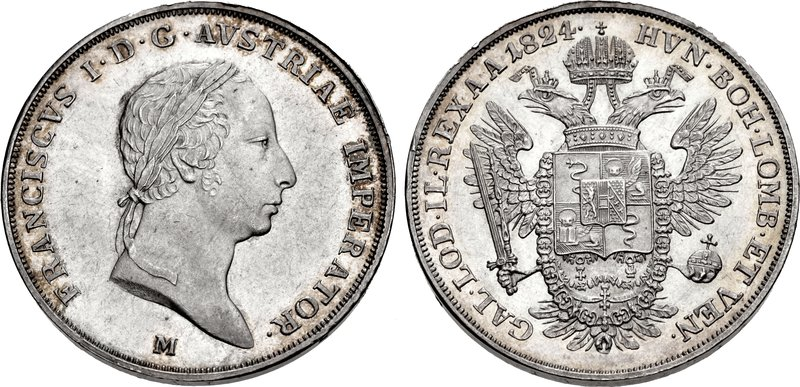
Lombardy-Venetia florin, 1824

The Lombardo-Venetian lira (or lira; plural: lire) was the currency of the Kingdom of Lombardy–Venetia between 1822 and 1861. The lira was made of 4.33 grams of silver (with 9/10 of purity). Six lire were equal to the scudo which was equivalent to the Austrian Conventionsthaler, hence they had no relation to the former currencies the Venetian lira and the Milanese scudo. The lira was divided into 100 centesimi (cents). Coins were minted in Milan and Venice.

During the revolutions of 1848, the Lombard Provisional Government briefly suspended the production of the lira and minted instead a special 5 Italian lire coin. After the revolutions and the restoration of the Austrian monetary standard, copper coins were reduced in weight. For political purposes the name on these coins (the most popular in circulation) was changed from Kingdom of Lombardy–Venetia to the Austrian Empire.

=== Lombardy-Venetia florin ===
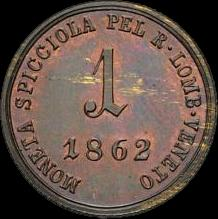
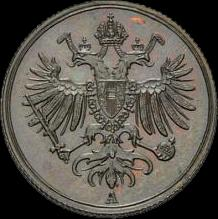
1 Lombardy-Venetia soldo (0,01 Lombardy-Venetia florins), 1862

The Lombardy-Venetia florin was the currency of Lombardy-Venetia (reduced to the sole Venetia three years before) between 1862 and 1866. It replaced the Lombardo-Venetian lira at a rate of 1 florin = 3 lire. The florin was equivalent to the Austro-Hungarian florin. Although it was subdivided into 100 soldi rather than 100 kreutzers, Austrian coins circulated in Venetia.

The only coins issued specifically for Venetia were copper 1/2 and 1 soldo pieces. The name soldo was chosen due to the equivalence of the predecimal kreutzer and soldo, both worth 1/120 of a Conventionsthaler.

The florin was replaced by the Italian lira at the rate of 1 lira = 40 1/2 soldi (1 florin = 2.469 lire). This rate corresponded to the comparative silver contents of the lira and florin coins.

=== Papal lira ===
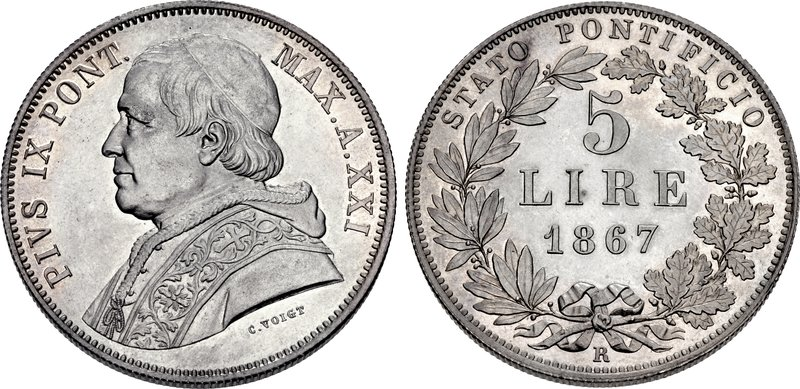
5 Papal lire, 1867

The Papal lira was the currency of the Papal States between 1866 and 1870. It was subdivided into 20 soldi, each of 5 centesimi. In 1866 Pope Pius IX, whose temporal domain had been reduced to only the province of Latium, decided to join the Latin Monetary Union. A new currency, the lira, was introduced with the same value of the French franc and the Italian lira.

It replaced the scudo at a rate of 5.375 lire = 1 scudo. The lira was subdivided into 100 centesimi and, differently from the other currencies of the union, into 20 soldi. However, all denomination in soldo had an equivalence in cents. However, after joining the Union, the Pope's treasurer, Giacomo Antonelli, devalued the purity of the Papal silver coins from 900/1000 to 835/1000. With the annexation of the Papal States to Italy in 1870, the Papal lira was replaced by the Italian lira at par.

=== Italian lira (Napoleonic) ===
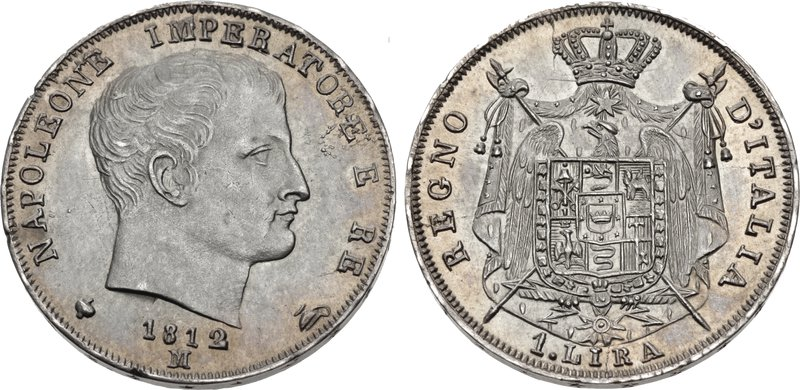
Silver 1 Lira depicting Napoleon I, 1812

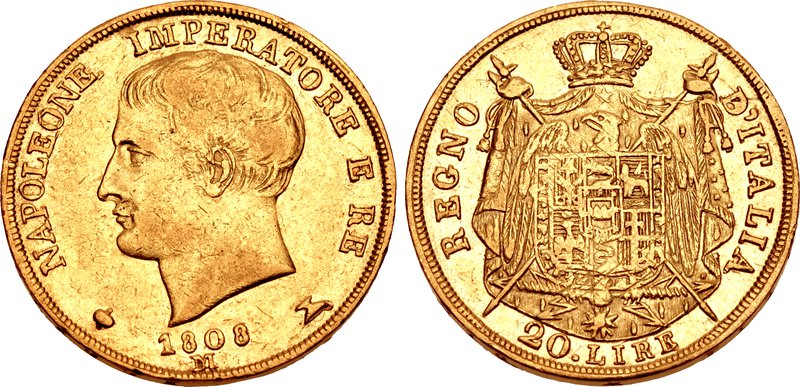
Gold 20 Lire depicting Napoleon I, 1808

The Napoleonic Kingdom of Italy introduced the Italian lira in 1807 at par with the French franc, worth 4.5 grams of fine silver or 0.29032 gram of fine gold (gold-silver ratio 15.5). Despite the kingdom's fall in 1814, this new lira eventually replaced the currencies of the different Italian states until their unification in 1861, replacing, among others:

- The Piedmontese scudo, Sardinian scudo and the Genoese lira after 1800, by the Italian lira;
- The Milanese lira, Venetian lira, Lombardo-Venetian lira and Parman lira after 1814, at the rate of 270 Milanese lire = 45 Milanese scudi = 405 Venetian lire = 855 Parman lire = 207.23 Italian lire;
- The Tuscan fiorino and the Tuscan lira in 1859, at 1 francescone = 4 fiorini = 6 2/3 Tuscan lire = 5.6 Italian lire;
- The piastra of Naples and Sicily in 1861, at 1 piastra = 1.2 ducat di regno = 5.1 Neapolitan lire, the latter at par with the Italian lira; and
- The scudo of Rome and the Papal States in 1866, at 1 scudo = 5.375 Papal lire, the latter at par with the Italian lira.

The Napoleonic Kingdom of Italy issued coins between 1807 and 1813 in denominations of 1 and 3 centesimi and 1 soldo (5 centesimi) in copper, c.10 in 20% silver alloy, s.5, s.10 and s.15 (or c.25, c.50 and c.75 centesimi), 1 lira, 2 lire and 5 lire in 90% silver and 20 lire and 40 lire in 90% gold. All except the c.10 bore a portrait of Napoleon I, with the denominations below 1 lira also showing a radiate crown and the higher denominations, a shield representing the various constituent territories of the Kingdom.

After the end of the Napoleonic Kingdom of Italy in 1814, the lira remained present only in the Duchy of Parma and the Kingdom of Piedmont-Sardinia. The lira of Parma was introduced by Duchess Marie Louise, Duchess of Parma, who issued coin denominations of 1, 3, 5, 25, 50 cents and 1, 2, 5, 20 and 40 lire, while gold coins of 10, 50, 80 and 100 lire were also minted from the Piedmont-Sardinia lira introduced by Victor Emmanuel I of Savoy.

== Contemporary period ==
Since Italy has been for centuries divided into many historic states, they all had different coinage systems, but when the country became unified in 1861, the Italian lira came into place, and was used until 2002. In 1999, the euro became Italy's unit of account and the lira became a national subunit of the euro at a rate of 1 euro = 1,936.27 lire, before being replaced as cash in 2002.

=== Italian lira ===
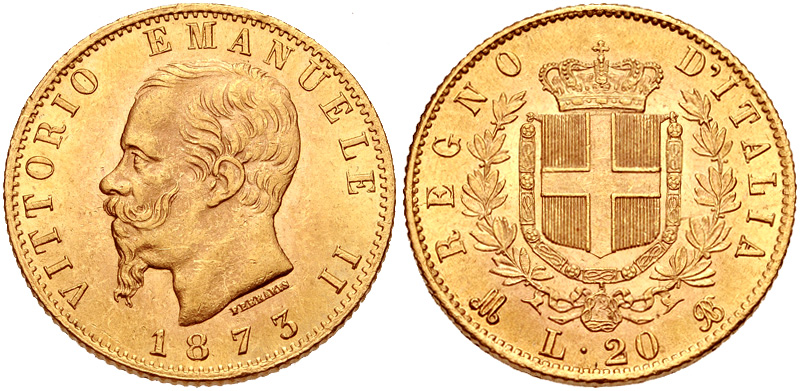
Gold 20 lire coin, 1873

The Italian lira (Plural: lire) was the currency of Italy between 1861 and 2002. It was introduced by the Napoleonic Kingdom of Italy in 1807 at par with the French franc, and was subsequently adopted by the different states that would eventually form the Kingdom of Italy in 1861. It was subdivided into 100 centesimi (singular: centesimo), which means "hundredths" or "cents". The lira was also the currency of the Albanian Kingdom from 1941 to 1943.

The term originates from libra, the largest unit of the Carolingian monetary system used in Western Europe and elsewhere from the 8th to the 20th century. The Carolingian system is the origin of the French livre tournois (predecessor of the franc), the Italian lira, and the pound unit of sterling and related currencies.

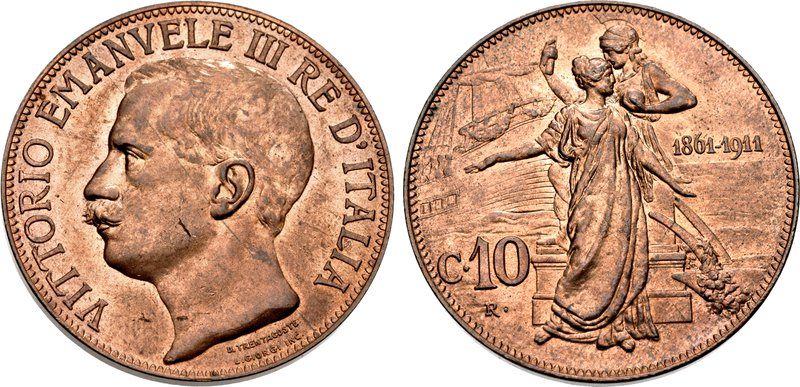
10 cent coin, 1911, with the personifications of Italy and of Rome with a ship in the background depicted on the reverse

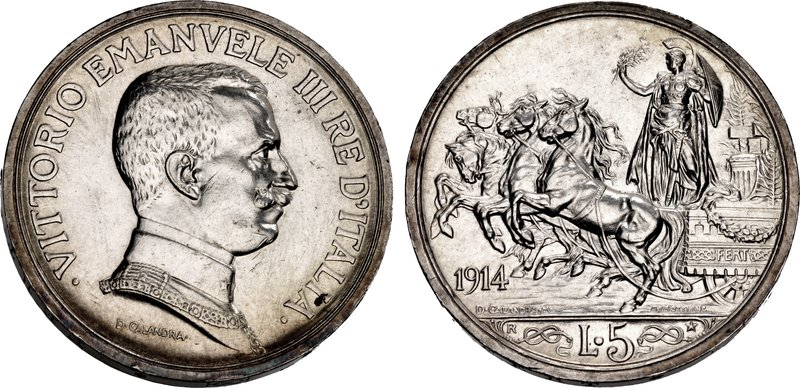
Silver 5 lire coin, 1914, with the personification of Italy standing on a quadriga depicted on the reverse

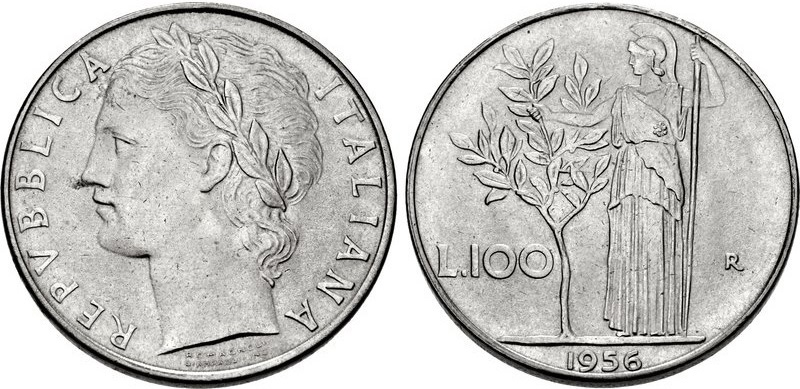
100 lire coin, 1956, with goddess Minerva holding an olive tree and a long spear depicted on the reverse

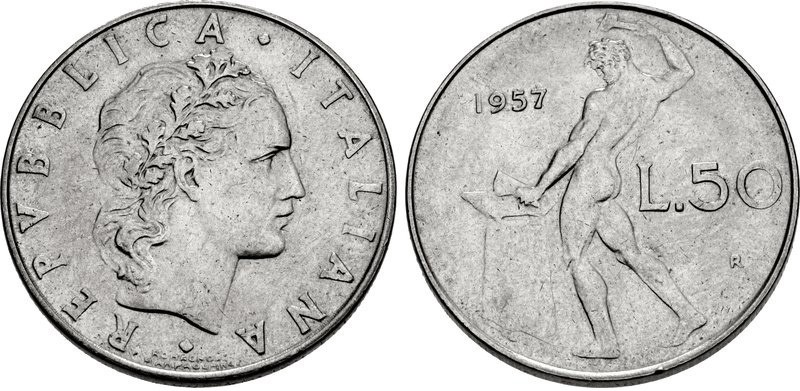
50 lire coin, 1957, with god Vulcan beating iron on an anvil depicted on the reverse

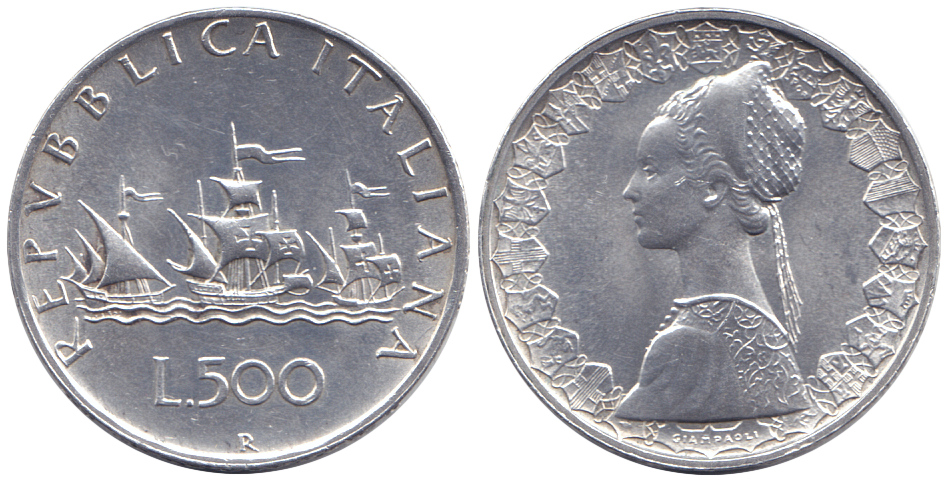
Silver 500 lire coin featuring the ships of Christopher Columbus, 1960

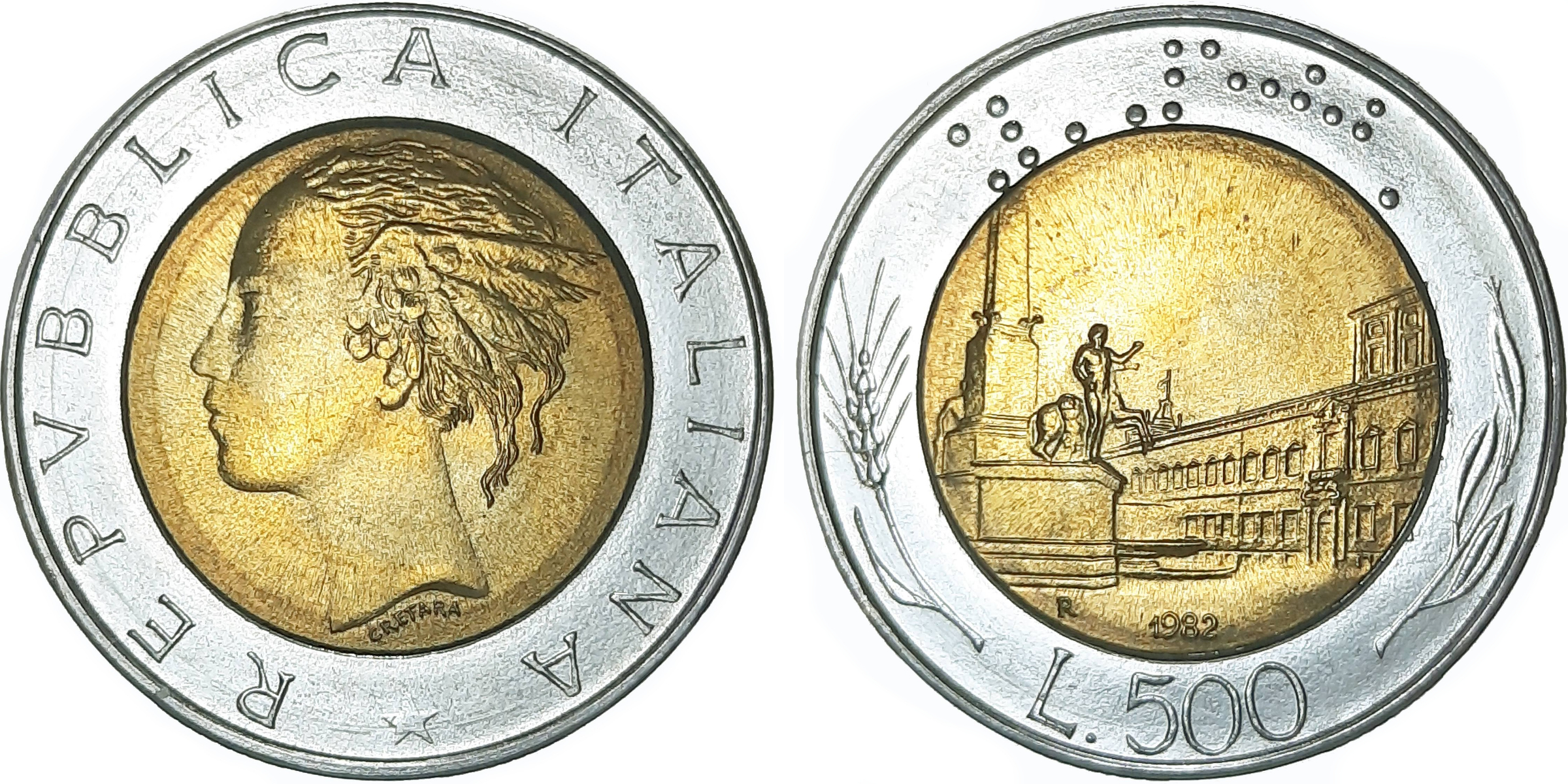
500 lire coin, 1982

There was no standard sign or abbreviation for the Italian lira. The abbreviations Lit. (standing for Lira italiana) and L. (standing for Lira) and the signs ₤ or £ were all accepted representations of the currency. Banks and financial institutions, including the Bank of Italy, often used Lit. and this was regarded internationally as the abbreviation for the Italian lira. Handwritten documents and signs at market stalls would often use "£" or "₤", while coins used "L." Italian postage stamps mostly used the word lire in full but some (such as the 1975 monuments series) used "L." The name of the currency could also be written in full as a prefix or a suffix (e.g. Lire 100,000 or 100,000 lire). The ISO 4217 currency code for the lira was ITL.

Italian unification also highlighted the confusion of the pre-unification Italian monetary system which was mostly based on silver monometallism and therefore in contrast with the gold monometallism in force in the Kingdom of Sardinia and in the major European nations. To reconcile the various monetary systems it was decided to opt for bimetallism, taking inspiration from the French franc model, from which the dimensions of the coins and the exchange rate of 1 to 15.50 between gold and silver were taken. The Italian monetary system, however, differed from the French one in two aspects: silver coins could be exchanged in unlimited quantities with the State, but limited quantities between private individuals and it was decided to mint coins that nominally had 900‰ fine silver, but which in fact they contained 835‰ so as to approach the real exchange rate between gold and silver which was approximately 1 to 14.38. Exactly four months after the proclamation of the Kingdom of Italy, the government introduced the new national currency, the Italian lira. The legal tender of the new currency was established by the Royal Decree of 17 July 1861 which specified the exchange of pre-unification coins into lire and the fact that local coins continued to be legal tender in their respective provinces of origin.

On 24 August 1862 the decree was issued which established the decommissioning of all other coins circulating in the various pre-unification states by the end of the year. Italian lira was a direct continuation of the Sardinian lira. Other currencies replaced by the Italian lira included the Lombardo-Venetian lira, the Two Sicilies piastra, the Tuscan fiorino, the Papal States scudo and the Parman lira. In 1865, Italy formed part of the Latin Monetary Union in which the lira was set as equal to, among others, the French, Belgian and Swiss francs: in fact, until the introduction of the euro in 2002, people speaking the Gallo-Italic dialects in north-western Italy usually called "franc" the lira.

In 1866, due to the growth of public spending, partly due to the costs of the Third Italian War of Independence, the inconvertible paper money system was established, which lasted until 1881 (with effect from 1883). However, already at the end of 1887 the convertibility of the notes had to be effectively suspended, even without openly declaring it. In 1893, the Banca Romana was put into liquidation, hit by a serious scandal, and the Bank of Italy was created, with a gold backing of at least 40% of the lire in circulation.

King Victor Emmanuel III, who succeeded his father Umberto I on the throne of Italy in 1900, was a scholar of numismatics and a great collector of coins; he published the Corpus Nummorum Italicorum (1909–1943), a work in 20 volumes in which Italian coins are described and classified. During his reign, a rich and varied circulating coinage was minted. Upon his abdication, he donated his coin collection to the Italian state: this collection is partially exhibited in the Roman national museum of Palazzo Massimo in Rome.

World War I broke the Latin Monetary Union and resulted in prices rising severalfold in Italy. Inflation was curbed somewhat by Mussolini, who, on 18 August 1926, declared that the exchange rate between lira and pound would be £1 = 90 lire—the so-called Quota 90, although the free exchange rate had been closer to 140–150 lire per pound. In 1927, the lira was pegged to the U.S. dollar at a rate of 1 dollar = 19 lire. This rate lasted until 1934, with a separate "tourist" rate of US$1 = 24.89 lire being established in 1936. In 1939, the "official" rate was 19.8 lire. After the Allied invasion of Italy during World War II, an exchange rate was set at US$1 = 120 lire (1 British pound = 480 lire) in June 1943, reduced to 100 lire the following month. In German-occupied areas, the exchange rate was set at 1 Reichsmark = 10 lire.

After the war, the Roman mint first issued the first 1, 2, 5 and 10 lira coins (6 September 1946). They were officially set up on 21 December of the same year and were used up to 1953–4. Italy joined the International Monetary Fund on 27 March 1947. The value of the lira fluctuated, before Italy set a peg of US$1 = 575 lire within the Bretton Woods System in November 1947. Following the devaluation of the pound, Italy devalued to US$1 = 625 lire on 21 September 1949. This rate was maintained until the end of the Bretton Woods System in the early 1970s.

In December 1973 some of the major OPEC countries decided to sharply increase the price of crude oil, thus triggering an oil crisis that hit the Italian economy hard. The increase in oil prices caused a sudden increase in the cost of money which in the spring of 1974 brought the Bank of Italy's discount rate to 9%; furthermore, to combat the crisis a lot of Government debt was issued which in 1975 exposed the lira to intense speculative phenomena. The increase in debt triggered by the oil crisis caused a strong devaluation compared to other European currencies and for its recovery the Bank of Italy raised the discount rate up to 15% in the autumn of 1976.

The lira was the official unit of currency in Italy until 1 January 1999, when it was replaced by the euro (euro coins and notes were not introduced until 2002). Old lira denominated currency ceased to be legal tender on 28 February 2002. The conversion rate is 1,936.27 lire to the euro. All lira banknotes in use immediately before the introduction of the euro, as all post WW2 coins, were still exchangeable for euros in all branches of the Bank of Italy until 29 February 2012.

=== Italian euro coins ===
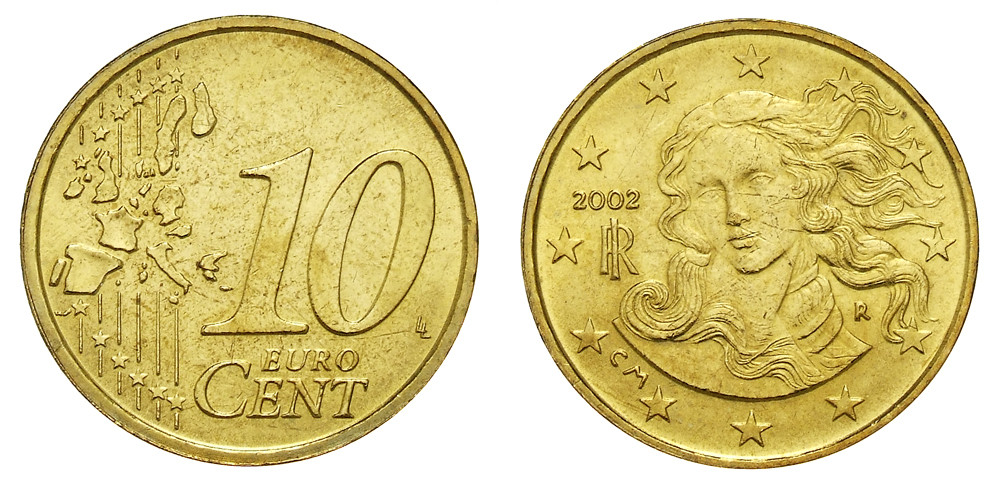
Italian 10 euro cent coin, with The Birth of Venus by Sandro Botticelli depicted on the reverse

The euro officially began circulating in Italy on 1 January 2002 (even though the creation of Italian lira coins was suspended in 1999). Italian euro coins have a design unique to each denomination, though there are many themes of works by one of the most renowned and famous Italian artists and painters. In particular, on the reverse of Italian euro coins are depicted:

- 1 euro cent coin: Castel del Monte, a 13th-century castle in Andria
- 2 euro cent coin: Mole Antonelliana, a tower symbolising the city of Turin
- 5 euro cent coin: Colosseum, famous Roman amphitheater
- 10 euro cent coin: The Birth of Venus by Sandro Botticelli
- 20 euro cent coin: Futurist sculpture Unique Forms of Continuity in Space by Umberto Boccioni
- 50 euro cent coin: Equestrian Statue of Marcus Aurelius
- 1 euro coin: Vitruvian Man, a drawing by Leonardo da Vinci
- 2 euro coin: Dante Alighieri, an Italian poet, writer and philosopher, considered the father of the Italian language

Each coin is designed by a different designer, from the 1 cent to the 2 euro coin they are: Eugenio Driutti, Luciana De Simoni, Ettore Lorenzo Frapiccini, Claudia Momoni, Maria Angela Cassol, Roberto Mauri, Laura Cretara and Maria Carmela Colaneri. All designs feature the 12 stars of the EU, the year of imprint, the overlapping letters "RI" for Repubblica Italiana (Italian Republic) and the letter R for Rome. There are no Italian euro coins dated earlier than 2002, even though they were certainly minted earlier, as they were first distributed to the public in December 2001.

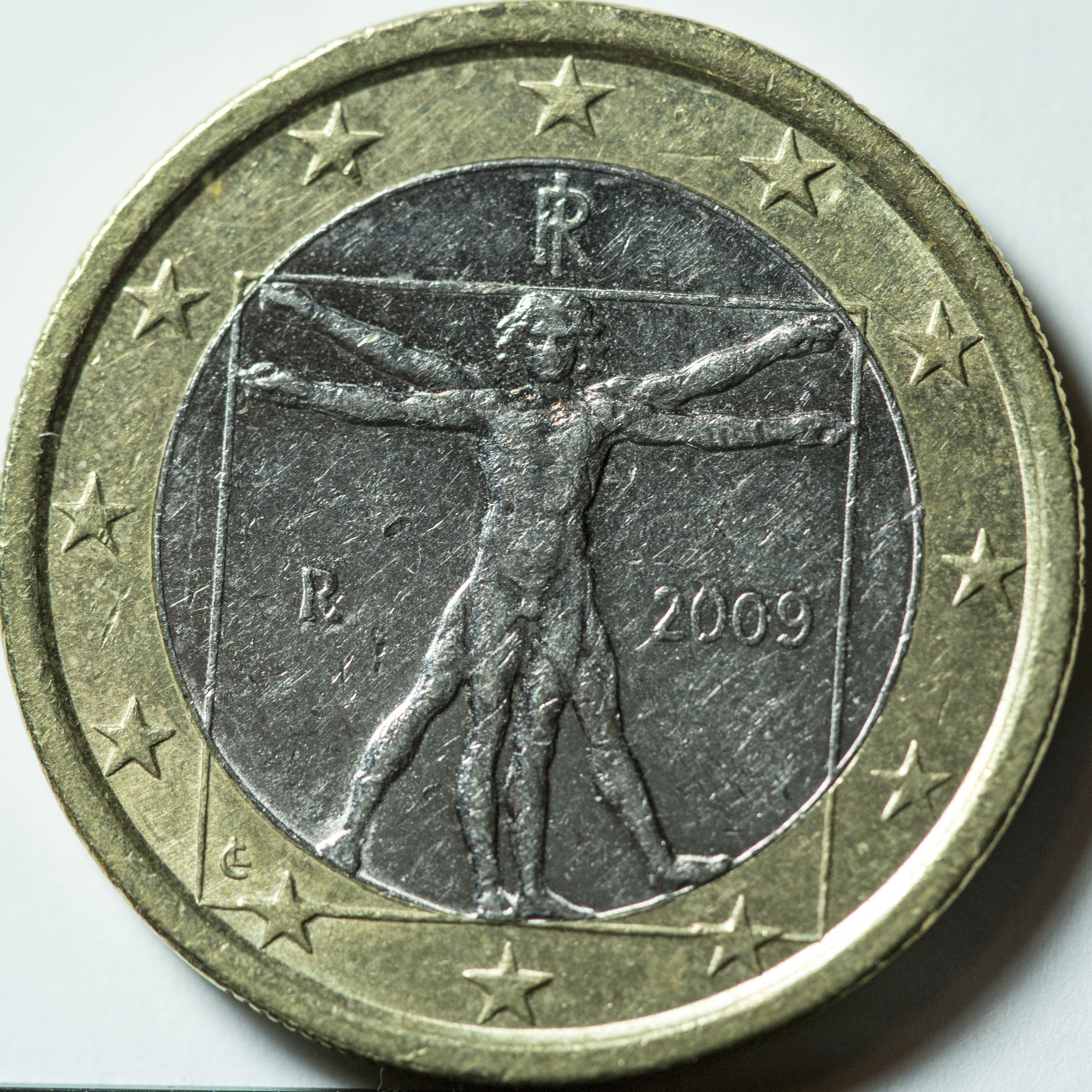
The reverse of the Italian 1 euro coin, with Vitruvian Man by Leonardo da Vinci depicted

The choice of the design of the coins was left to the Italian public by means of a television broadcast where alternative designs were presented, letting the people vote by calling a certain telephone number. However, the 1 euro coin was missing in this election, because Carlo Azeglio Ciampi, the then economy minister, had already decided it would sport the Vitruvian Man of Leonardo da Vinci. Leonardo's work is highly symbolic as it represents the Renaissance focus on man as the measure of all things, and has simultaneously a round shape that fits the coin perfectly. As Ciampi observed, this represents the "coin to the service of Man", instead of Man to the service of money.

As in Finland and the Netherlands, the minting of 1 and 2-cent coins was suspended in Italy from 1 January 2018. However, coins in circulation have legal value. The cost of creating a one-cent euro coin exceeded its face value, resulting in negative seigniorage. This amounted, in fact, to 4.5 cents. Even for the production of the two-cent coin, a sum greater than its value was spent: 5.2 cents.

In 1999, following a technical error, 1,179,335 pieces of 20 cents were minted with the 1999 millage, instead of the 2002 millage foreseen by the issuing decree. The minting error was discovered shortly afterwards and the then director of the Italian mint ordered the immediate deformation of the entire lot; unknown persons nevertheless managed to steal and put into circulation an unspecified number of coins, subject to seizure by the Guardia di Finanza as they were the exclusive property of the State. In 2002 the Italian mint mistakenly minted the reverse side of a hundred 1 cent coins with the Mole Antonelliana (which instead correctly went on the 2-cent coins), instead of the monument of Castel del Monte, in Apulia. Each of these coins has been valued by numismatists at more than 2,500 euros.

== See also ==
- Coinage of the Republic of Siena
- Coinage of the Republic of Venice
- Coins of the Italian lira
- Economic history of Italy
- Etruscan coins
- Greek coinage of Italy and Sicily
- Italian euro coins
- Roman currency
