= Sicilian piastra =

Currency of the Kingdom of Sicily

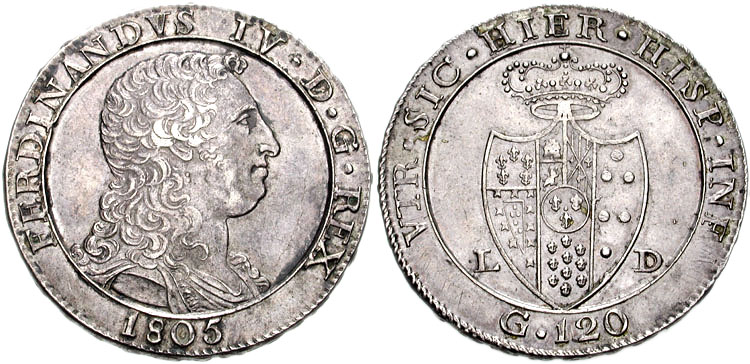
1805 Neapolitan piastra coin

The piastra was the distinct currency of the Kingdom of Sicily until 1815.

== History ==
In order to distinguish it from the piastra issued on the mainland Kingdom of Sicily (also known as the Kingdom of Naples), it is referred to as the "Sicilian piastra" as opposed to the "Neapolitan piastra". These two piastra were equal, but were subdivided differently. The Sicilian piastra was subdivided into 12 tarì, each of 20 grana or 120 piccoli. The oncia was worth 30 tarì (2 1/2 piastre).

In 1815, a single piastra currency was introduced for the Kingdom of the Two Sicilies, the Two Sicilies piastra.

== Coins ==
In the late 18th century, coins were circulating in denominations of 3 piccoli, 1, 2, 10 and 20 grana, 2, 3, 4 and 6 tari, 1 piastra and 1 oncia. These were struck in copper up to the 2 grana, with the higher denominations in silver. In 1801, copper 5 and 10 grana were introduced, followed by a gold 2 oncia in 1814.

Following the adoption of the unified currency for the two Sicilies, copper coins were issued in 1835 and 1836 bearing the name "Siciliana", in denominations of ½, 1, 2, 5 and 10 grana. It is unclear whether these coins were denominated in Two Sicilies grana or the old Sicilian grano (worth half as much).

== Riveli ==
From a Riveli in 1607 Catania, also a Riveli in 1811 Avola, the Sicilian money system can be readily extracted. It was:-

1 onza = 30 Tari, 1 Taro = 20 Grani, 1 Grano = 6 piccioli.

On both of these historic documents, the denomination piastra was not used. A Sicilian coin commonly available for sale today is the 120 grana silver piece, weighing an ounce. It is called, in the supplementary description of this silver piece, one piastra. However, in 1823 George Crabb, in his Universal Technological Dictionary Volume 2, in addition to supporting the above relative values of onze, tarì and grano in accounting, lists 120 grana as equivalent to one fiorino. Crabb also lists the ponto, the carlino, the ducat and the scudo or crown and their equivalence to the grano, however no mention of the piastre.

== See also ==
- History of coins in Italy
