= Tuscan lira =

Currency of Tuscany

Lira (Italian)
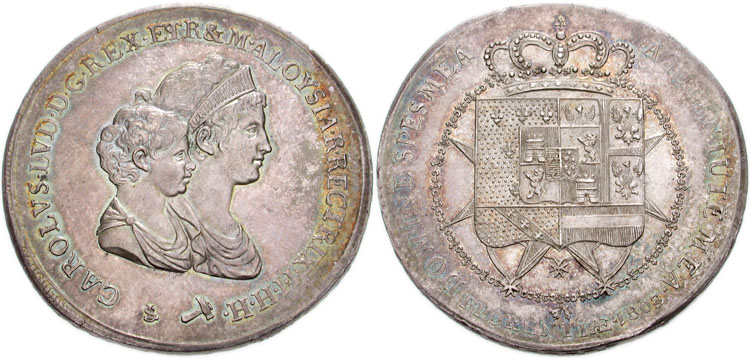
- 10 lire coin ("dena") depicting Charles Louis

Denominations
- Subunit
- 1/60: quattrino (q.)
- Coins: q.1, q.2, s.1/2, s.1, s.2, q.10 1 lira, 5 lire, 10 lire
- Rarely used: 20 lire, 40 lire

Demographics
- User(s): Tuscany; Etruria

Issuance
- Mint: Florence Mint
- This infobox shows the latest status before this currency was rendered obsolete.

The lira (plural: lire) was the currency of the Grand Duchy of Tuscany until its annexation by Napoleonic France in 1807. After that year, it unofficially remained in circulation thanks to its silver value until the restoration of Tuscan independence in 1814. It was finally abolished in 1826.

== History ==
It was subdivided into 20 soldi, each of 3 quattrini or 12 denari (singular: soldo, quattrino, denaro). Other denominations included the crazia worth q.5; the grosso worth q.20; the paolo worth q.40 or 2/3 lira; the testone worth 3 paoli; and the crown-sized francescone worth 10 paoli or 6 2/3 lire.

In 1803 the Tuscan lira was equivalent to 0.84 French francs, 0.84 Italian lira, or 3.78 grams of fine silver. In 1826 it was replaced by the Tuscan fiorino worth 100 quattrini or 1 2/3 lira.

== Coins ==
In the late 18th century, copper coins circulated in denominations of q.1, q.2, and s.1, together with billon q.10 and silver 1/2, 1, 2, 5 and 10 paoli. In the early 19th century, copper s.1/2 and s.2 were added, together with silver 1 lira and 10 lire.

The 10-lira coin was known as dena and the 5-lira coin was known as meza-dena ("half-dena").

== See also ==
- History of coins in Italy
