= Italian scudo =

Coins used in Italy from 1551 to the 1800s

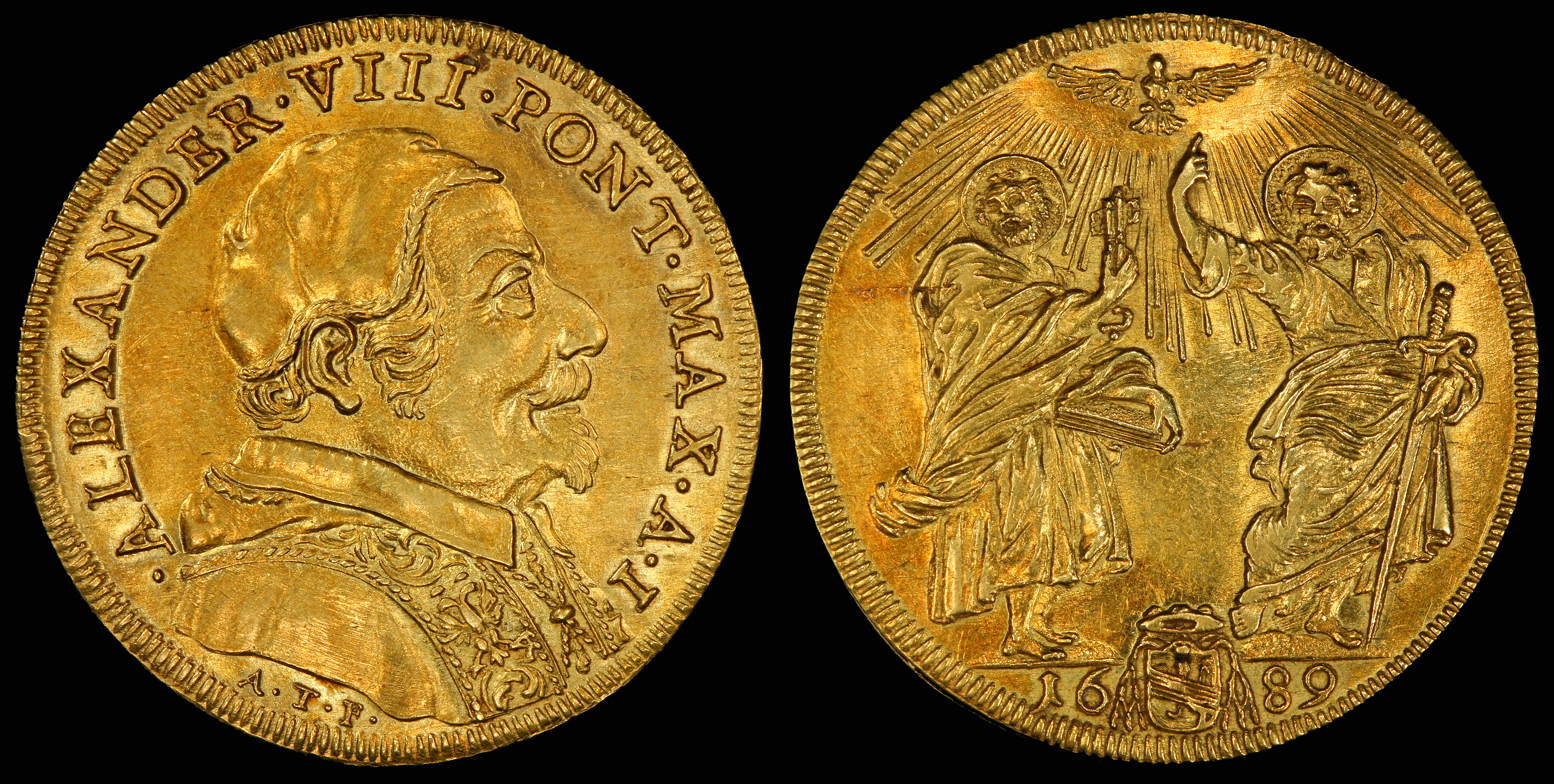
Papal States, Quadruple Scudo d'Oro (1689) depicting Pope Alexander VIII (obv) and Saints Peter and Paul (rev)

The scudo (pl. scudi) was the name for a number of coins used in various states in the Italian peninsula from 1551 until the 19th century. The name, like that of the French écu and the Spanish and Portuguese escudo, was derived from the Latin scutum ("shield"). From the 16th century, the name was used in Italy for large silver coins. Sizes varied depending on the issuing country.

== History ==
The first scudo d'argento (silver shield) was issued in 1551 by Charles V (1519–1556) in Milan.

Under Maria Theresa and Joseph II the scudo d'argento had a weight of 23.10 g and a fineness of 896/1000.

In the Kingdom of Lombardy–Venetia (under the control of the Habsburg Austrian Empire), the Lombardy–Venetia scudo was equivalent to the Conventionsthaler and was subdivided into six lire.

Before the Napoleonic Wars, the lira was subdivided into 20 soldi, each of 12 denari. Later, the lira was made up of 100 centesimi.

When Austria-Hungary decimalized in 1857, the scudo was replaced by the florin at a rate of 2 florin = 1 scudo. Coins of 1/2 and 1 soldo were issued, equal to 1/2 and 1 kreuzer respectively, for use in Lombardy and Venetia.

In the Papal States, the Papal States scudo was the currency until 1866. It was divided into 100 baiocchi (sing. baiocco), each of 5 quattrini. It was replaced by the lira, equal to the Italian lira.

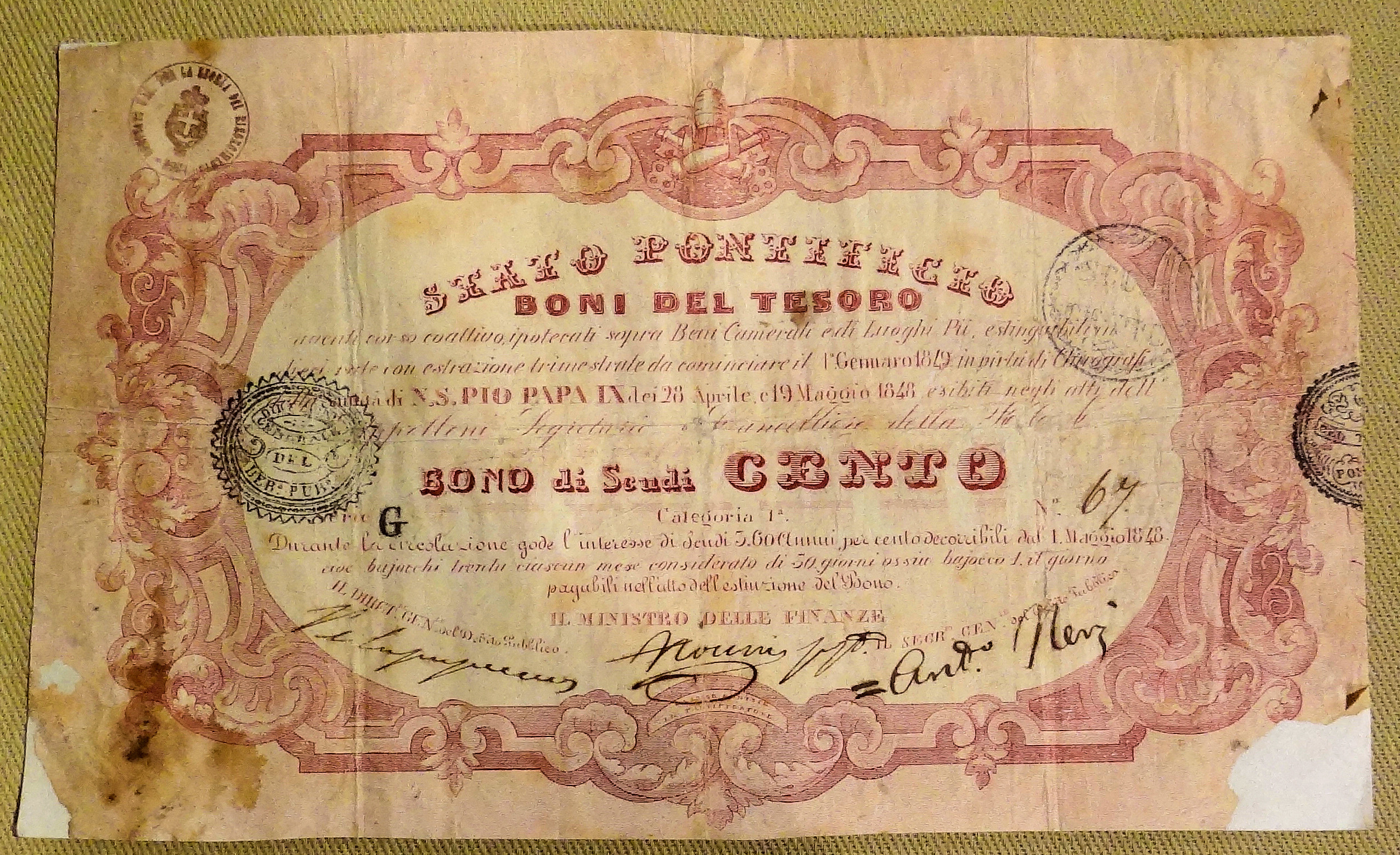
100 Scudi bond issued in the 19th century

The Duchy of Modena and Reggio also issued scudi, worth four lire or one third of a tallero.

In Malta under the Order of St John, the Maltese scudo circulated from the 16th century until the Order was expelled in 1798. The currency remained the official currency of Malta until 1825 and the last coins were removed from circulation in 1886. The Sovereign Military Order of Malta has issued coins denominated in scudi since 1961.

== See also ==
- History of coins in Italy
