= Postage stamps and postal history of Tuscany =

Between 1851 and 1860, the Grand Duchy of Tuscany, an independent Italian state until 1859 when it joined the United Provinces of Central Italy, produced two postage stamp issues which are among the most prized classic stamp issues of the world, and include the most valuable Italian stamp.

== Tuscany's modern history ==
The Grand Duchy of Tuscany was an independent Italian state from 1569 to 1859, but was occupied by France from 1808 to 1814. The Duchy comprised most of the present area of Tuscany, and its capital was Florence. In December 1859, the Grand Duchy officially ceased to exist, being joined to the Duchies of Modena and Parma to form the United Provinces of Central Italy, which was annexed by the Kingdom of Sardinia a few months later in March 1860. In 1862 it became part of the Kingdom of Italy.

== Pre stamp letters ==
Tuscany's mail service may be traced to private letter services operating between 1300 and 1400. In 1704, Grand Duke Gian Gastone de' Medici issued a decree converting the postal service to a state operation and regulating the posting, transport and delivery of letters in detail. The original service ran only between Florence, Pisa and Livorno.

Prior to the introduction of postage stamps in 1851, letters typically were sent postage due, with various postal markings added to the letter. Postal markings were originally hand written on the letters, and in about 1767, postal markings began to be added by rubber stamp, indicating the town of origin. In 1839, postal markings were introduced indicating the date the letter was mailed. Tuscany's pre-stamp letters and postal markings have received extensive philatelic study. The primary study of them is Paolo Vollmeier's I Bolli Postali Toscani del Periodo Prefilatelico fino al 1851, Florence, 1974.

== Postal treaties ==
On December 31, 1838, Tuscany signed a postal agreement with the Kingdom of Sardinia, and on April 8, 1839, it signed a similar agreement with Austria. These agreements regulated postal rates and procedures for transporting mail between the countries. Another postal convention between Tuscany and Austria was signed in December 1850, which addressed the exchange of mail between the countries and contemplated the introduction of adhesive stamps. Postal conventions with Sardinia and France were entered into in 1851.

== Tuscany's adhesive stamps ==
=== Il Marzocco ===
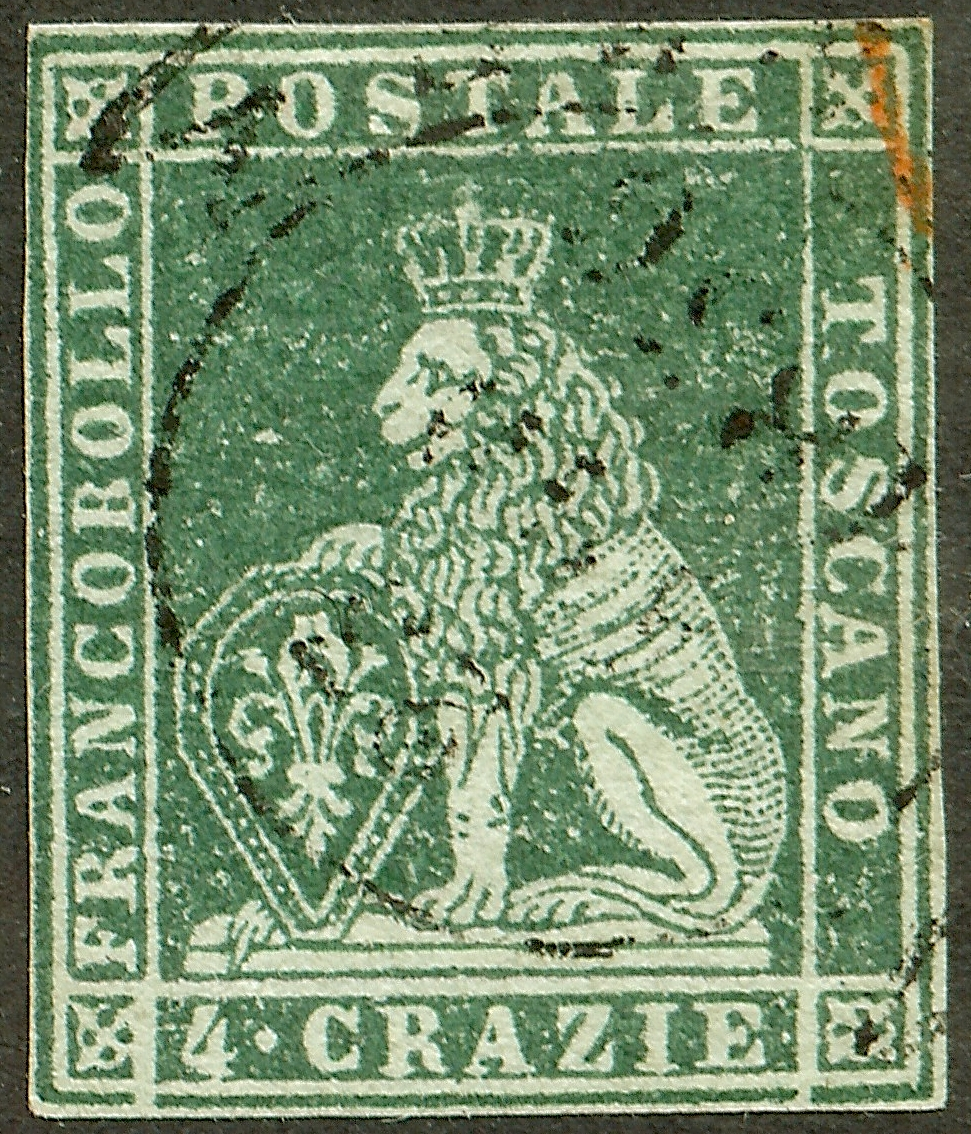
4 crazie stamp from 1851

On April 1, 1851, Tuscany issued its first adhesive postage stamps. The stamps depict a crowned lion resting a paw on a shield with the fleur-de-lis. The image is based on a Renaissance sculpture by Donatello of a lion called the Marzocco, which was originally commissioned for Pope Martin V and later moved in 1812 to the Piazza della Signoria in Florence, where it became a symbol of Florentine liberties. The stamps shared a common design, differing only in color and denomination. The stamps were initially issued in denominations of 1 and 2 soldi, and 2, 4 and 6 crazie. In July 1851, 1 and 9 crazie stamps were issued and in 1852, Tuscany introduced a 1 quattrino for mailing newspapers and a 60 crazie stamp for international use. The Tuscan lira was divided into 12 crazie, or 20 soldi or 60 quattrini.

These stamps were printed by typography by F. Cambiagi at the Grand Ducal Printing Office in Florence. The stamps were engraved by Giuseppe Niderost from which electrotypes were prepared by M. Alessandri of Florence. The stamps were imperforate and were printed in sheets of 240 subjects divided into three panes of 80 stamps each. The paper was lightly toned blue or gray and was watermarked with rows of the Crown of Tuscany between parallel lines.

Between 1857 and 1859, the stamps, other than the 2 soldi and 60 crazie values, were reissued in the same or similar colors, but printed on white paper with a watermark with intersecting curved lozenges and the words "II E RR POSTE TOSCANE". These, like the prior issue, were typographed, imperforate and printed in sheets of 240 subjects divided into three panes of 80 stamps each.

=== Arms of Savoy ===
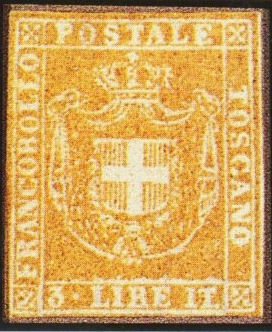
3 lire stamp from 1860, Italy's most valuable stamp

Grand Duke Leopold II abdicated on July 21, 1859, and was succeeded by his son, Ferdinand IV, who was deposed after 27 days. Tuscany briefly became part of the United Provinces of Central Italy, a short-lived client state of the Kingdom of Piedmont-Sardinia, which resulted in Sardinian currency being introduced in which one lira was divided into 100 centesimi. On 7 November 1859, the United Provinces elected Eugenio Emanuele di Savoia-Carignano as their regent. A new series of provisional stamps was issued on January 1, 1860, using the same border, but the lion was replaced with the arms of the House of Savoy. Like the prior two issues, these stamps were typographed, imperforate and printed in sheets of 240 subjects divided into three panes of 80 stamps each. In March 1860, Tuscany was annexed to Sardinia, after which Tuscany used the stamps of Sardinia, and in 1862, Italy.

Tuscany's postage stamps are among the most highly prized and collected classic stamps and have been extensively studied by philatelists. The primary study on them is F. Bargagli Petrucci's I Bolli Postali Toscani del Periodo Filatelico dal 1851 (1976). The three lire stamp of the 1860 issue in mint condition is the most valuable Italian stamp.

== Forgeries ==
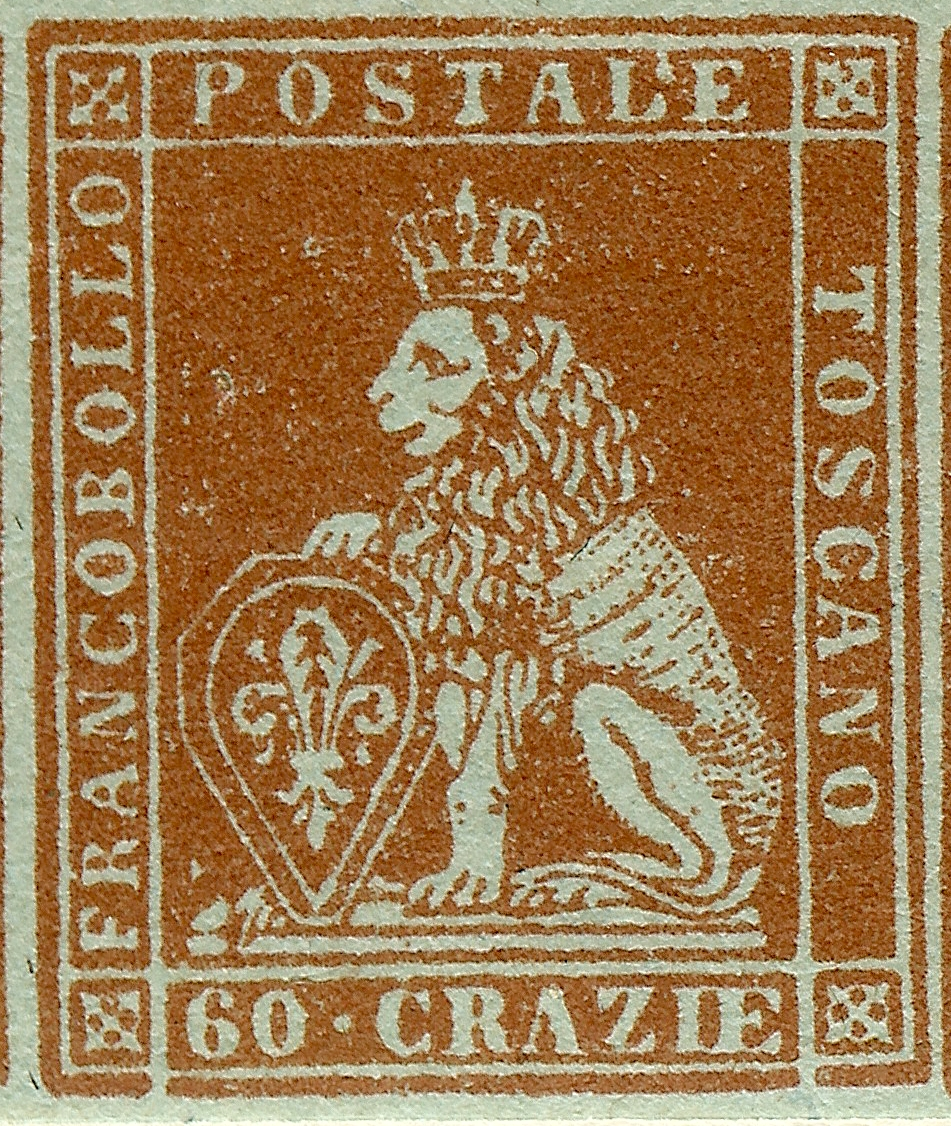
Fournier forgery of 60 crazie stamp from 1852

Tuscany's postage stamps have been forged numerous times for the philatelic market. Fernand Serrane stated in 1927 that "a small book would be needed to describe in detail the more than 100 or so counterfeits of the first two Tuscany issues."

== See also ==
- Postage stamps and postal history of Italy

== References and sources ==
Sources

- James A. Mackay, The World of Classic Stamps, 1840–1870, New York, 1972.
- Paolo Vollmeier, I Bolli Postali Toscani del Periodo Prefilatelico fino al 1851, Florence 1974. Page reference is to brief English translation inserted in book.
- Vaccari, Francobolli e Storia Postale: Antichi Stati Italiani Governi Provvisori Regno d'Italia 1850–1863, 8th ed. 1999/2000, Vignola.
- W.A.S. Westoby, The Adhesive Postage Stamps of Europe, London, 1900.
