= Newspapers in the Papal States in 17th and 18th centuries =

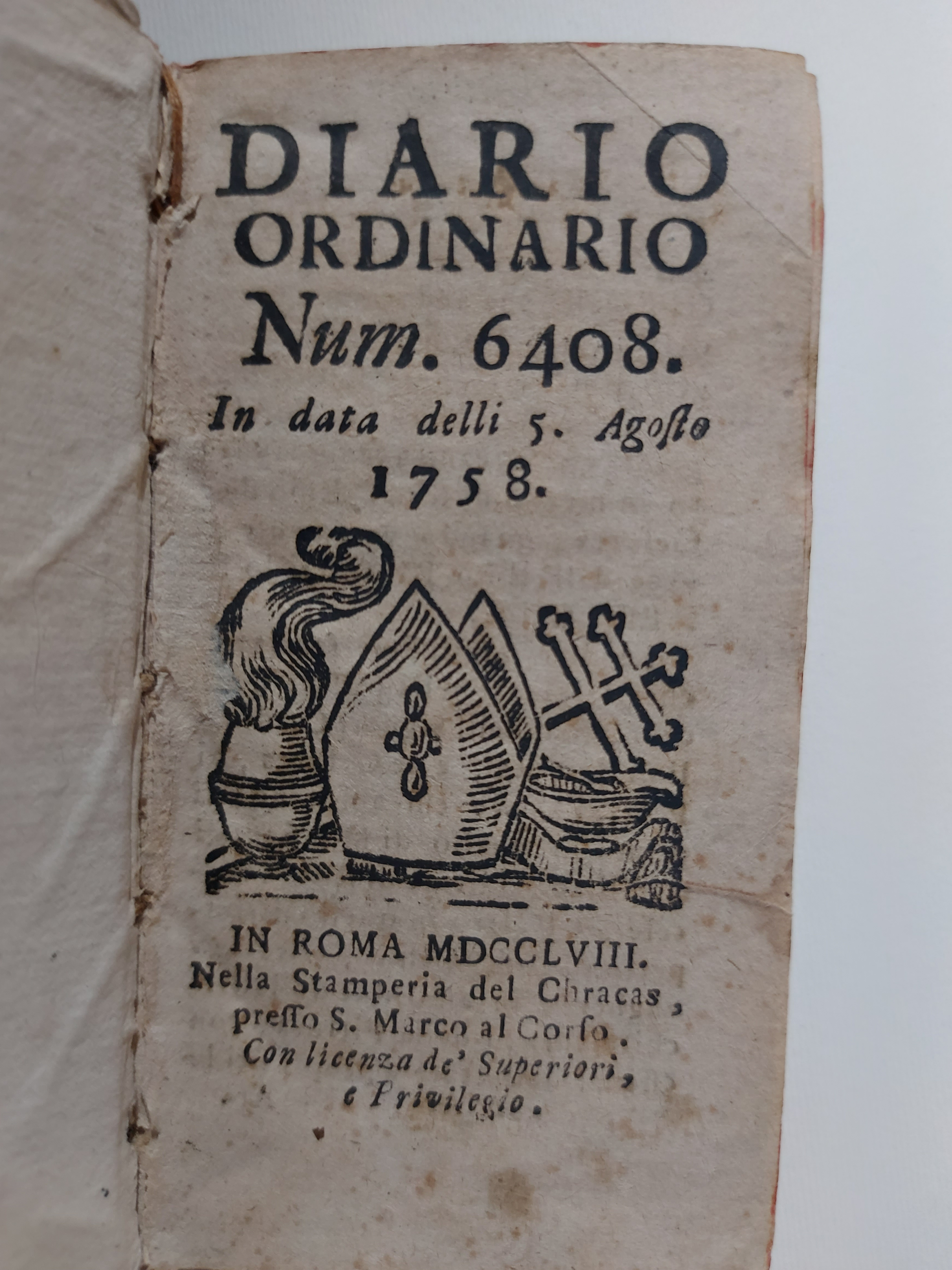
Diario Ordinario printed by Chracas in Rome on 5 August 1758.

During the 17th and 18th centuries, newspapers, known as gazettes, were printed in the Papal States, from 1642 to the Napoleonic era.

Unlike France (during the ancien régime) and the rest of Italy, where governments typically authorized only one gazette per nation until the late 18th century (such as the Gazette de France, Milano or Modona), the Papal States saw the emergence of multiple newspapers—almost one for each major city. These gazettes relied heavily on the schedules of couriers for both receiving news and distributing printed materials. Since couriers typically passed through only once or twice a week, the frequency of publication remained usually weekly until around 1750. However, all newspapers required official authorization and were subject to government censorship.

Publishing gazettes was a relatively profitable business. Much of the news was freely sourced from other newspapers carried by couriers, while annual subscription fees paid in advance ensured financial stability. Additionally, newspaper printing provided an opportunity for publishers to sell their printed materials beyond their own cities.

In Rome, the first newspaper, Diario Ordinario printed by Chracas, was not published until 1716. It remained the city's sole newspaper until the Jacobin Notizie Politiche appeared in 1788, though this publication lasted only two years. The situation changed drastically with the Napoleonic invasion of Italy in 1796 and the subsequent establishment of the Roman Republic.

== Early gazettes ==
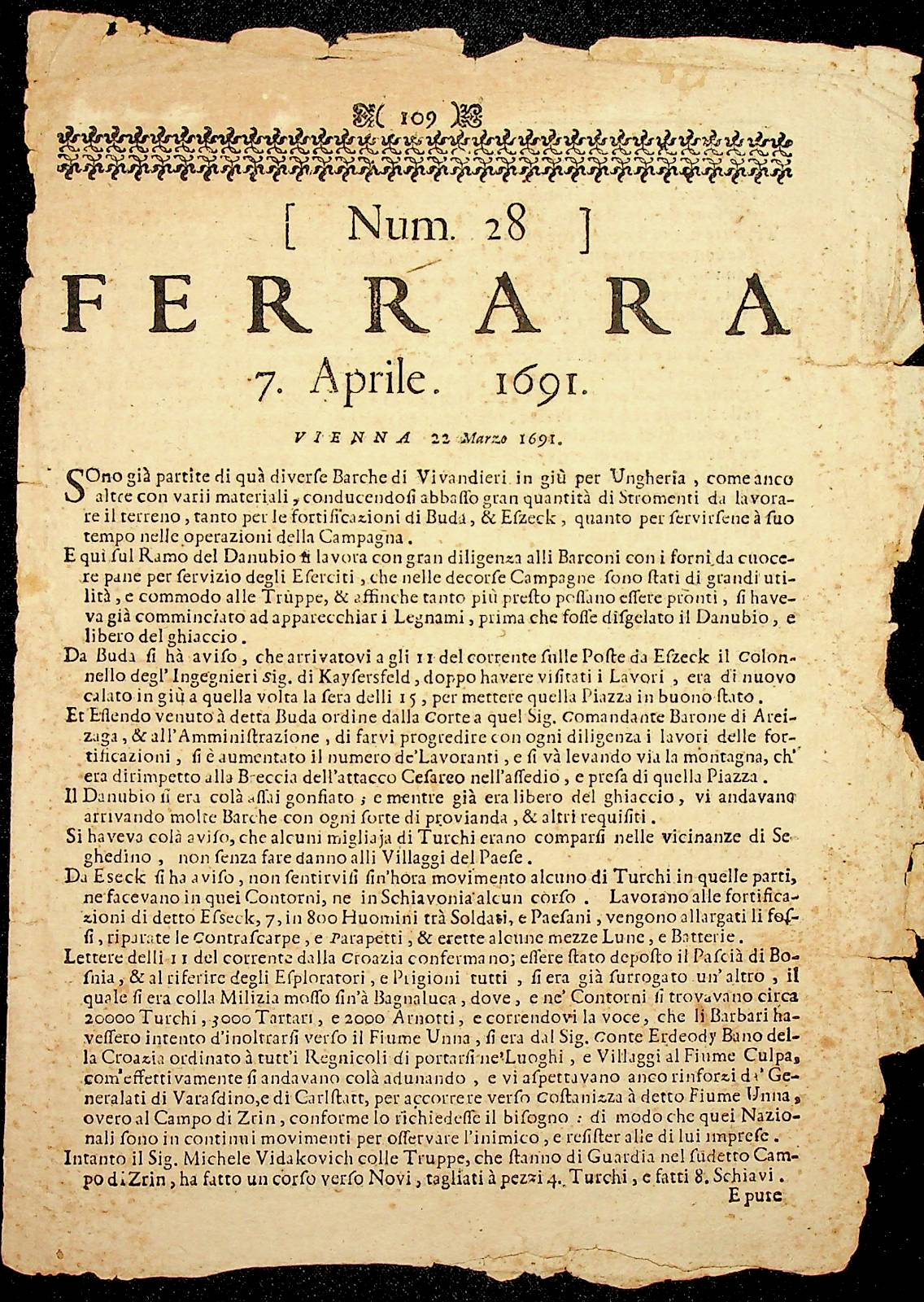
Ferrara printed by G.Filoni on 7 April 1691.

In the 17th century, Italian gazettes took the form of printed avvisi (handwritten newsletters), typically consisting of four densely packed pages of information. These were organized by the date and the name of the town from which the news originated. The title usually included the town where the gazette was printed, followed by the date of issue and, occasionally, the edition number. When present, the colophon appeared as a single line on the last page. Many of these gazettes were printed in only a few hundred copies, and very few have survived, making it difficult to trace their editorial history in detail.

=== Bologna (1642–1797) ===
The first newspaper printed in the Papal States was Bologna, published in the town of Bologna. The earliest known surviving edition is dated 28 June 1642, and the newspaper remained in circulation until 1787. The Archiginnasio Library houses a significant online collection of this weekly publication. (Note: Online collection of Bologna) From 1788 to his last number in June 1797, the newspaper was renamed Gazzetta di Bologna.

=== Rimino (1660–1776) ===
Rimino, an older form of the name of the town Rimini, is the title used for various newspapers printed in Rimini, sometimes appearing simply as Rimini. (Note: National Library Service of Italy: ICCU RAV1485517)

- Salimbene Salimbeni was the first editor and printer of a gazette in Rimini. The Gambalunga library holds editions spanning from 10 August 1660 to 26 December 1662. The newspaper continued until September 1663, when a foreign policy article caused controversy in Rome. As a result, Cardinal Giulio Rospigliosi, the Secretary of State, ordered the closure of the printing house and the arrest of both Salimbeni and the censor. However, one additional issue published by Salimbeni in 1671 is known to exist.
- The Dandi brothers, beginning in 1686 printed a seasonal newspaper in Rimini focused on the Great Turkish War. (Note: titled Giornale militare in cui succintamente raccontasi quanto giorno per giorno succede nell'armata cesarea sotto la città di Buda, & altre piazze dell'Ungheria) In 1688, they launched their own weekly publication titled Rimino, which continued under that name until 28 July 1694. That year, the Dandi brothers relocated to Ravenna, where they continued printing their newspaper under the name of their new city.
- A printer named Leonardi in August 1694 purchased authorization to publish the gazette Rimini for an annual fee of 35 Roman scudo. However, he soon went bankrupt and moved to Urbino in early 1695.
- Diego Domenico Ferraris published his Rimino between 1699 and 1702.
- Giuseppe Albertini and his heirs printed Rimino weekly on Tuesdays throughout the first half of the 18th century, continuing until 1776.

=== Other gazettes ===
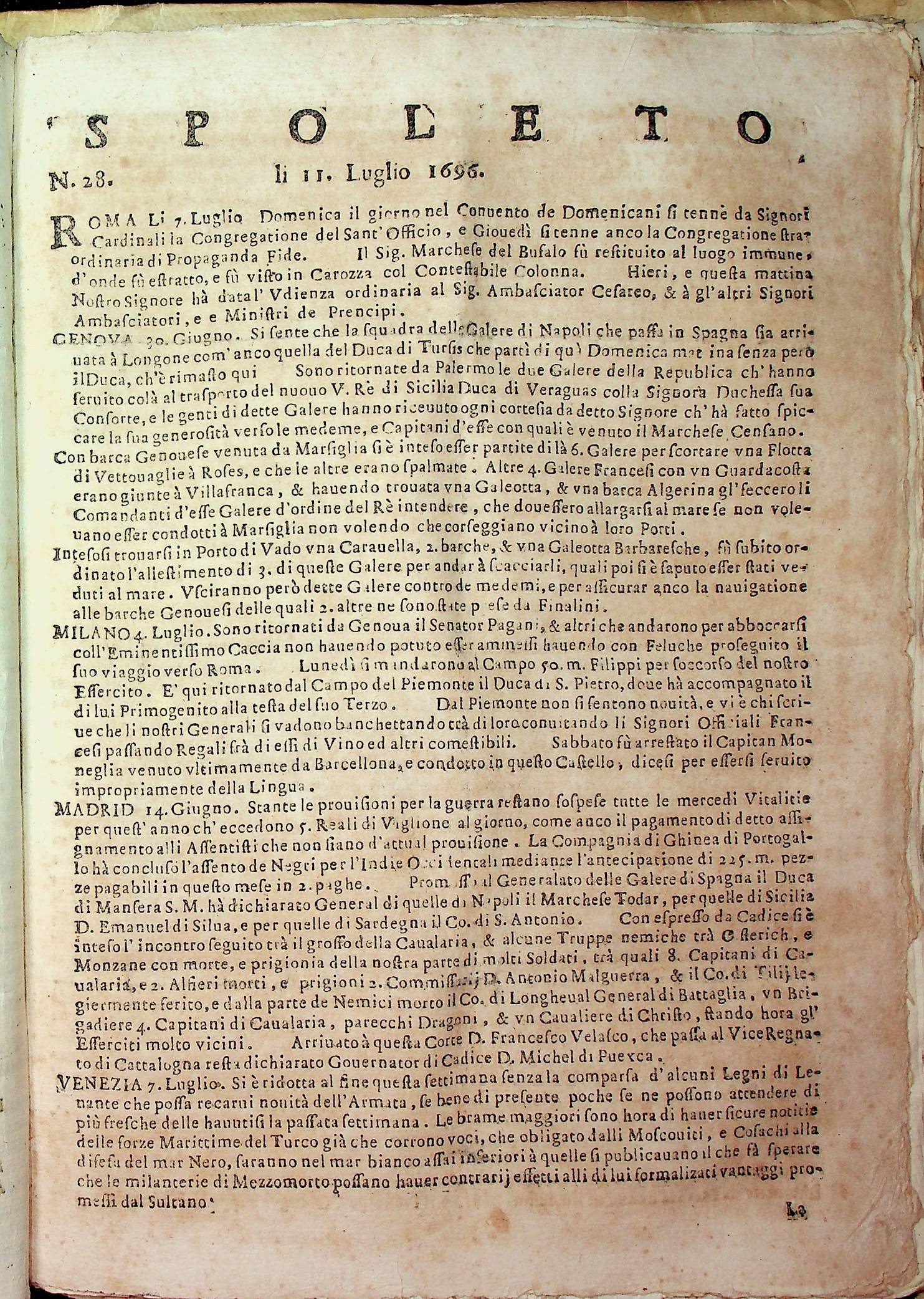
Spoleto.

- Macerata (1667–1683): the Planettiana Library in Jesi holds the only known issues of this newspaper, with the earliest surviving edition dated 8 December 1673. The collection includes all issues from 1682 and 22 from 1683. The newspaper was printed by Carlo Zenobj. A number dated 13 April 1667 was mentioned in a 1926 paper but has since been lost.
- Ancona (1676–1721): the oldest known issues of this newspaper, dated 1668 and printed by Francesco Serafini, are now lost. The earliest surviving edition, printed by G.B. Salvioni, is dated 10 June 1676. In 1684, two newspapers with the same title but different content were published in Ancona: one by F. Serafini and the other by G.B. Salvioni, both officially authorized. By 1689, one was published by F. Serafini and the other by G.B. Francheschetti. From 1695 to 1708, two newspapers continued to exist, printed by Stamperia Camerale and Pietro Paolo Ridolfi. The two editions remained in circulation until 1721, then printed by Stamperia Camerale and N. Belelli. (Note: National Library Service of Italy: ICCU RML0150195)
- Sinigaglia (1687–1688): the Planettiana Library in Jesi preserves the only known issues of this newspaper, spanning from 14 January 1687 to 18 May 1688. It was printed by Paolo Serafini. The title, based on the town Senigallia, appeared in different spellings, including Sinigaglia, Senogaglia, and Senogallia.
- Spoleto (1688–1728): printed by Giuseppe Giuliani from 1688 to 1706, the newspaper was later continued by Giuseppe Parenti until 1728. (Note: National Library Service of Italy: ICCU UM10015911)
- Ferrara (1691–1722): First printed by Girolamo Filoni in 1691, this newspaper was published three times a week—on Tuesdays, Wednesdays, and Saturdays. By 1702, each issue was sold for two baiocchi (a baiocco being one hundredth of a Roman scudo).
- Ravenna (1694–1707): The Dandi printers relocated to Ravenna, where they continued publishing their newspaper, previously printed in Rimini. To be allowed to publish it, they agreed to pay an annual fee of 20 Roman scudos to the government. The first issue is dated 9 August 1694, and the last was printed on 12 March 1698, before they moved to Forlì.
- Forlì (1698–1705): In March 1698, the Dandi printers arrived in Forlì and resumed publication of their newspaper, previously printed in Ravenna. From February 1701 to January 1705, their Forlì newspaper was printed alongside the literary magazine Gran giornale de’ letterati, whose editors lived in Venice. In 1710, they renamed the publication Effemeridi del mondo novellistico, pairing it with an astrological paper, though it met with little success. Other newspapers printed in Forlì include one edition dated 1701 by Giovan Battista Zampa, and another published on Wednesdays by Alessandro Fabbri in the early 18th century.
- Urbino (1695–1698): this newspaper was printed in Urbino by Leonardi, a printer originally from Rimini, between 1695 and 1698.
- Assisi (1701–1710): the earliest known issue from this newspaper, dated 11 March 1710, was printed by Lorenzo Mastici. A 1701 issue was once recorded, but it has since been lost.
- Cesena (1701–1727): in 1701, Demetrio Degni, who had previously printed Modona, left the Duchy of Modena and settled in Cesena, where he continued his printing work. His newspaper, Cesena, is documented in issues from 1706 and 1708, and likely ceased publication by 1712 when Degni moved to Pesaro. Afterward, the printing of the newspaper in Cesena was taken over by Giuseppe Gherardi, with known issues dating to 1712.
- Terni (1701–1708): Only four known issues survive, all dated 1708, edited by N. Salutio. A 1701 edition was once recorded, but it is now lost.

== Newspapers printed in Foligno ==
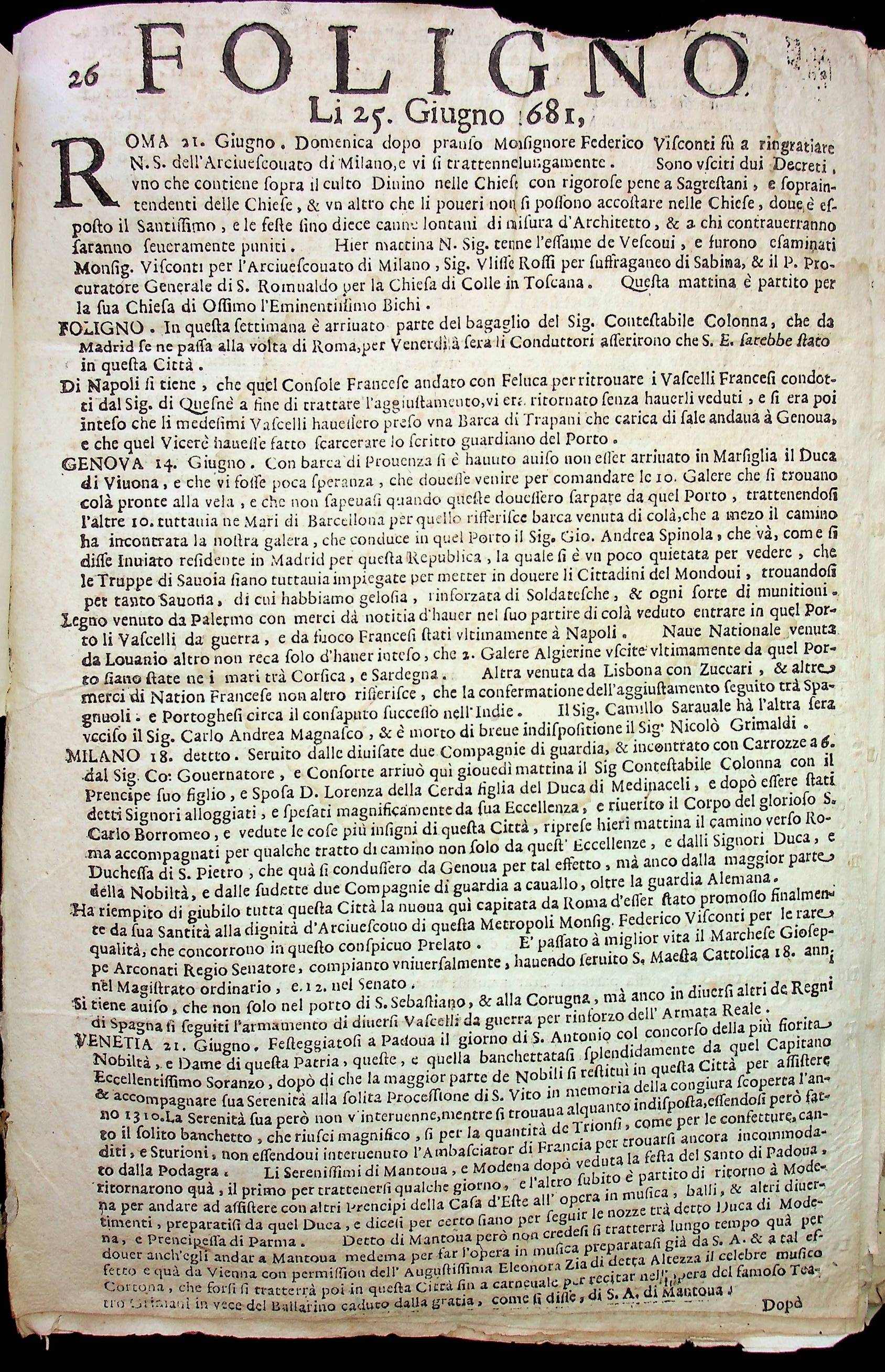
Foligno printed by A.Mariotti on 25 June 1681.

The town of Foligno has long been renowned for its strong tradition in printing. Notably, it was the site where an edition of Dante Alighieri’s Divina Commedia was printed. In the 18th century, both Foligno and nearby Spello produced the famous almanac Barbanera. Foligno’s strategic location at a junction of the Flaminia road made it a hub for news distribution. One branch of the road brought information from Ancona, Rimini, Venice, and Austria, while the other conveyed news from Bologna, Mantua, Milan, Germany, and France. As the first recipients of news from couriers, Foligno’s printers quickly published and distributed their newspapers, primarily in Rome.

=== Foligno or Fuligno ===
By the late 17th century, at least four gazettes were published in Foligno, each produced by different typographers with distinct editorial content. All carried the title Foligno, sometimes written as Fuligno.

- Mariotti typographers (1680–1707): Antonio Mariotti founded his printing workshop in Foligno in 1677, taking over from the Alterij printers. He successfully obtained a letters patent to operate as the town’s public printer. Expanding his business, Mariotti launched his own newspaper of avvisi, titled Foligno, in 1680. The oldest surviving issue is dated 21 August 1680, held in the Biblioteca Planettiana in Jesi. Mariotti continued publishing the newspaper until 1708. Some issues from 1701 and 1704, as well as the entire 1705 run, were printed in his Spello printshop, managed by his son Gregorio Uboldo, while the editorial office remained in Foligno. (Note: National Library Service of Italy: ICCU URB0972804)
- Barugi typographers (1686): only one known issue of this newspaper exists, dated 6 December 1686, printed by Luca Barugi.
- Zenobi typographers (1686–1693): Gaetano Zenobi and his brother Carlo established their printing house in 1684, earning the title of episcopal printers. They published their Fuligno from 1686 to 1693.
- Campitelli typographers (1696–1785): Niccolò Campitelli opened his printshop in 1694, succeeding the Zenobi printers. That same year, he began printing his Fuligno, which continued for many decades under his son, Feliciano. (Note: National Library Service of Italy: ICCU LO10884374)
- Campana typographers (1706–1775): Born in Foligno on 9 September 1679, Pompeo Campana worked with his brother-in-law Niccolò Campitelli for a year and a half before gaining two years of experience as a bookseller. He then established his own printing business. His first printed book appeared in 1705, and in 1706 he began publishing his own newspaper Foligno. Following his death on 9 January 1743, his daughter Maria continued the business under his name. (Note: National Library Service of Italy: ICCU BVE0270210)

=== Later newspapers ===
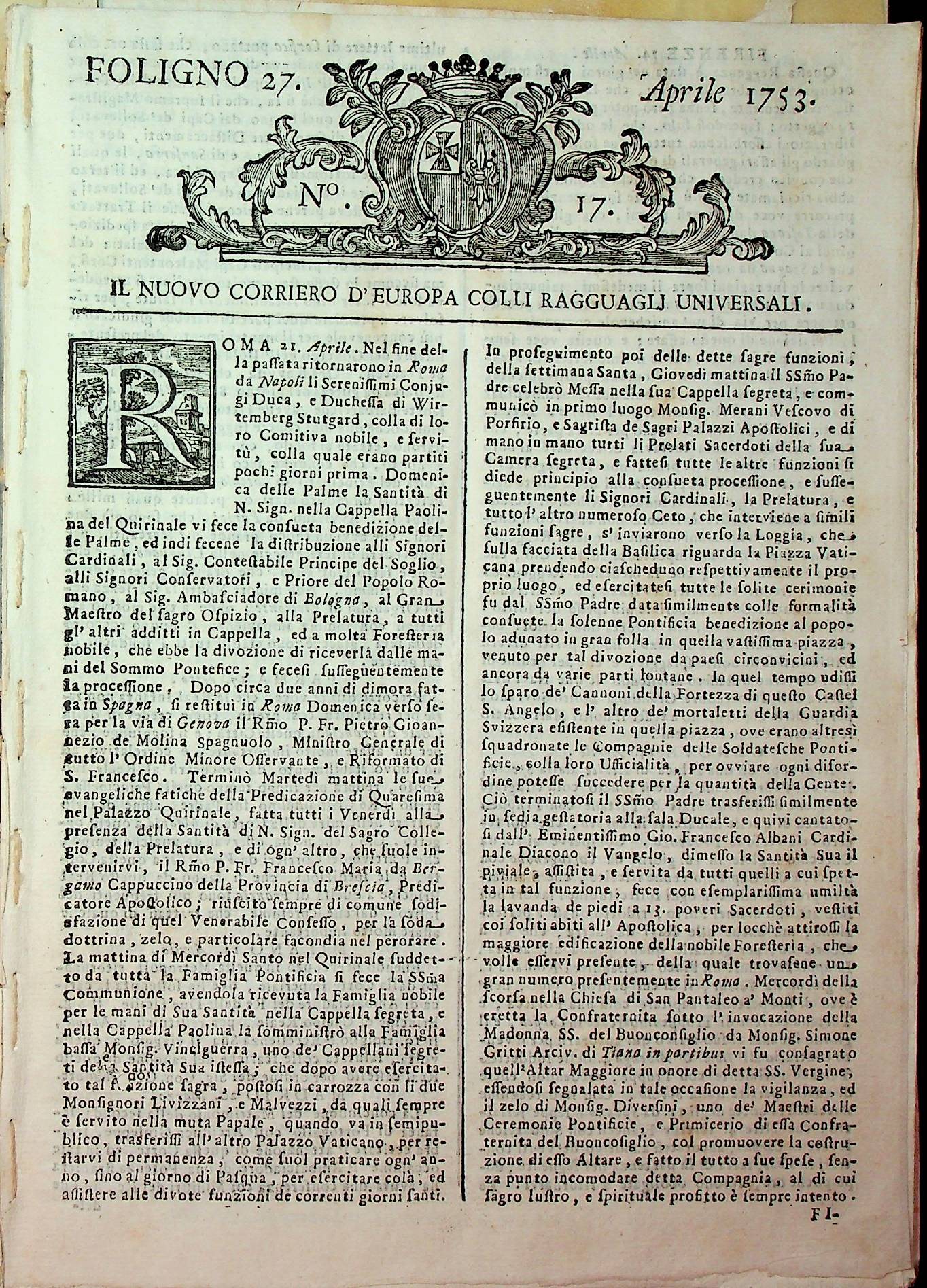
Corriere Neutrale d'Europa.

- Corriere Neutrale d'Europa coi Ragguagli Universali (1753–1795): Beginning in 1753, Francesco Fofi published his newspaper Foligno, expanding its title to Il Nuovo Corriere Neutrale d’Europa colli Ragguagli Universali. In 1787, the newspaper dropped the Foligno name and was rebranded as Corriere Neutrale d’Europa coi Ragguagli Universali. The publication, consisting of eight pages in two columns, is particularly notable for its coverage of the French Revolution.
- Gazzetta Universale (1775–1871): Maria Campana, daughter of printer Pompeo Campana, launched Gazzetta Universale in 1775, continuing to use her father’s name in the publication. The first known issue featured eight pages in a small format (19×13 cm). This newspaper should not be confused with the Gazzetta Universale printed in Florence by Giuseppe Pagani, which was founded in 1776. The last issue printed in Foligno appeared on 22 August 1783, after which publication moved to Assisi. From 3 May 1788, the newspaper was printed under the name of Ottavio Sgariglia (Maria Campana’s son), who published it twice a week. Following Sgariglia’s death in 1799, the newspaper’s editorship passed to Giovanni Tomassini (husband of Rosa Campana, Maria’s daughter), who resumed weekly publication in Foligno. The Tomassini family continued printing Gazzetta Universale until 31 December 1871
- Notizie del Mondo (1776–1805): In 1776, Francesco Campitelli launched a newspaper with a new format under the title Notizie del Mondo. This publication should not be confused with newspapers of the same name printed in Venezia and Florence. Notizie del Mondo remained in print until at least 1805, though it was less successful than Gazzetta Universale (Note: National Library Service of Italy: ICCU VEA0077595)

== Diario Ordinario (1716–1848) ==
First published in Rome by the Chracas family in 1716, Diario Ordinario, later known as Il Chracas and from 1808 as Diario di Roma, became a significant periodical. Its coverage of political, cultural, and artistic news makes it an essential source for historical research on Rome during this era. Between 1755 and 1797, issues with even numbers featured news from Rome and Italy, while odd-numbered issues contained foreign news. The publication was compact, measuring approximately 12x6 cm, with each issue containing up to 36 pages. The periodicity was irregular, reaching up to three issues per week.

The name Diario Ordinario was first adopted in 1718; before that, the publication was titled Diario Ordinario d’Ungheria. It remained in circulation until 1848, with two notable interruptions: during the Roman Republic and from 1809 to 1814. The Casanatense Library houses a complete online collection of this newspaper. (Note: Online collection of Diario Ordinario)

== Other newspapers of 18th century ==
=== Pesaro: Nuove da diverse corti e paesi principali d’Europa, Gazzetta di Pesaro (1737–1760) ===
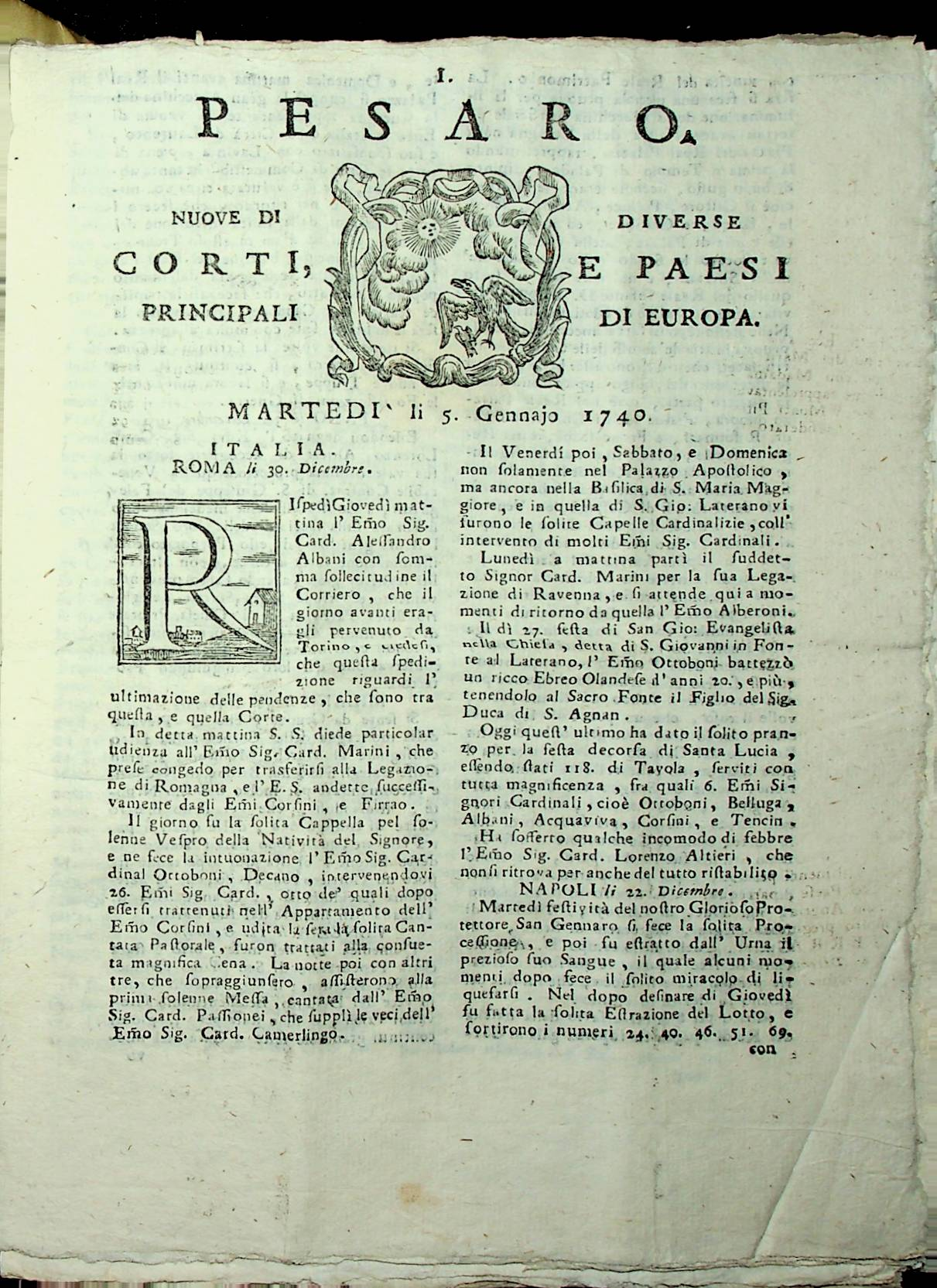
Pesaro. Nuove da diverse corti e paesi.

The newspaper titled Pesaro, with the additional subtitle Nuove da diverse corti e paesi principali d’Europa, was published in Pesaro by Niccolò Gavelli (1701–1777). (Note: Niccolò Gavelli was born in Pesaro on 31 March 1701, son of Giovanni, a printer in the town. In 1735, he purchased the printing house previously owned by Demetrio Degni for 328 Roman scudos, so becoming the official printer of both the bishopric and public administration. He died in Pesaro on 13 August 1777. While Gavelli’s son Agostino did not pursue typography, his nephews Gaetano and Nicola carried on the family trade.) The Pesaro newspaper covered news from across Europe while also reporting local affairs. The earliest surviving issue is dated 20 August 1737. (Note: National Library Service of Italy: ICCU UBO1431580)

In 1760, Gavelli revamped the publication under the new title Gazzetta di Pesaro. It featured a format of 15×21 cm, with two columns spanning eight pages. Occasionally, it had an additional four-page supplement covered single-subject news or reports from specific cities. Rich in musical news as well, Gazzetta di Pesaro was printed from 6 January 1761 until 1809. The newspaper covered Italy and the rest of Europe, though from 1789, its coverage of Roman news diminished, while reports from France became more prominent. Like most newspapers of the time, it was sold via annual subscriptions, priced at 10 paoli. The number of subscribers is estimated to have been around 800. (Note: National Library Service of Italy: ICCU TO00184768)

=== Notizie Politiche (printed in Cesena, 1788–1797) ===
Founded in 1788 by Jesuit Juan de Osuna, who had turned to journalism after the suppression of the Society of Jesus, this newspaper was printed twice weekly in Cesena, the town of Pope Pius VI who used to read this newspaper. The printer was Gregorio Biasini until 22 April 1788, after which his heirs continued the publication. It was also sold in Rome and Bologna, with an annual subscription costing 18 paoli. With a strong anti-encyclopedic and anti-revolutionary stance, Notizie Politiche quickly gained popularity and it ceased publication only in 1797, after the Napoleonic army entered in the town. (Note: National Library Service of Italy: ICCU TO01628667)

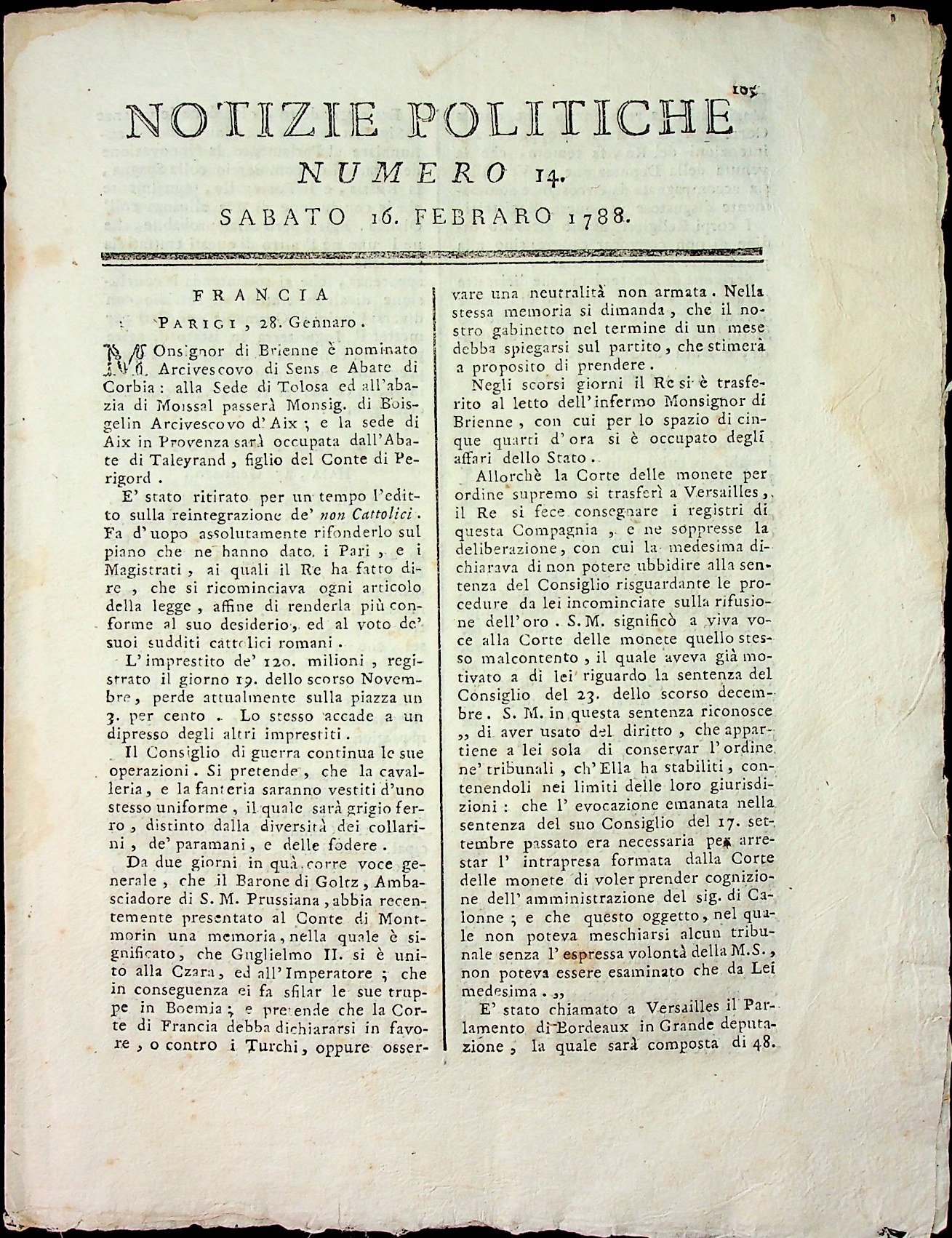
Notizie Politiche (printed in Rome).

=== Notizie Politiche (printed in Rome, 1788–1790) ===
This newspaper marked the beginning of modern political journalism in Rome, becoming the second newspaper printed in the city. It was in circulation from 2 January 1788 to 28 August 1790 under the full title Notizie politiche: o sia istoria de’ più famosi avvenimenti del mondo. Founded by Francesco Zacchiroli, the newspaper was taken over in 1789 by Francesco Becattini.

With a strong Jacobin perspective, it openly challenged censorship and supported the ideals of the French Revolution, though it downplayed instances of rioting. By August 1790, increasing pressure led to Becattini’s arrest and exile, forcing the newspaper to shut down. The publication consisted of eight pages and was issued twice weekly. (Note: National Library Service of Italy: ICCU RAV0261443)

=== Minor newspapers ===
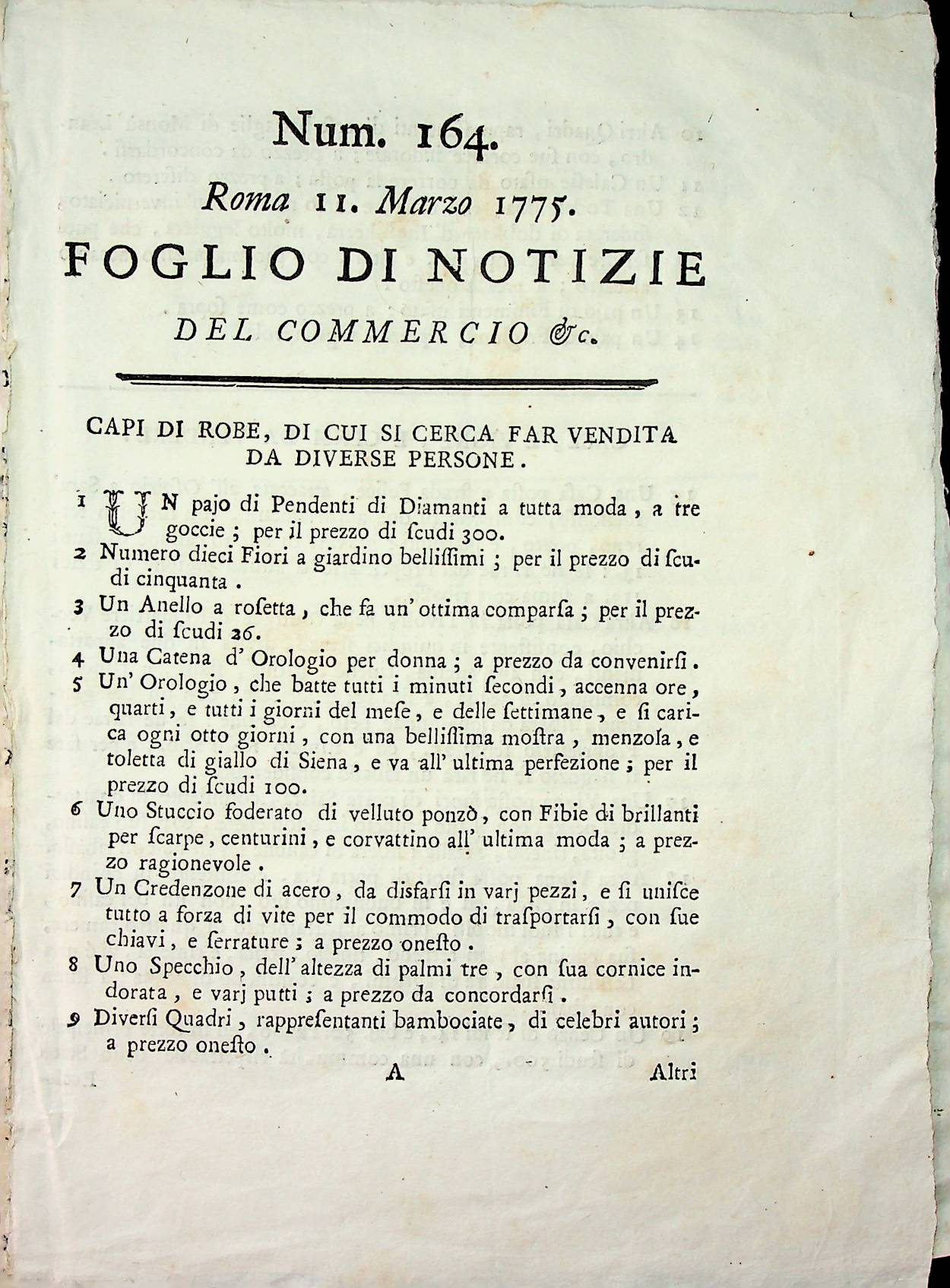
Foglio di Notizie.

Several smaller newspapers were printed in the Papal States in the latter half of the 18th century, though their limited print runs have left few surviving copies, making their editorial history difficult to reconstruct.

- Ravenna (1716–1774): printed every Tuesday by Antonio Maria Landi. Well-preserved copies are held in the Biblioteca Classense. (Note: National Library Service of Italy: ICCU RAV1512769) It was followed in 1774 by Gazzetta di Ravenna, edited by Antonio Roveri. (Note: National Library Service of Italy: ICCU RAV1513715)
- Faenza: Avvenimenti universali di varj stati e corti di Europa (1757–1761): a weekly publication printed in Faenza by Benedetti Printers. (Note: National Library Service of Italy: ICCU RAV1510330)
- Gazzetta di Forlì (1768–1774): printed by Achille Marozzi in Forlì, it became subject to a new censorship system involving three different authorities.
- Foglio di Notizie del commercio (1772–1775): published in Rome by Casaletti Printers, this classified magazine featured advertisements for sales, services, and job searches, as well as information on ship arrivals and departures in Rome’s port.
- Gazzetta della Marca (1785): a local newspaper printed in Macerata by Antonio Cortesi and Bartolomeo Capitani. The only known issues date 11 and 18 November 1785.
