= Giulio (coin) =

Currency of the papal states

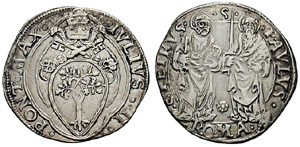
Pope Julius II della Rovere (1503-1513)
Della Rovere arms within quatrefoil. IVLIVS II PONT. MAX.	Ss. Paul and Peter standing facing; rosette between. S. PETRVS. S. PAVLUS. in exergue: ROMA.
AR Giulio (3,29 g). Roman mint

The Giulio was a papal coin with a value of 2 grossi.

== History ==
The name came from Pope Julius II (r. 1503-13) who had increased it in weight and intrinsic in 1504. By order of 20 July 1504 the Pope established: "Reformetur stampae monetariae pro ducatis, carlenis, bononiensis etc. Cogitetur de cunio monetae si posset reduci Urbs ad monetam papalem exclusa forensi etc.". The carleni (or carlini) were then reformed and changed their name to giuli, so as to distinguish them from the previous ones. They contained an abundant 4 grams of silver. Their value thus became one third higher than the pontifical carlino. A few years later, in 1508, the silver content had already fallen below 4 grams. In 1535 there was a further reduction to 3.65 grams. The first minting of Julius II bore the papal arms on the obverse and the saints Peter and Paul on the reverse.

In 1540 Paul III coined the coins with 3.85 grams of fine which took the name of paoli. The name of giulio was also used by other papal mints and some Italian ones. The papal giulio of Bologna was forged in Masserano by a Fieschi before 1597. This coin weighed only 3.4 grams.

The last coin minted with this name was the silver giulio struck by Pius VII in 1817; it weighed 2,642 g and had a title of 917/1000. It was still worth 2 grossi or 10 baiocchi. The names of paolo and giulio were in use in Rome, even when these coins were no longer in circulation, to indicate the 20 baiocchi coin.

== See also ==
- History of coins in Italy
