= Paolo (coin) =

Coin of the Papal States

Pope Paul III (1534–1549)
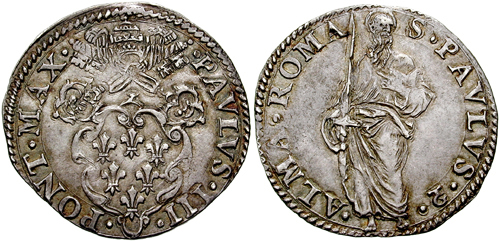
First side of the image: Farnese coat of arms inside rococo frame surmounted by decussate keys and tiara. Around PAVLVS•III• •PONT•MAX•
Second side of the image: Saint Paul standing in front, holding a sword pointed upwards. Around S•PAVLVS•(mint mark)• •ALMA•ROMA
AR Paolo (3,85 g). Mint of Rome

The Paolo or Paulo was a pontifical coin; this name was given to the giulio by 2 grossi when in 1540 Pope Paul III (hence its name) made it increase its silver content to 3.85 g.

== History ==
The first minting of Paul III bore the papal arms on the obverse and St. Paul on the reverse. At the time of the arrival of the French revolutionaries, a paolo was valued on the Milanese market with the value of 14 soldi. In Rome in the nineteenth century it was the popular name of the 10 baiocchi coin. The names of paolo and giulio remained in use in Rome until the pontificate of Pius IX, even when these coins were no longer in circulation, to indicate the 10 baiocchi coin. The same name took coins from other Italian states. In the Grand Duchy of Tuscany circulated the paolo of 8 crazie.

== See also ==
- History of coins in Italy
