= Lira =

Monetary unit of a number of countries

Coordinates: 2°14′N 32°54′E

100 Italian lira (1979, FAO celebration)
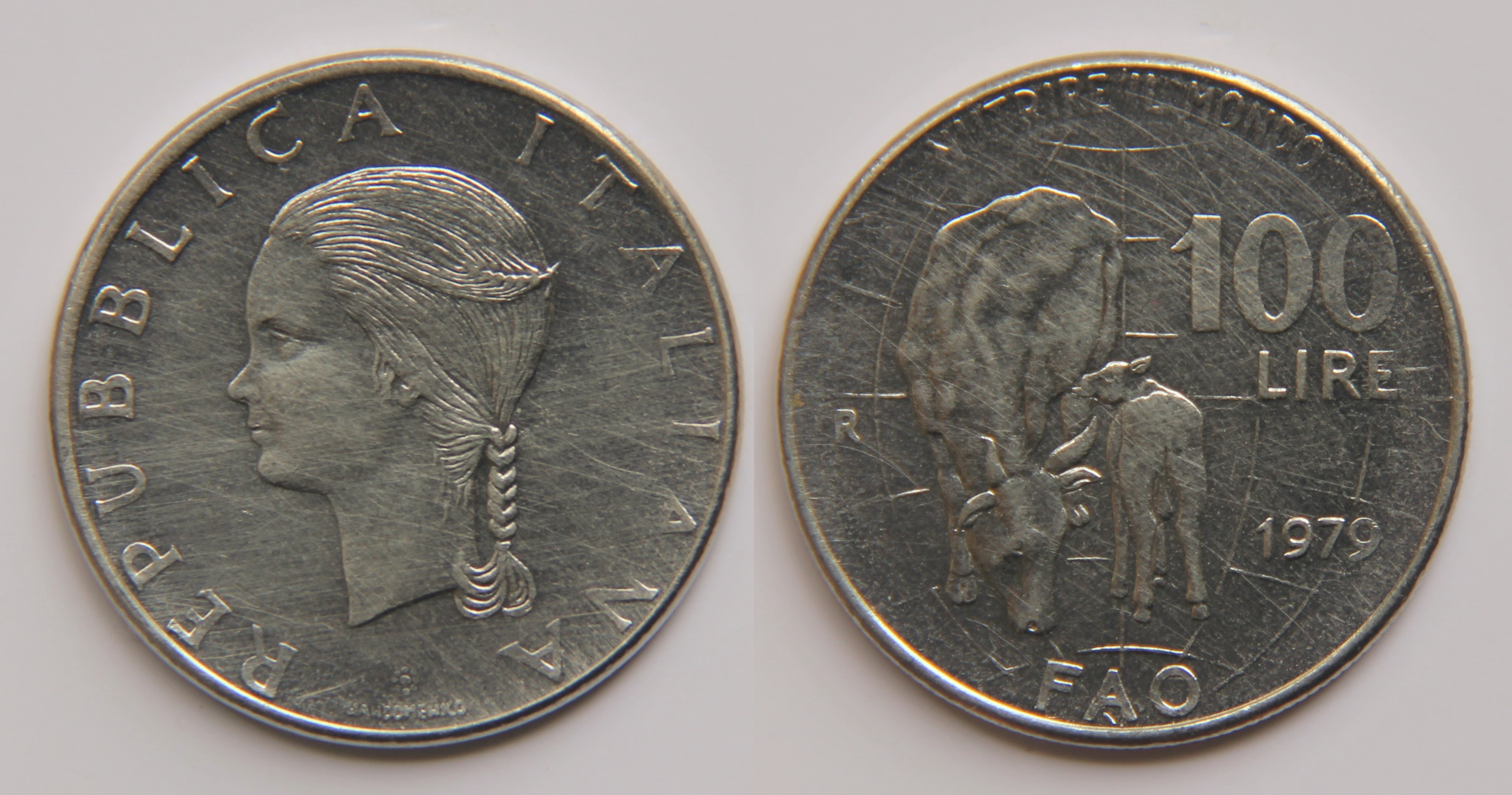
First side of the image: Obverse: Young woman with braid facing left and Repubblica Italiana [Italian Republic] written in Italian.
Second side of the image: Reverse: Cow nursing calf, face value & date. FAO at bottom and Nutrire il Mondo [Feed the world] at top.
Coin minted by Italy in 1970s to celebrate and promote the Food and Agriculture Organization.
1 Turkish lira (2009)
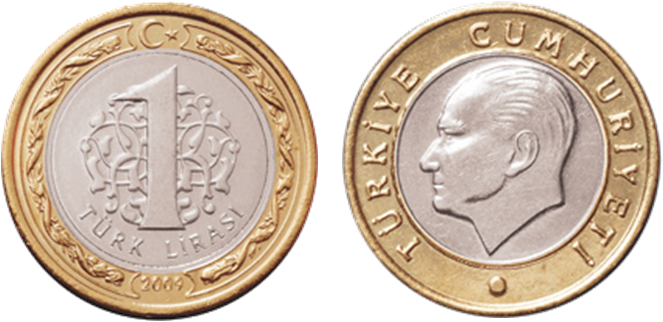
First side of the image:
Second side of the image: Obverse: Mustafa Kemal Atatürk with TÜRKİYE CUMHURİYETİ [Republic of Turkey] lettering
1 Italian lira (1863)
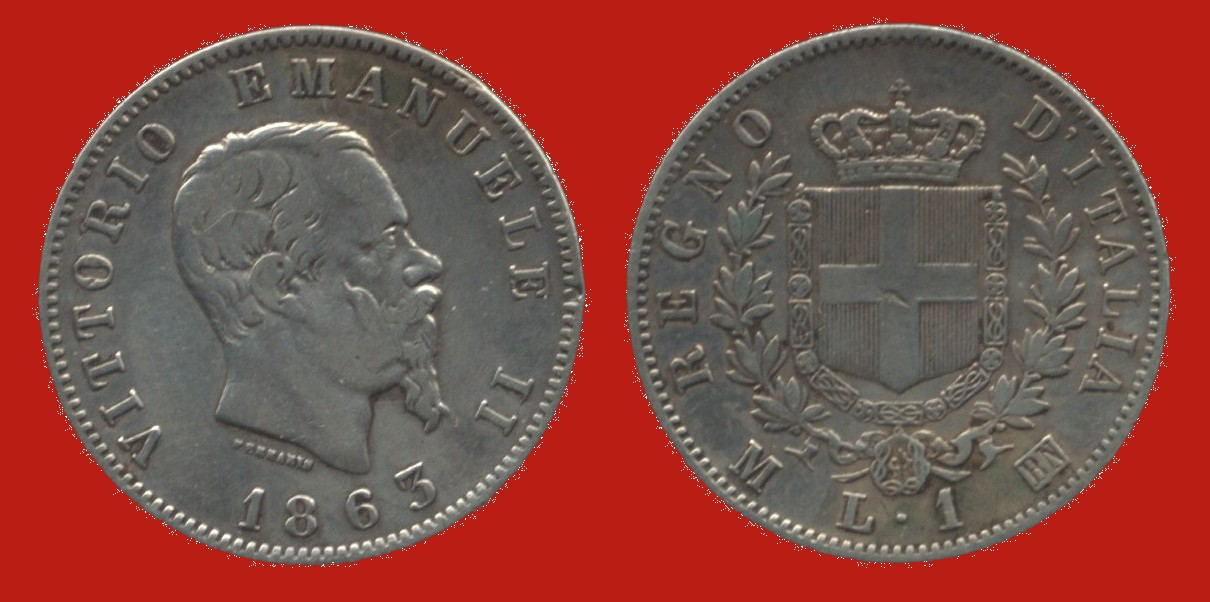
First side of the image: Obverse: Victor Emmanuel II
Second side of the image: Reverse: Coat of arms of the House of Savoy
10 Turkish lira (1986)
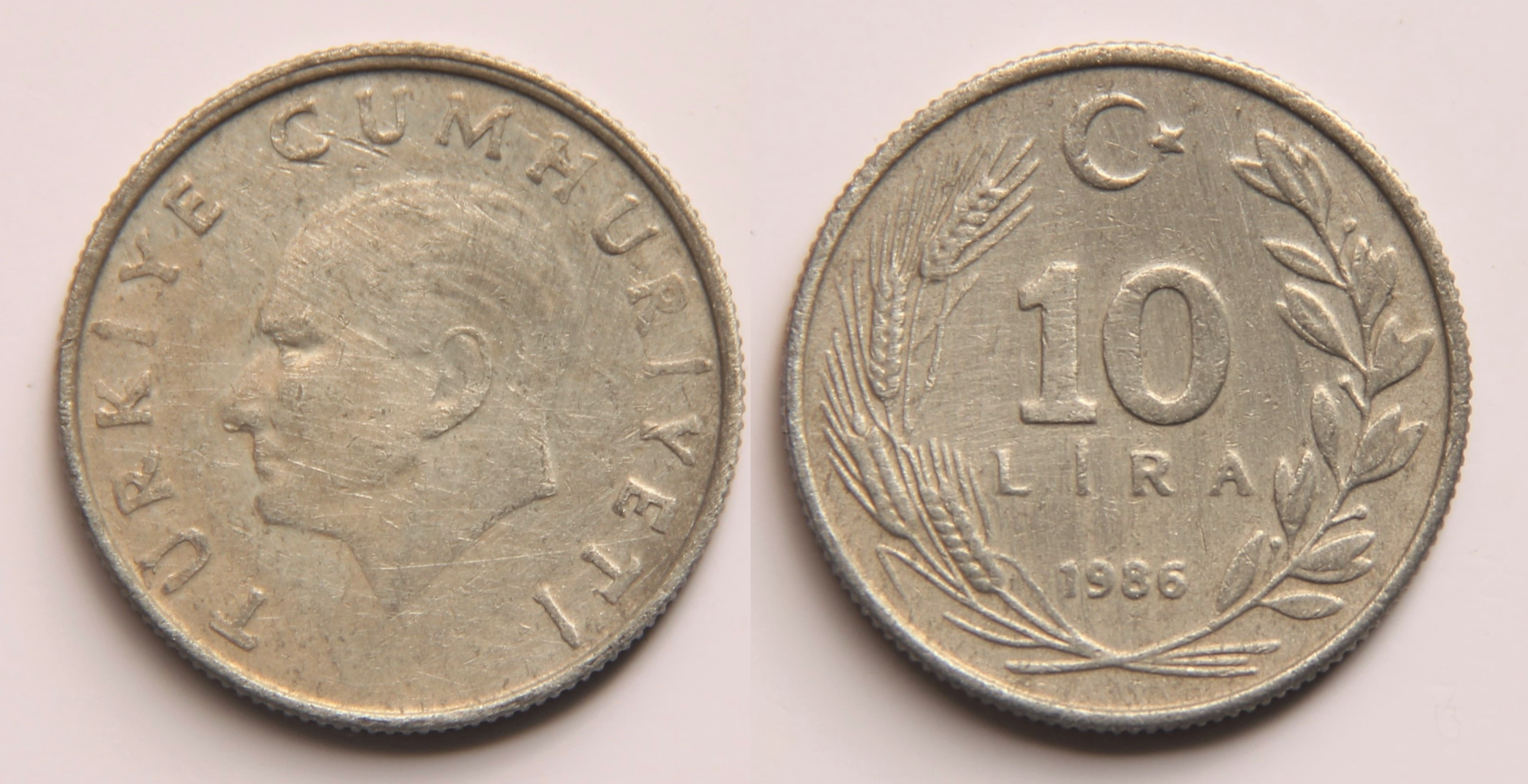
First side of the image: Obverse: Mustafa Kemal Atatürk with TÜRKİYE CUMHURİYETİ lettering
Second side of the image: Reverse: Face value and year within wreath, crescent moon and star at the top. Crescent opens right. Also an olive branch for symbol of peace and ear for Anatolia.

Lira is the name of several currency units. It is the current currency of Turkey and also the local name of the currencies of Lebanon and of Syria. It is also the name of several former currencies, including those of Italy, Malta and Israel. The term originates from the value of a Roman pound (Latin: libra, about 329g, 10.58 troy ounces) of high purity silver. The libra was the basis of the monetary system of the Roman Empire. When Europe resumed a monetary system, during the Carolingian Empire, the Roman system was adopted. The Roman denominations librae, solidi, denarii were used (becoming known in England as £sd).

Specifically, this system was kept during the Middle Ages and Modern Age in England, France, and Italy. In each of these countries the libra was translated into local language: pound in England, livre in France, lira in Italy. The Venetian lira was one of the currencies in use in Italy and due to the economic power of the Venetian Republic a popular currency in the Eastern Mediterranean trade.

During the 19th century, the Ottoman Empire and the Eyalet of Egypt adopted the lira as their national currency, equivalent to 100 piasters or kuruş. When the Ottoman Empire collapsed between 1918 and 1922, many of the successor states retained the lira as their national currency. In some countries, such as Cyprus, which have belonged to both the Ottoman Empire and the British Empire, the words lira and pound are used interchangeably.

== Lira sign ==
For the Turkish lira, the Turkish lira sign (U+20BA ₺ TURKISH LIRA SIGN) is used. The Lebanese lira uses £L (before numerals) or L.L. (after numerals) in Latin and ل.ل. in Arabic. The Syrian lira uses £S (before numerals) or L.S. (after numerals) in Latin and ل.س in Arabic.

The Italian lira had no official sign, but the abbreviations L. and Lit. and the symbols ₤ (two bars), £ (one bar) were all commonly used.

The Maltese lira used £M before 1986 and Lm thereafter (both as prefixes), though £M continued to be used in unofficial capacities.

The Unicode system allocated U+20A4 ₤ LIRA SIGN to the Italian lira, to provide compatibility with a legacy HP character set. As with U+00A3 £ POUND SIGN, where the one-bar and the two-bar versions are treated as allographs and the choice between them is merely stylistic, no evidence has been found that either style predominated in Italy or anywhere else.

== Current uses ==
=== Turkey ===
The Turkish lira was introduced in 1844 during the Ottoman reign. The Turkish lira is now the currency of Turkey and the Turkish Republic of Northern Cyprus, and used in Turkish-occupied northern Syria.

=== Lebanon and Syria ===
The Lebanese pound and Syrian pound are both called "lira" (ليرة) in Arabic, the national language of both Lebanon and Syria.

== Historic use ==
=== Italy ===
The lira was the currency of Italy from its unification until it was merged into the euro in 1999. As a unit of currency, the lira had previously been used in some of the states and possessions that became Italy but their values were not necessarily equivalent. (See Luccan lira, Papal lira, Parman lira, Sardinian lira and Tuscan lira.)

== Former currencies named lira ==
- Cypriot lira/pound 1879–2007; merged into the euro, 2008
- French livre 781–1794; became the French franc
- Israeli lira/pound 1948–1980; replaced by the old shekel in 1980.
- Italian lira 1861–2002; merged into the euro, 1999 (notes and coins from 2002)
- Italian East African lira 1938–1941; supplanted by the East African shilling
- Italian Somaliland lira 1925–1926; replaced by the Italian East African lira
- Luccan lira until 1800 and 1826–1847; merged into the Italian lira
- Maltese lira 1825–2007; merged into the euro, 2008
- Neapolitan lira 1812–1813; merged into the Italian lira
- Ottoman lira 1844–1923; became the Turkish lira
- Papal lira 1866–1870; became the Vatican lira at par with the Italian lira
- Parman lira before 1802 and 1815–1859; merged into the Italian lira
- Sammarinese lira 1860s–2002; merged into the euro
- Sardinian lira 1816–1861; merged into the Italian lira
- Tripolitanian lira 1943–1951; replaced by the Libyan pound
- Tuscan lira until 1807 and 1814–1826; merged into the Italian lira
- Vatican lira 1929–2002; merged into the euro
- Venetian lira 1472–1807; merged into the Italian lira

== See also ==
- Pound (currency), the linguistic equivalent of the word "lira" in English.
- Lira sign, which varies by currency, as does its status
