= Roman scudo =

Currency of the Papal States until 1866

Scudo romano (Italian)
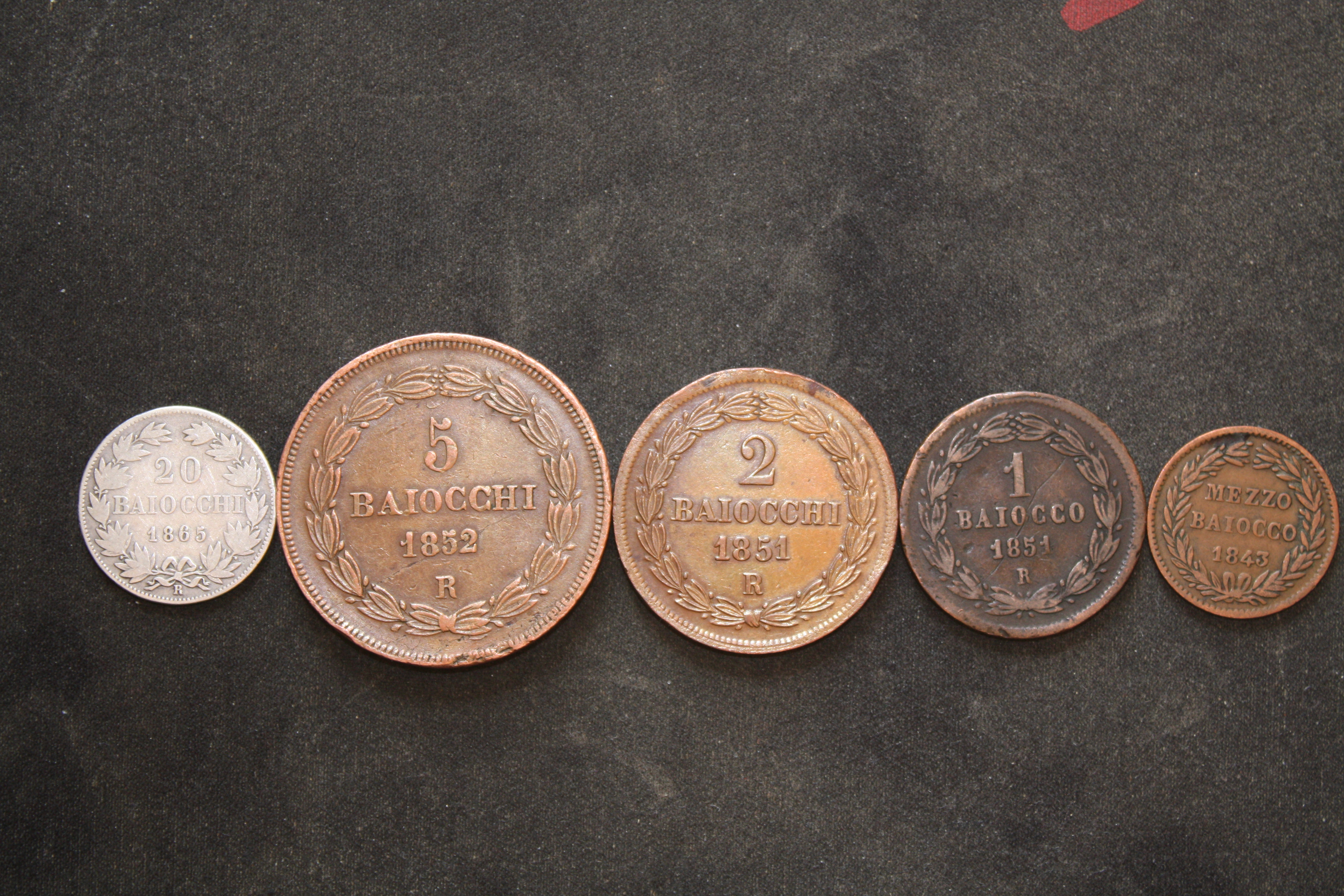
- Various denominations, largest is 40 mm

Units of account
- Plural: scudi
- Subunit
- 1/100: baiocco
- 1/500: quattrino
- Plural
- baiocco: baiocchi
- quattrino: quattrini

Denominations
- Coins: 1 quattrino, 1/2, 1, 2, 5, 10, 20, 50 baiocchi, 1 scudo
- Rarely used: 2 1/2, 5, 10 scudi

Demographics
- Date of withdrawal: 1866
- Replaced by: Papal lira
- User(s): Papal States (Note: Even during its revolutionary periods: Roman Republic (18th century) and Roman Republic (19th century).)

Issuance
- Mint: Papal Mint

Valuation
- Inflation: abd
- This infobox shows the latest status before this currency was rendered obsolete.

The Roman scudo (plural: scudi romani) was the currency of the Papal States until 1866. It was subdivided into 100 baiocchi (singular: baiocco), each of 5 quattrini (singular: quattrino). Other denominations included the grosso of 5 baiocchi, the carlino of 7 1/2 baiocchi, the giulio and paoli; both of 10 baiocchi, the testone of 30 baiocchi and the doppia of 3 scudi.

== History ==
In addition to issues for the Papal States as a whole, the currency was also issued by many of the individual municipalities. In the late 18th century, this included issues from Ancona, Ascoli, Bologna, Civitavecchia, Fano, Fermo, Foligno, Gubbio, Macerata, Matelica, Montalto, Pergola, Perugia, Ronciglione, San Severino, Spoleto, Terni, Tivoli and Viterbo. Uniquely in Bologna the baiocco, also known as the bolognino, was subdivided into 6 quattrini.

Sede vacante
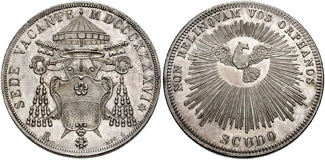
First side of the image: SEDE VACANTE MDCCCXXXXVI, cardinal Riario-Sforza coat-of-arms surmounted by canopy, crossed keys, and cardinal's cap; R (mint) and NIC C (Niccolò Cerbara, engraver) in exergue
Second side of the image: NON RELINQVAM VOS ORPHANOS, SCUDO in exergue, radiate dove flying facing, head right.
AR Scudo (26.98 g). Dated 1846.

Between 1798 and 1799, the revolutionary French forces established the Roman Republic, which issued coins denominated in baiocco and scudo. In addition, the municipalities of Ancona, Civitavecchia, Clitunno, Foligno, Gubbio, Pergola and Perugia issued coins in the name of the Roman Republic.

In 1808, the Papal States were annexed by France, and the French franc circulated officially. When the Pope's authority was restored in 1814, the scudo was restored as the currency. However, outside Rome solely the coinage of Bologna was resumed. In 1849, another Roman Republic was established which issued coins centrally and in Ancona.

In 1866, the scudo was replaced by the Papal lira, equivalent to the Italian lira, when the Papal States joined the Latin Monetary Union. The exchange rate used was 5.375 lire = 1 scudo.

== Coins ==
Pius VII (1800 - 1823)
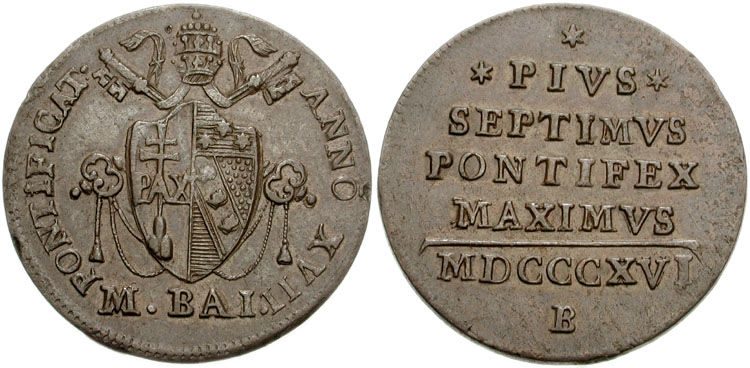
First side of the image: Papal coat-of-arms. around PONTIFICAT. ANNO XVII. In exergue M. BAI.
Second side of the image: Legend PIVS / SEPTIMVS / PONTIFEX / MAXIMVS. Date: MDCCCXVI (1816) and mintmark. (B)
Æ Half Baiocco (27mm, 5.80 g). Bologna mint. Dated RY 17, AD 1816.
Roman Republic (1849)
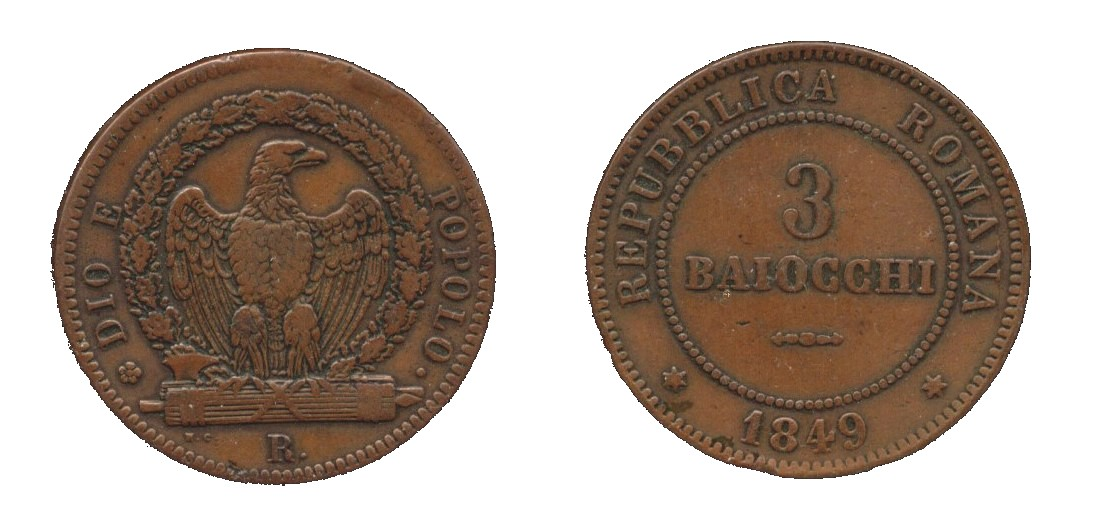
First side of the image: Eagle on fasces. DIO E POPOLO. Mint mark (R)
Second side of the image: Value. REPUBBLICA ROMANA Date: 1849
Æ 3 baiocchi. Rome mint

In the late eighteenth century, coins were issued in copper in denominations of 1 quattrino, 1/2, 1, 2, 2 1/2 and 5 baiocchi, along with billon coins for 1, 4, 8, 12, 25 and 50 baiocchi, 1 and 2 carlini, silver coins for 1 grosso, 1 and 2 giulio, 1 testone and 1 scudo, and gold coins for 1/2 and 1 zecchino and 1 and 2 doppia. The individual states issued similar coinages, with the exception of Bologna, which additionally issued silver 12 baiocchi, 1/2 scudo and 80 bolognini, and gold 2, 5 and 10 zecchini. The 1798 to 1799 Roman Republic issued copper 1/2, 1, 2 and 5 baiocchi and silver 1 scudo.

After the restoration of the currency, billon coins were no longer issued and several other denominations disappeared. There were copper 1 quattrino, 1/2 and 1 baiocco, silver 1 grosso, 1 and 2 giulio and 1 scudo, and gold 1 doppia. The silver testone was reintroduced in 1830, followed by 50 baiocchi in 1832.

In 1835, a new coinage was introduced which abandoned all the denomination names except for the quattrino, baiocco and scudo. Copper coins were issued in denominations of 1 quattrino, 1/2 and 1 baiocco, with silver 5, 10, 20, 30 and 50 baiocchi and 1 scudo, and gold 2 1/2, 5 and 10 scudi. In 1849, the Roman Republic issued a coinage consisting of copper 1/2, 1 and 3 baiocchi and silver 4, 8, 16 and 40 baiocchi. Following the restoration of the Papal States, copper 2 and 5 baiocchi were introduced.

== Banknotes ==
From 1785, paper money was issued by the Santo Monte Della Pietà di Roma in denominations from 3 scudi up to 1500 scudi, while, from 1786, the Banco di Santo Spirito di Roma issued notes from 3 scudi up to 3000 scudi. The 1798 to 1799 Roman Republic issued notes in various denominations including 3 and 40 baiocchi, 8, 9 and 10 paoli. The treasury of the Papal States issued notes during the 19th century.

== See also ==
- Papal mint
- Maltese scudo
- Escudo
- History of coins in Italy
