= Bologna (newspaper) =

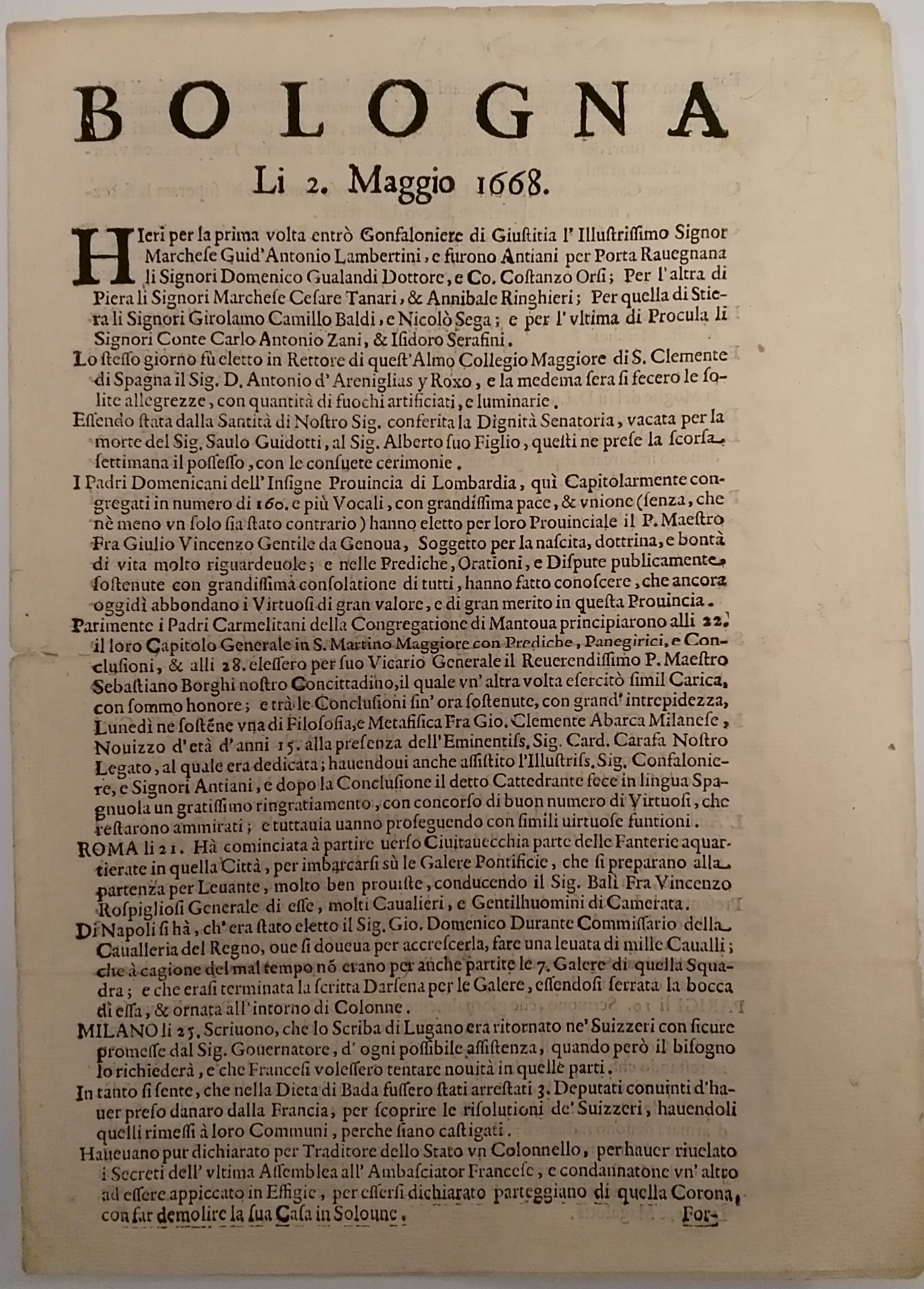
- an issue of 1668
- Founder: Lorenzo Pellegrini
- Founded: 1642
- Ceased publication: June 1787
- Language: Italian
- City: Bologna

Bologna was a newspaper published in Bologna from 1642 to 1787. It is considered one of the oldest newspapers in Italy.

== History ==
Bologna was the first gazette published in the city of Bologna. The first known number still in existence is dated 28 June 1642, (Note: The number dated 28 June 1642, along with others, is kept in the Vatican Library, shelfmark Barberini.Q.II.46.) but it is probable that the printing started some months before. The founder and publisher up to 1658 was Lorenzo Pellegrini, (Note: Lorenzo Pellegrini or Peregrini was born in 1605. Since 1636 he worked as a notary and he died in Bologna on 25 October 1685) and the first typographer was Nicolò Tebaldini. On 23 October 1643 Pellegrini obtained by the Senate of Bologna the formal privilege of publishing, but this authorization was questioned by the Papal legate (governor). On the 24 March 1646 the Bologna obtained the final formal privilege to be published.

Tebaldini died on 14 March 1646 and it was followed as typographer by Giovanni Battista Ferroni. In January 1660 the printer and publisher became Giacomo Monti. (Note: Giacomo Monti was born in Bologna on 24 July 1600 and died there on 30 March 1687) He was succeeded by his sons Antonio Maria and Pier Maria. After the death of Antonio Maria on 16 April 1689 the newspaper Bologna changed the name of the publisher printed in the last page from Giacomo Monti to Pier Maria Monti. Following the establishment of the newspaper Bologna, newspapers in the Papal States proliferated throughout the 17th century, with numerous other publications emerging to meet the increasing demand for news and information.

In this time the newspaper Bologna was issued weekly usually on Saturday. It was of four pages in a double format compared to a book (about A4 paper size), it contained news from Italy and abroad.

On 14 December 1708 the publisher became Giovanni Antonio Saffi. Since the first number of 1709, the format of the page changed from a column to two columns.

On 2 January 1788 the Saffi discontinued the Bologna and in its place published a new newspaper, the Gazzetta di Bologna, reducing the size of the page and using eight pages. From July 1788 it became biweekly, published on Wednesdays and Saturdays. The Gazzetta di Bologna lasted till June 1797 when, under the Cisalpine Republic, the Saffi discontinued it for publishing another newspaper, the Monitore Bolognese, more aligned with the French.

== The news ==
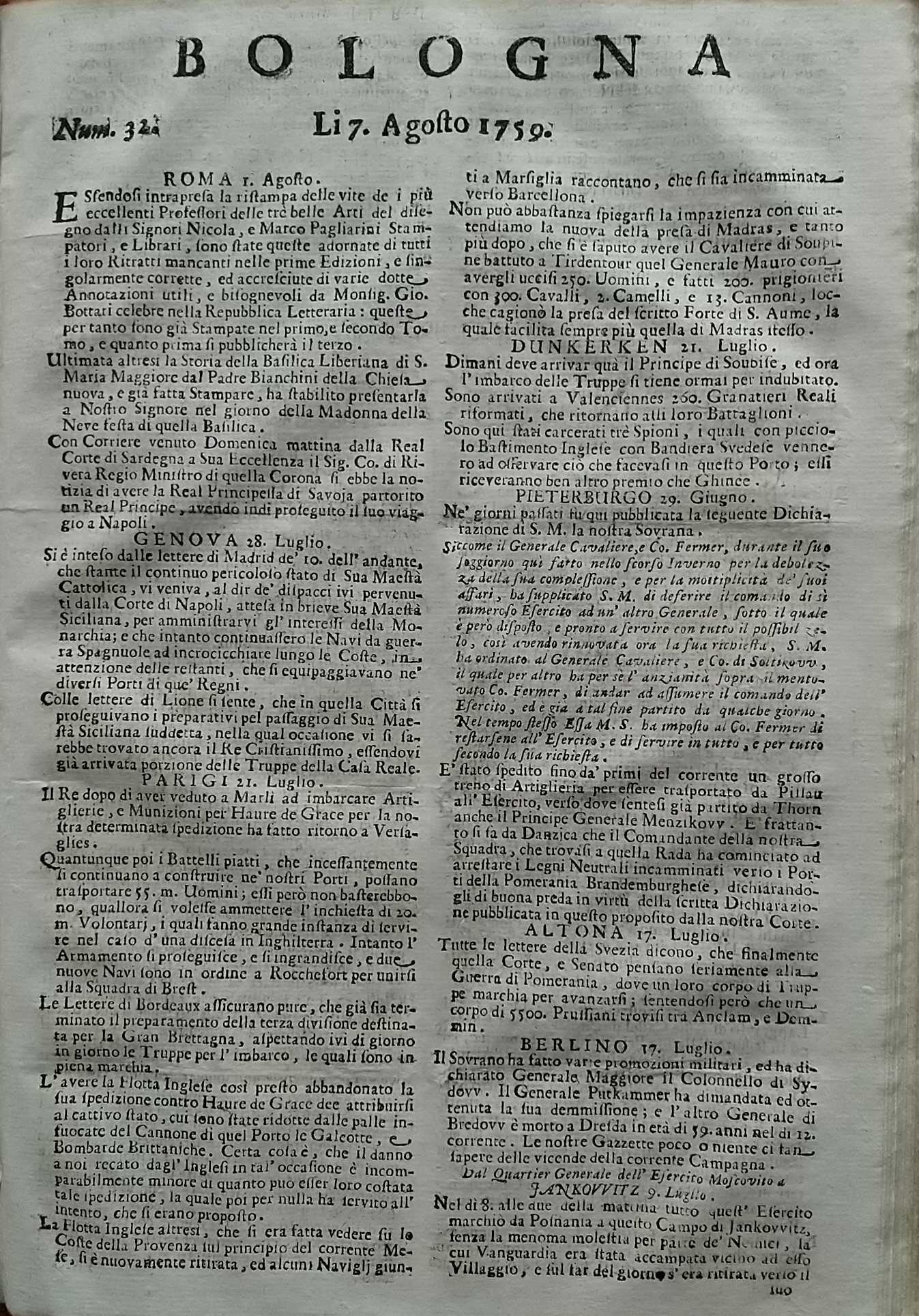
A number of 1759

In the seventeenth century Europe the postal network touched all the main countries. The correspondence to Bologna therefore came via the postal service. Probably, most of the news was provided by publishers of foreign capital newspapers. There was also a second network that included all the major newspapers: each of them provided the news they had on their own to the gazettes of the other countries. In this way you could make newspapers of good quality and with news already verified. In addition to these privileged sources, Bologna had its own network of local correspondents, who contributed to the newspaper on a voluntary basis. Like the other newspapers, it maintained an exclusive relationship with its correspondents.

The news were grouped by places of origin. The first information was local, followed by news from Rome. Then came news from other Italian states: Kingdom of Naples, Grand Duchy of Tuscany, Duchy of Milan, Republic of Genoa, Duchy of Savoy (always in the same order). The news from abroad came from: Madrid, Lisbon, Paris (occasionally from other French cities), Lucerne (and other Swiss cities, such as Bern and Geneva), Cologne (also Frankfurt, Argentorati and Hamburg), The Hague, Brussels, London, Vienna and Poland. Finally, news was published from Venice or from Mantua.

For each news, two information were given in a row: city of origin and date. The date was important because the news was published on different dates. The reader was used to reading news about events that happened at different times: one day before for Bologna, three days before for Venice, five or seven days before for Milan, up to ten days before for Rome. The news coming from abroad brought a date that was from a minimum of ten days (France and Switzerland) to a maximum of fifty days (Lisbon) before the day the newspaper came out.
