= Marzocco =

Heraldic lion and symbol of Florence

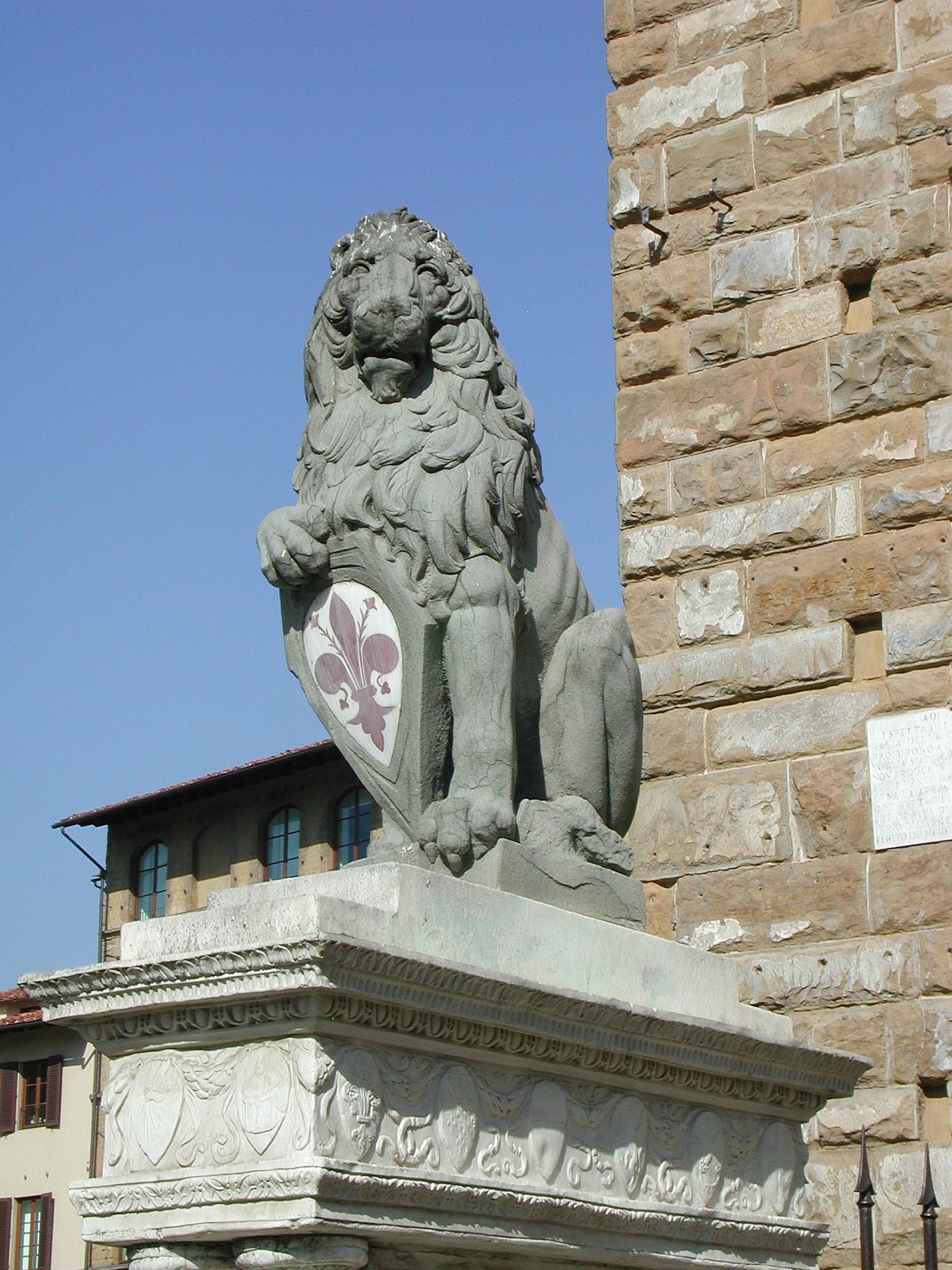
The Marzocco now in Piazza della Signoria, a replica of Donatello's

The Marzocco is the heraldic lion that is a symbol of Florence, and was apparently the first piece of public secular sculpture commissioned by the Republic of Florence, in the late 14th century. The lion stood at the heart of the city in the Piazza della Signoria at the end of the platform attached to the Palazzo Vecchio called the ringhiera, from which speakers traditionally harangued the crowd. This is now lost, having weathered with time to an unrecognizable mass of stone.

The best known rendition is by Donatello, made in 1418–20. Donatello’s Marzocco was placed in the Piazza della Signoria in 1812, but in 1885 it was moved to the Bargello, having been replaced by the copy we see to this day.

== The first Marzocco ==
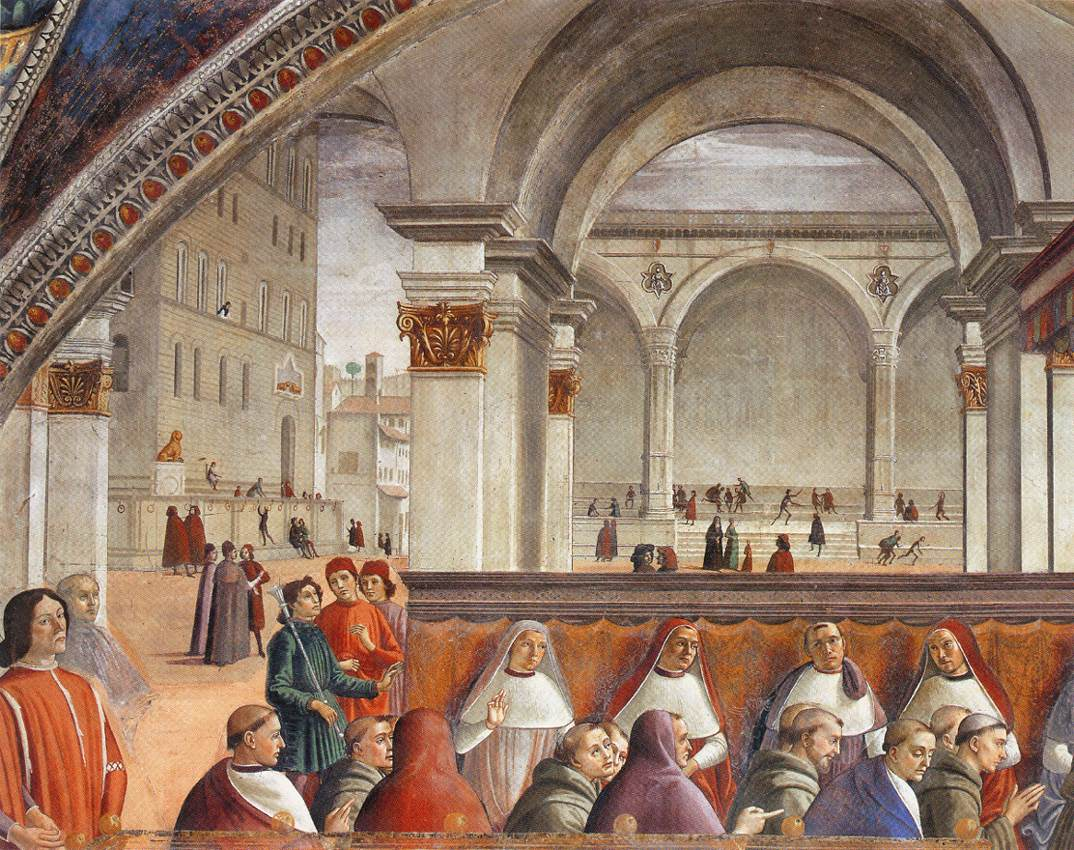
Domenico Ghirlandaio, Confirmation of the Rule (detail) - the original Marzocco can be seen on the corner of the palazzo in the background at left, 1480s.

The original that had stood since (perhaps) 1377, and is now lost, appears to have been similar to Donatello's in design, though it was fully gilded and may have crouched over a submissive wolf representing Florence's great rival Siena. It can be seen in the background of several paintings and prints, though by the time it was replaced it was so worn that (being only medieval, not classical) it was not considered worth keeping, and disappeared. About 1460 it was given a richly sculptural socle with double baluster-like motifs at the corners. The ringhiera, once a platform from which the Signoria addressed the people, then a focus for popular tumult, was removed at the same time as the statue was replaced by Donatello's on a pedestal in 1812.

=== Name ===
The obscure name Marzocco, unfathomable to some scholars, would by others derive from Marte (Mars), whose Roman statue, known as the "Roman God of War", noted by Dante and carried away by a flood of the Arno in 1333, had previously been Florence’s emblem. The lion is seated and with one paw supports the coat-of-arms of Florence, the fleur de lys called il giaggiolo, the iris. Marzocco was invoked in the Florentine battle cry and figures in Gentile Aretino's poem "Alla battaglia":

"San Giorgio, Marzoccho Marzoccho

suona percuoti, forbocta rintoccho
Palle palle, Marzoccho Marzoccho

legagli strecti e pon lor buona taglia!"

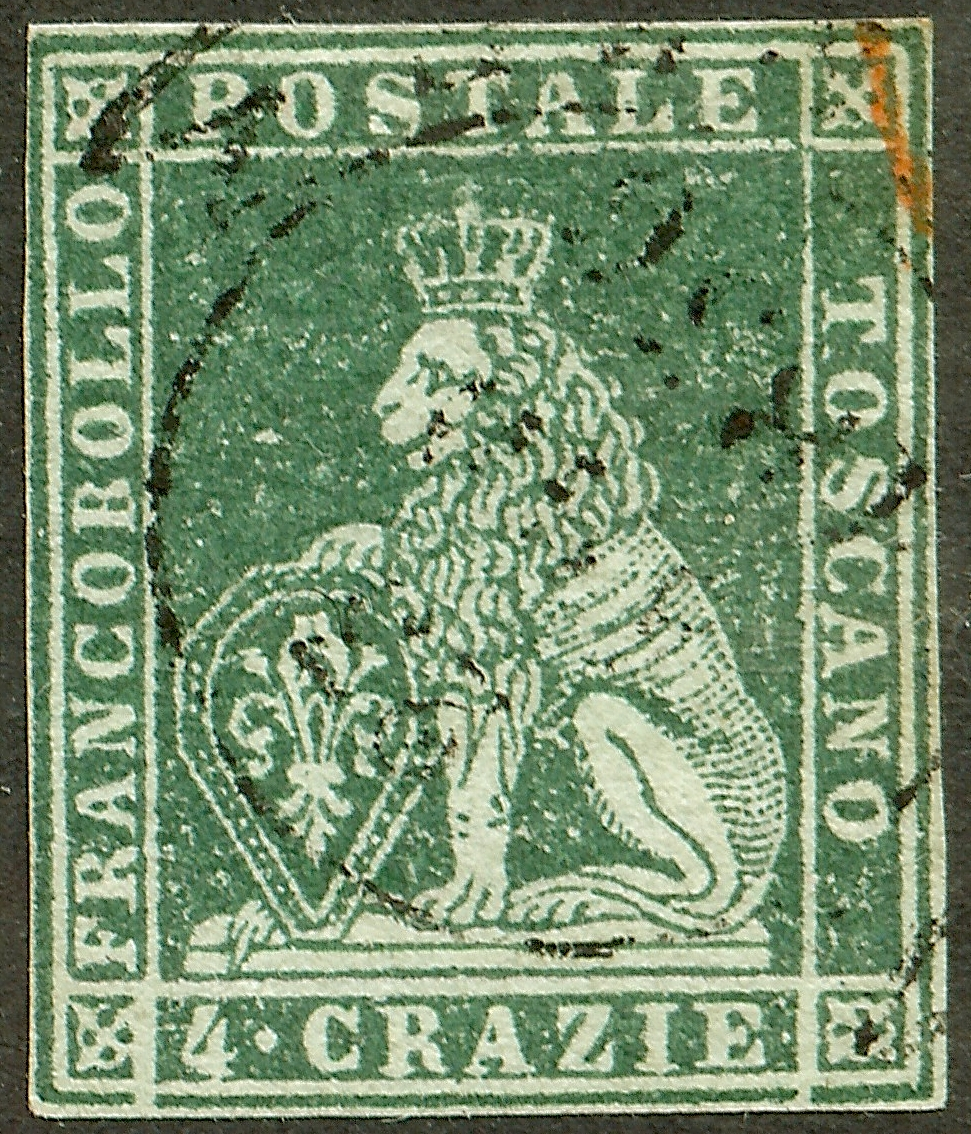
The Marzocco was crowned on Tuscany's first postage stamp, 1851.

=== Symbol ===
The Marzocco was such a powerful symbol of the Florentine Republic that the republican Florentine troops in the Siege of Florence (1529–1530) were known as marzoccheschi, "sons of the Marzocco", and pro-Medici besiegers of the city in 1530 held a funeral and ritually buried a representation of it, with bells tolling. Prisoners of war from Pisa were forced to kiss it in 1364. At Anghiari, subject to Florence from 1385, the 15th-century Palazzo del Marzocco faces the church; at Montepulciano stands the Marzocco column; at Volterra the Marzocco stands against the Palazzo dei Priori, seat of government; at Livorno the 15th-century Torre del Marzocco (illustration, right) guards the harbor entrance; and at Pietrasanta there are a 16th-century Marzocco fountain and the Marzocco column, erected in 1513 when Pope Leo X awarded the commune to Florence.

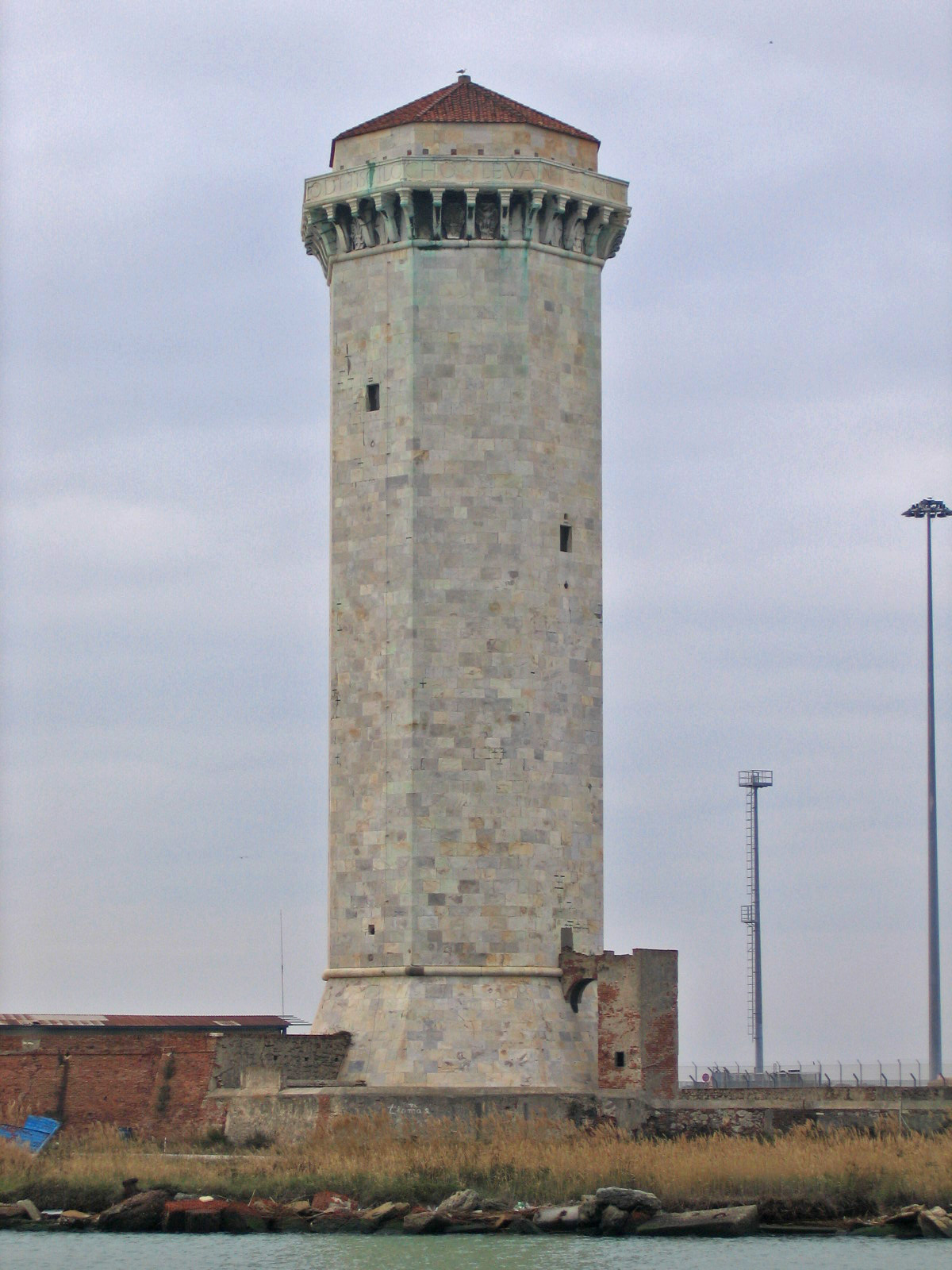
The Torre del Marzocco in Livorno.

In the subjected territory of Pisa, when Charles VIII of France entered Sarzana in 1494, the Pisans took the Marzocco, emblem of their subjugation to Florence, and cast it into the Arno. Live lions were kept at the commune's expense from the Middle Ages until they were banished in 1771.

At times the Marzocco would be crowned according to a motto by the writer of novelle Franco Sacchetti:

"Corona porto, per la patria degna,
Acciochè libertà ciascun mantegna."

== Donatello's ==
Donatello's Marzocco was commissioned by the Republic of Florence for the apartment of Pope Martin V at Santa Maria Novella, where this traditional insegna of communal republican defense stood guard atop a column at the foot of the stairs that led to the sale del papa ("Papal apartments") in the convent. It is sculpted in the fine-grained gray sandstone of Tuscany called pietra serena. The Pope lingered at Florence after leaving the Council of Constance during the Western Schism. This staircase was demolished, perhaps by 1515.

The Donatello Marzocco was moved to the Piazza della Signoria in 1812,

== After 1812 ==
A crowned Marzocco, emphasizing the sovereign independence of Tuscany, appears on Tuscany's first issue of postage stamps, 1851.

Il Marzocco was adopted for the name of a progressive weekly literary review in broadsheet format published in Florence in 1896–1932.

== See also ==
- The Medici lions

== Sources ==
- Johnson, Geraldine A Renaissance Art: A Very Short Introduction, 2005, OUP Oxford, ISBN 0192803549, 9780192803542, google books
- McHam, Sarah Blake, Looking at Italian Renaissance Sculpture, chapter "Public Sculpture in Renaissance Florence" (Cambridge University Press, 1998; paperback edition, 2000)
