= Crazia =

Italian coin

The crazia, plural crazie (from the German: Kreuzer), was an alloy coin with a value of 5 quattrini issued from the reign of Cosimo I de' Medici, first Grand Duke of Tuscany (1537 - 1574), onwards.

== History ==
It was imitated by the Duchy of Urbino, the Cybo-Malaspina family at Massa, and the Appiani and Ludovisi families in the Principality of Piombino.

An alloy coin of two crazie to the value of 10 quattrini was still being issued in the Grand Duchy of Tuscany under Leopold II (1765-1790), Ferdinand III in 1801 and Louis I of Etruria in 1802. After this date it was replaced by the 10 quattrini coin.

Later in the 19th century Tuscan postage stamps were issued in various values of crazie.

== See also ==
- History of coins in Italy
