= Papal lira =

Former currency of the Papal States

lira pontificia (Italian)
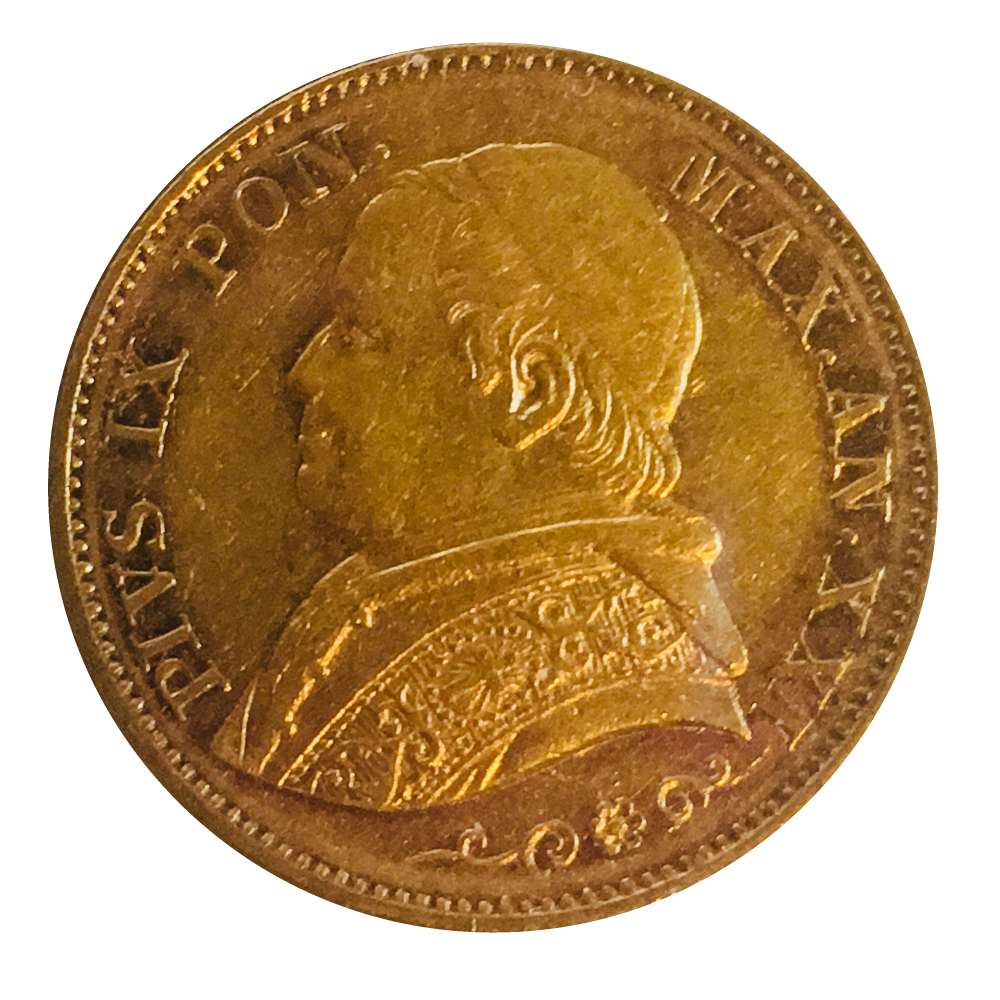
- 20 lire

Units of account
- Nickname: franc
- Subunit
- 1/20: soldo (s.)
- 1/100: centesimo (c.)

Denominations
- Coins: c.1, s.1/2, s.1, s.2, s.4, s.5, s.10 L.1, L.2, L.2 1/2, L.5
- Rarely used: L.10, L.20, L.50, L.100

Demographics
- Date of introduction: 1866
- Date of withdrawal: 1870
- Official user(s): Papal States
- Unofficial users: France (Kingdom of Italy) Italy; Switzerland; Belgium; Monaco; Andorra

Issuance
- Mint: Papal Mint

Valuation
- Pegged with: French franc
- This infobox shows the latest status before this currency was rendered obsolete.

The lira was the currency of the Papal States between 1866 and 1870. It was subdivided into 20 soldi, each of 5 centesimi.

== History ==
In 1866 Pope Pius IX, whose temporal domain had been reduced to only the province of Latium, decided to match its coinage to the Latin Monetary Union. The Papal States was never a formal member of that currency union, but this coinage was used in all of its neighboring countries.

The lira, was introduced with the same value of the French franc and the Italian lira replacing the scudo at a rate of 5.375 lire = 1 scudo : the rate was calculated thanks to the silver value of the old scudo (26.9 grams of 0.900 fine silver) and the new lira (5 grams of 0.900 fine silver). Silver denominations below 5 lire were 0.835 fine, according to the Latin Monetary Union standard. With the annexation of the Papal States to Italy in 1870, the Papal lira was replaced by the Italian lira at par.

The lira was subdivided into 100 centesimi and, differently from the other currencies of the union, into 20 soldi. However, all denomination in soldo had an equivalence in cents.

== Coins ==
Copper coins were issued in denominations of c.1, s.1/2, (c.2 1/2), s.1 (c.5), s.2 (c.10) and s.4 (c.20), with silver s.5 (c.25) and s.10 (c.50), 1, 2, 2 1/2 and 5 lire, and gold 5, 10, 20, 50 and 100 lire.

== See also ==
- Vatican lira
- Vatican euro coins
- History of coins in Italy
