= Baiocco =

Historical Italian coin

Baiocco (Italian pronunciation: [baˈjɔkko]; pl. baiocchi [baˈjɔkki]) is an ancient Italian currency denomination largely used in central Italy, especially in Lazio.

== History ==
The origin of the name is uncertain. Its value was originally equivalent to a shilling, slowly changing through centuries into five quattrini, or consequently twenty pennies.

The size, weight and value of the coin itself changed over time.

At a certain point, towards the middle of the 16th century, it became so thin that it deserved the nickname baiocchino or baiocchetto because it actually weighed less than 0.25g.

It underwent numerous other variations of material losing more and more silver and becoming more and more low alloy, so much so that it was indicated with the derogatory baiocchella during the period of Sixtus V from 1585 to 1590.

It disappeared after the unification of Italy between 1861 and 1870, when the Italian lira was introduced as an equivalent of the French franc.

== Gallery ==
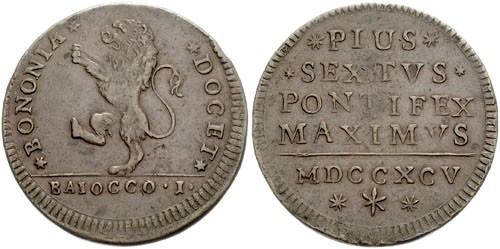

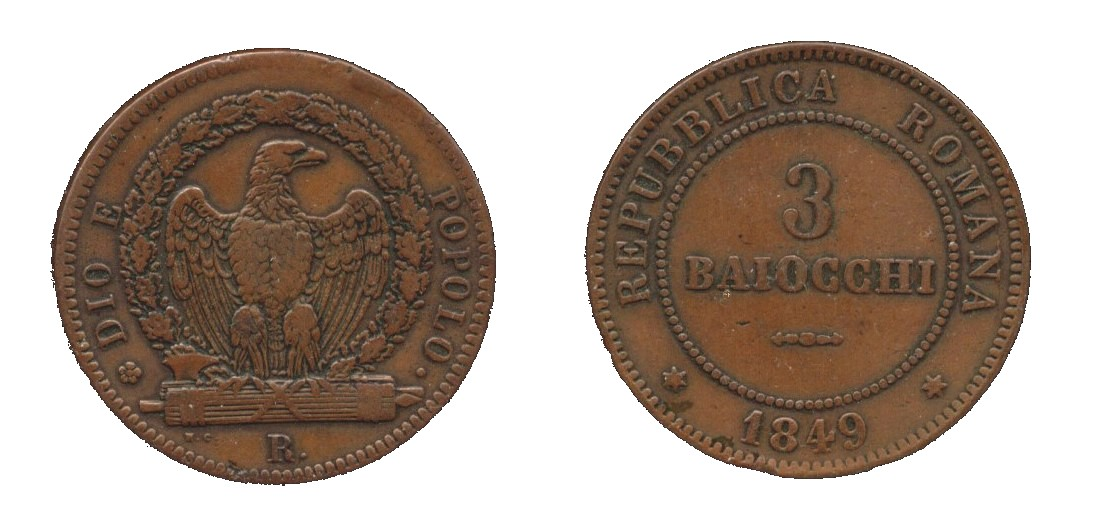

== See also ==
- History of coins in Italy
- Pound (currency)
- Shilling
- Penny
