= Soldo =

Italian medieval silver coin

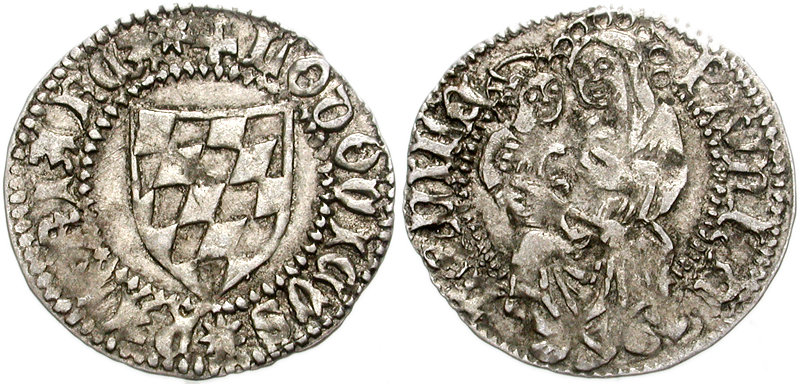
A soldo of the Patriarchate of Aquileia issued during the reign of Louis of Teck (1412–1420).

The soldo (Corsican: soldu) was an Italian silver coin, issued for the first time in the late 12th century at Milan by Emperor Henry VI. The name derives from the late Roman coin solidus.

== History ==
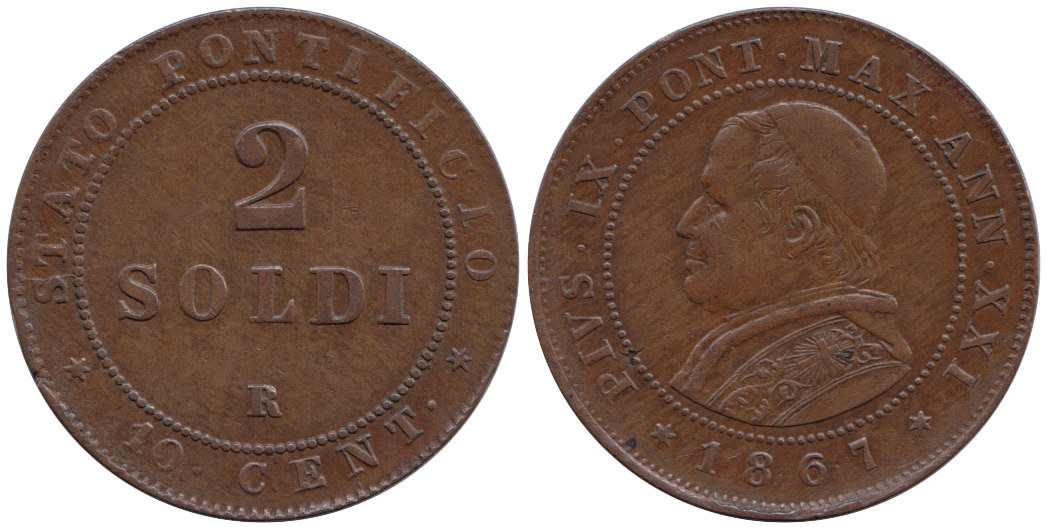
Copper 2 soldos 1867, Papal States

It quickly became widespread in Italy, where it was coined in Genoa, Bologna, and numerous other cities. In Venice, the soldo was minted from the reign of Francesco Dandolo onward, remaining in use also after the republic's dissolution in 1797 and during the Austrian occupation, until 1862. In the 14th century Florence, a soldo equaled 1/20 of a lira and 12 denari.

As time passed, the soldo started to be coined in billon and, from the 18th century, in copper. During the reign of Leopoldo II of Tuscany (19th century), it was worth three quattrini. The Napoleonic reformation of Italian coinage (early 19th century) made it worth 5 centesimi, while 20 soldi were needed to form a lira.

The term, used in medieval times to designate the pay of soldiers, became its synonym in both Italian and German (as Sold).

== See also ==
- History of coins in Italy
