= Quattrino =

Ancient Italian currency denomination

The quattrino is an ancient Italian currency denomination largely used in Central Italy, especially in Tuscany and Rome.

== History ==
Its name derives from the Latin quater denari, because its value was equal to four denari. Consequently, its value was one third of a soldo.

It essentially disappeared after the unification of Italy in 1861, when the Italian lira was introduced, but the remaining coins were defined as 1/60 of a lira.

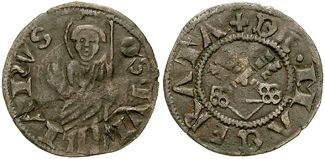

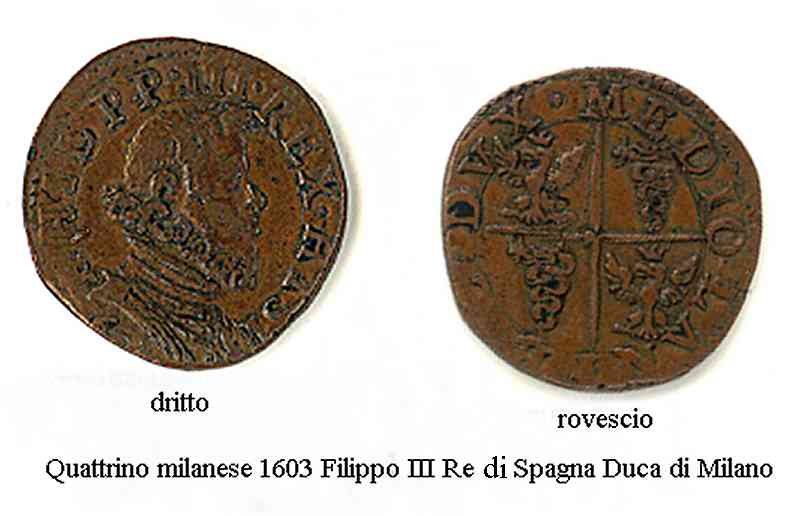

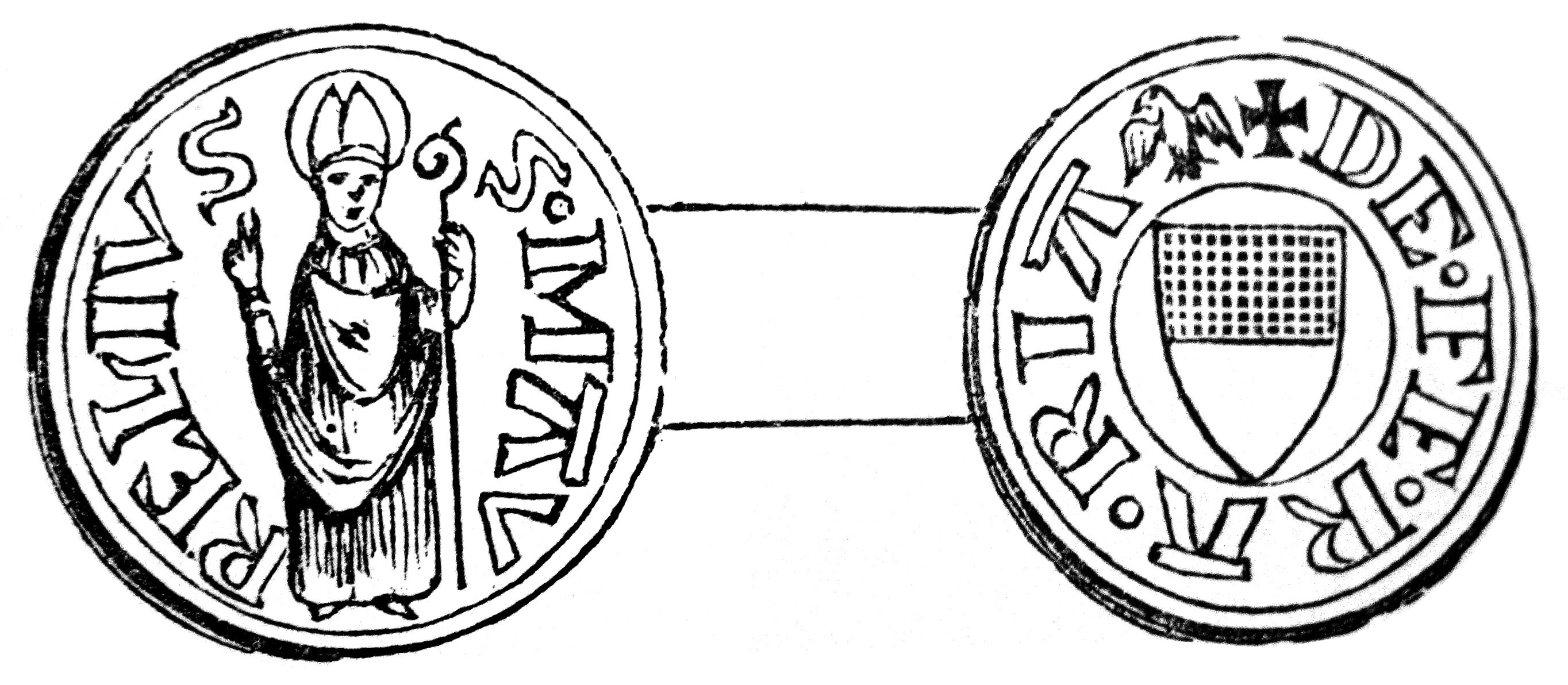

== See also ==
- History of coins in Italy
- Lira
- Soldo
- Denier
