= Vatican lira =

Currency of Vatican City from 1929 to 2002

lira vaticana (Italian) VAL
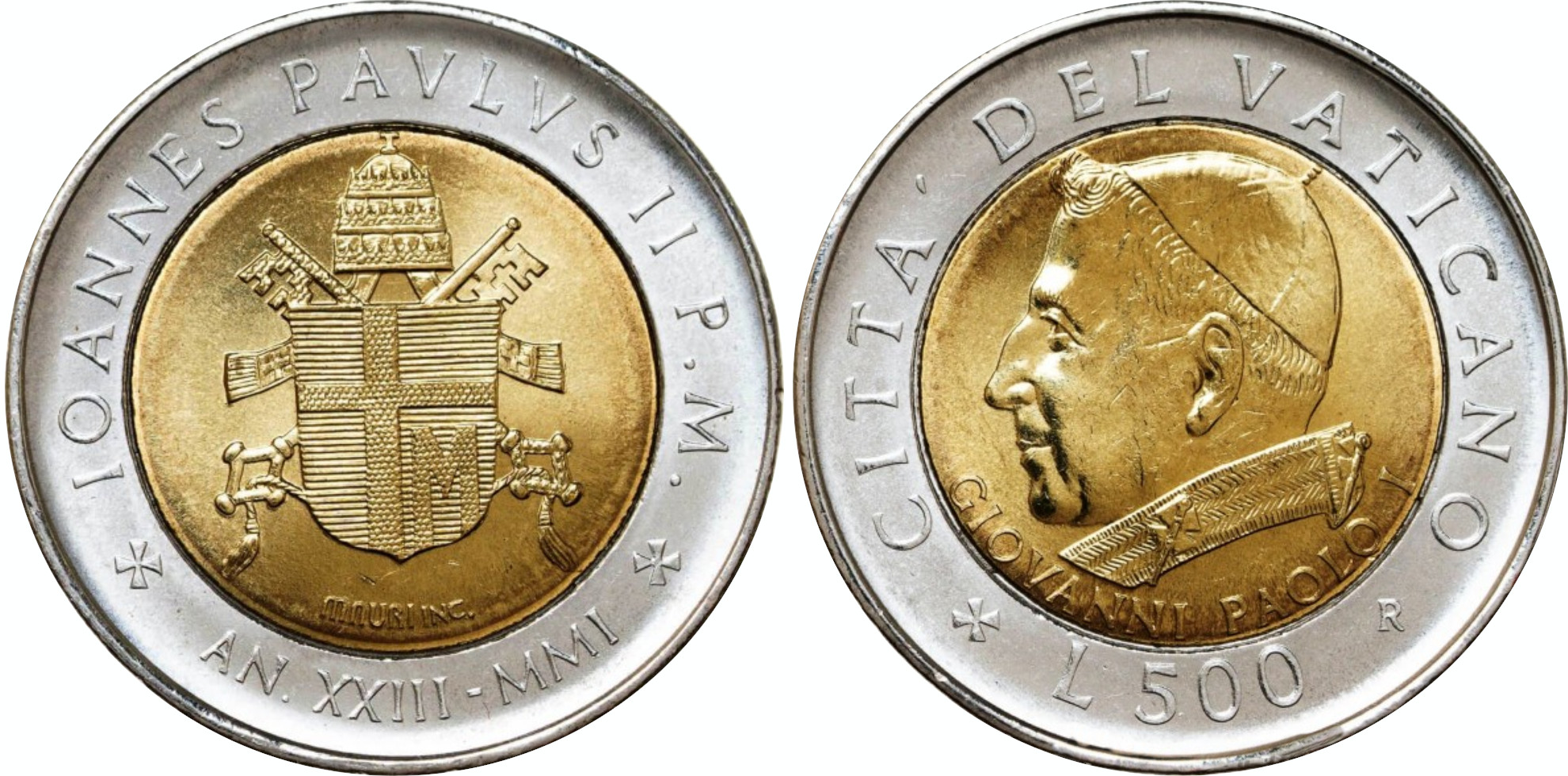
- 500 Lire

ISO 4217
- Code: ITL

Units of account
- Plural: lire
- Symbol: None official, see Italian lira
- Subunit
- 1/100: centesimo Subunits were abolished after WWII
- Plural
- centesimo: centesimi (c.)

Denominations
- Banknotes: Italian lira banknotes
- Coins
- Freq. used: 50, 100, 200, 500, 1,000 Lire
- Rarely used: 1 Lira, 2, 5, 10, 20 Lire

Demographics
- User(s): None, previously: Vatican City; Italy; San Marino

Issuance
- Central bank: Banca d'Italia
- Website: www.bancaditalia.it

Valuation

EU Exchange Rate Mechanism (ERM)
- Since: 13 March 1979, 25 November 1996 (Note: Indirectly (1:1 peg to ITL).)
- Withdrawn: 16 September 1992 (Black Wednesday)
- Fixed rate since: 31 December 1998
- Replaced by euro, non cash: 1 January 1999
- Replaced by euro, cash: 1 January 2002
- 1 € =: 1,936.27 Lire
- This infobox shows the latest status before this currency was rendered obsolete.

The lira (plural lire; abbreviation: VAL) was the currency of the Vatican City between 1929 and 2002. It was not a separate currency but an issue of the Italian lira; the Banca d'Italia produced coins specifically for Vatican City.

== History ==
The Papal States, by the late 1860s, was reduced to a small area close to Rome, used its own lira between 1866 and 1870 as a member of the Latin Monetary Union. Upon the conclusion of the Risorgimento, the state, and its currency, ceased to exist. In 1929, the Lateran Treaty established the State of the Vatican City and, according to the terms of the treaty, a distinct coinage was introduced, denominated in centesimi and lire, on par with the Italian lira. Italian coins and banknotes were legal tender in the Vatican City. The Vatican coins were minted in Rome and were also legal tender in Italy and San Marino.

In 2002, the Vatican City switched to the euro at an exchange rate of 1 euro = 1,936.27 Lire. It has its own set of euro coins.

== Coins ==
The development of Vatican coins largely mirrored the development of the Italian lire coins.

In 1929, copper c.5 and c.10, nickel c.20 and c.50, 1 Lira and 2 Lire, silver 5 Lire and 10 Lire, and gold 100 Lire coins were introduced. In 1936, the gold content of 100 Lire coins was decreased from 0.2546 to 0.1502 troy ounces (from 7.92 to 4.67 grams). In 1939, aluminium bronze replaced copper and, in 1940, stainless steel replaced nickel. Between 1941 and 1943, production of the various denominations was reduced to only a few thousand per year.

In 1947, a new coinage was introduced consisting of aluminium 1 Lira, 2 Lire, 5 Lire and 10 Lire. The sizes of these coins were reduced in 1951. In 1955, stainless steel 50 Lire and 100 Lire were introduced, followed by aluminium-bronze 20 Lire in 1957 and silver 500 Lire in 1958. The 1 Lira and 2 Lire ceased production in 1977, followed by the 5 Lire in 1978. Aluminium-bronze 200 Lire were introduced in 1978, followed by bi-metallic 500 Lire and 1,000 Lire in 1985 and 1997, respectively. The 50 Lire and 100 Lire were reduced in size in 1992.

Beginning in 1967, the Vatican began issuing coins using Roman numerals for the year of issue, as opposed to the more common Arabic numerals.

Vatican lire coins were discontinued after the advent of the euro.

Vatican City has frequently issued its coins in yearly changing commemorative series, featuring a wide variety of themes. While most of these were sold in the form of uncirculated mint sets, a portion of Vatican coins were released into general circulation.

== Officially "unissued" coins of 1938 ==
There was no official release of coins this year, and they do not appear in the Mint of Rome's records. However, a very small number of copper coins have appeared on the market.

There are two versions explaining the origin of these coins. The first version suggests that by the time of Pope Pius XI's death on February 10, 1939, Vatican City had only minted coins of 1937, although dies for the 1938 100 lire gold, 10 centesimo copper, and 5 centesimo copper had already been made. From each of these prepared dies, one example in the normal metal was struck for the King of Italy, Vittorio Emanuele III of Savoy.

The second version suggests that the minted quantity of copper coins for 1938 was destroyed due to the Pope's death, but several copies were purposefully conserved for the King of Italy's collection. This version is more likely, as the machines of that era required multiple cycles and the loading of numerous planchets in order to manufacture coins.

Both versions imply that the coins were conserved or minted for the King of Italy, who was an enthusiastic coin collector. The king collected coins for 60 years and kept them in Forte Antenna, a Roman refuge. During World War II, in anticipation of the offensive of the Allied Expeditionary Forces led by Dwight D. Eisenhower, the boxes of coins were transported at the sovereign's will to Pollenzo, a safer royal residence in Piedmont. However, in September 1943, the proclamation of the Italian Social Republic caused the royal government to lose control over the assets in the North, resulting in a long period of movement and thefts of the collection. Wehrmacht troops decided to move the collection to Germany. The crates were transported to Munich on German trucks. Mussolini was worried about the news of the "theft" of the coins and requested their return from Adolf Hitler himself. The collection was returned to Italy in early January 1944, but many boxes were opened, damaged, and some almost empty. The Italian Police Headquarters officially announced that German soldiers carried out the break-in. It is possible that soldiers used the coins stolen from the collection to buy alcohol or ice cream, which resulted in the coins being circulated.

In 1938, the Vatican issued a ten-centesimi coin; while most surviving specimens show signs of circulations, at least one uncirculated example has been certified at a high grade of MS658N.

== Circulating coins from Pius XI to Pius XII papacies (1929–1958) ==
Image		Value	Technical Parameters			Description			
Obverse	Reverse	Value	Diameter	Mass	Composition	Obverse	Reverse	Years of Issue	Papacy
		5 Centesimi	20mm	3.25 grams	95% Copper	Crowned Shield	Olive Branch	1929–1937	Pius XI
		5 Centesimi	20mm	2.95 grams	Bronzital	Crowned Shield	Olive Branch	1939–1941	Pius XII
		5 Centesimi	20mm	2.95 grams	Bronzital	Bust of Pius XII	Dove	1942–1946	Pius XII
		10 Centesimi	22mm	5.4 grams	95% Copper	Crowned Shield	Bust of St. Peter	1929–1937	Pius XI
		10 Centesimi	22mm	4.9 grams	Bronzital	Crowned Shield	Bust of St. Peter	1939–1941	Pius XII
		10 Centesimi	22mm	4.9 grams	Bronzital	Bust of Pius XII	Dove	1942–1946	Pius XII
		20 Centesimi	21mm	4.1 grams	Nickel	Crowned Arms	Bust of St. Paul	1929–1937	Pius XI
		20 Centesimi	21mm	4.1 grams	Nickel	Crowned Arms	Bust of St. Paul	1939–1941	Pius XII
		20 Centesimi	21mm	4 grams	Acmonital	Crowned Shield	Justice with law tabets	1942–1946	Pius XII
		50 Centesimi	24mm	6 grams	Nickel	Crowned Arms	Saint Michael	1929–1937	Pius XI
		50 Centesimi	24mm	6 grams	Nickel	Crowned Arms	Saint Michael	1939–1941	Pius XII
		50 Centesimi	24mm	6 grams	Stainless Steel	Crowned Shield	Justice with law tabets	1942–1946	Pius XII
		1 Lira	27mm	8.1 grams	Nickel	Crowned Arms	St. Mary standing atop globe	1929–1937	Pius XI
		1 Lira	26.65mm	7.86 grams	Acmonital	Crowned Arms	St. Mary standing atop globe	1940–1941	Pius XII
		1 Lira	26.65mm	7.86 grams	Acmonital	Crowned Arms	Justice with law tabets	1942–1946	Pius XII
		1 Lira	26.65mm	1.25 grams	Italma	Crowned Arms	Justice with law tabets	1947–1949	Pius XII
		1 Lira	26.65mm	1.25 grams	Italma	Crowned Arms	Holy Door	1950	Pius XII
		1 Lira	17mm	0.6200 grams	Italma	Crowned Arms	Temperance standing pouring libation in bowl	1951–1956	Pius XII
		2 Lire	29mm	10 grams	Nickel	Crowned Arms	Lamb on shepherd's shoulders	1929–1937	Pius XI
		2 Lire	29mm	10 grams	Nickel	Crowned Arms	Lamb on shepherd's shoulders	1939	Pius XII
		2 Lire	29mm	10.2 grams	Stainless Steel	Crowned Arms	Lamb on shepherd's shoulders	1940–1941	Pius XII
		2 Lire	29mm	10.2 grams	Stainless Steel	Crowned Shield	Justice with law tabets	1942–1946	Pius XII
		2 Lire	24mm	1.75 grams	Aluminum	Crowned Shield	Justice with law tabets	1947–1949	Pius XII
		2 Lire	24mm	1.75 grams	Aluminum	Pius XII bust	Dove and St. Peter's Basilica Dome	1950	Pius XII
		2 Lire	18mm		Aluminum	Crowned Shield	Fortitude standing with lion at feet	1951–1958	Pius XII
		5 Lire	23mm	5 grams	0.8350 Silver	Bust of Pius XI	St. Peter in a boat	1929–1937	Pius XI
		5 Lire	23mm	5 grams	0.8350 Silver	Arms of Cardinal Eugenio	Dove within half sun	1939	Sede Vacante
		5 Lire	23mm	5 grams	0.8350 Silver	Bust of Pius XII	St. Peter in a boat	1939–1941	Pius XII
		5 Lire	23mm	5 grams	0.8350 Silver	Bust of Pius XII	Caritas figure with children	1942–1946	Pius XII
		5 Lire	26.5mm	2.5 grams	Aluminum	Bust of Pius XII	Caritas figure with children	1947–1949	Pius XII
		5 Lire	26.5mm	2.5 grams	Aluminum	Bust of Pius XII	Pope with staff within Holy Door	1950	Pius XII
		5 Lire	20mm	1 gram	Aluminum	Bust of Pius XII	Justice standing with sword and scales	1951–1958	Pius XII
		10 Lire	27mm	10 grams	0.8350 Silver	Bust of Pius XI	St. Mary holding infant	1929–1937	Pius XI
		10 Lire	27mm	10 grams	0.8350 Silver	Arms of Cardinal Eugenio	Dove within half sun	1939	Sede Vacante
		10 Lire	27mm	10 grams	0.8350 Silver	Bust of Pius XII	St. Mary holding infant	1939–1941	Pius XII
		10 Lire	27mm	10 grams	0.8350 Silver	Bust of Pius XII	Caritas figure with children	1942–1946	Pius XII
		10 Lire	29mm	3 grams	Aluminum	Bust of Pius XII	Caritas figure with children	1947–1949	Pius XII
		10 Lire			Aluminum	Bust of Pius XII	Pope with staff within Holy Door	1950	Pius XII
		10 Lire	23mm	1 gram	Aluminum	Bust of Pius XII	Prudence standing	1951–1958	Pius XII
		20 Lire	21.25mm	3.600 grams	Aluminum-Bronze	Bust of Pius XII	Caritas figure with children	1957	Pius XII
		20 Lire	21.25mm	5.600 grams	Aluminum-Bronze	Bust of Pius XII	Caritas figure with children	1958	Pius XII
		50 Lire	24.8mm	6.200 grams	Stainless Steel	Bust of Pius XII	Spes standing with large anchor	1955–1958	Pius XII
		100 Lire	23.5mm	8.8 grams	0.9000 Gold	Bust of Pius XI	Jesus with child at feet	1929–1935	Pius XI
		100 Lire	20.5mm	5.19 grams	0.9000 Gold	Bust of Pius XI	Jesus with child at feet	1936–1938	Pius XI
		100 Lire	20.5mm	5.19 grams	0.9000 Gold	Bust of Pius XII	Jesus with child at feet	1939–1941	Pius XII
		100 Lire	20.5mm	5.19 grams	0.9000 Gold	Bust of Pius XII	Caritas figure with children	1942–1949	Pius XII
		100 Lire	20.5mm	5.19 grams	0.9000 Gold	Crowned Pius XII	Opening of Holy Door	1950	Pius XII
		100 Lire	20.5mm	5.19 grams	0.9000 Gold	Bust of Pius XII	Caritas figure with children	1951–1956	Pius XII
		100 Lire	20.5mm	5.19 grams	0.9000 Gold	Bust of Pius XII	Crowned Shield	1957–1958	Pius XII
		100 Lire	27.75mm	8.000 grams	Stainless Steel	Bust of Pius XII	Fides with large cross	1955–1958	Pius XII
		500 Lire	29mm	11.000 grams	0.8350 Silver	Bust of Pius XII	Crowned Shield	1958	Pius XII

== See also ==
- Economy of Vatican City
- Index of Vatican City–related articles
- Philatelic and Numismatic Office of the Vatican City State
- Vatican euro coins
