= Italian lira =

Currency of Italy from 1861 to 2002

lira italiana (Italian)
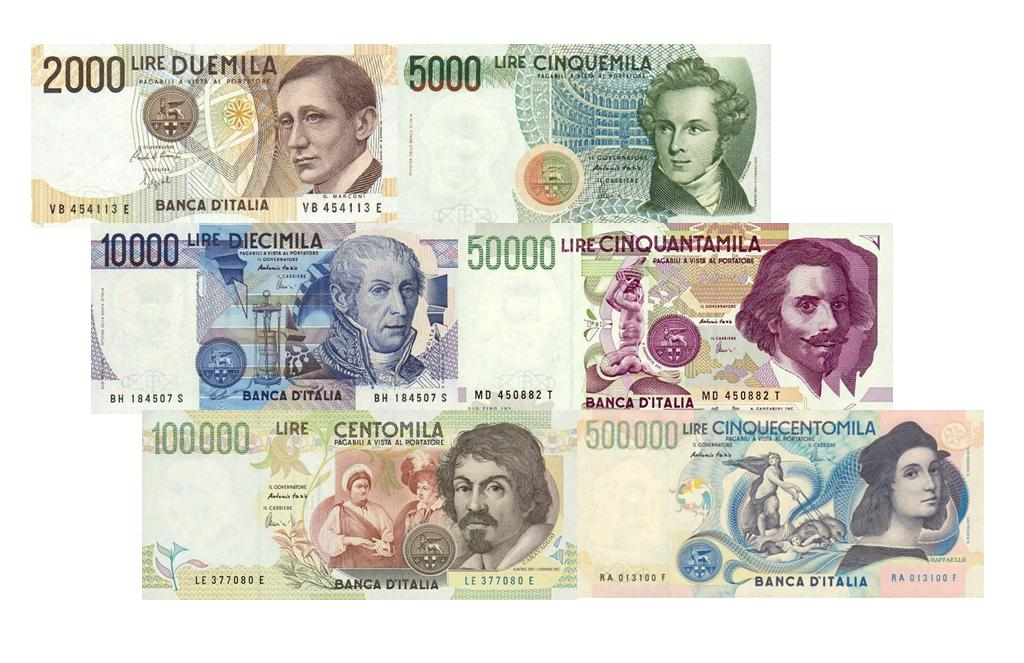
Italian banknotes ranging from 2,000 to 500,000 lire
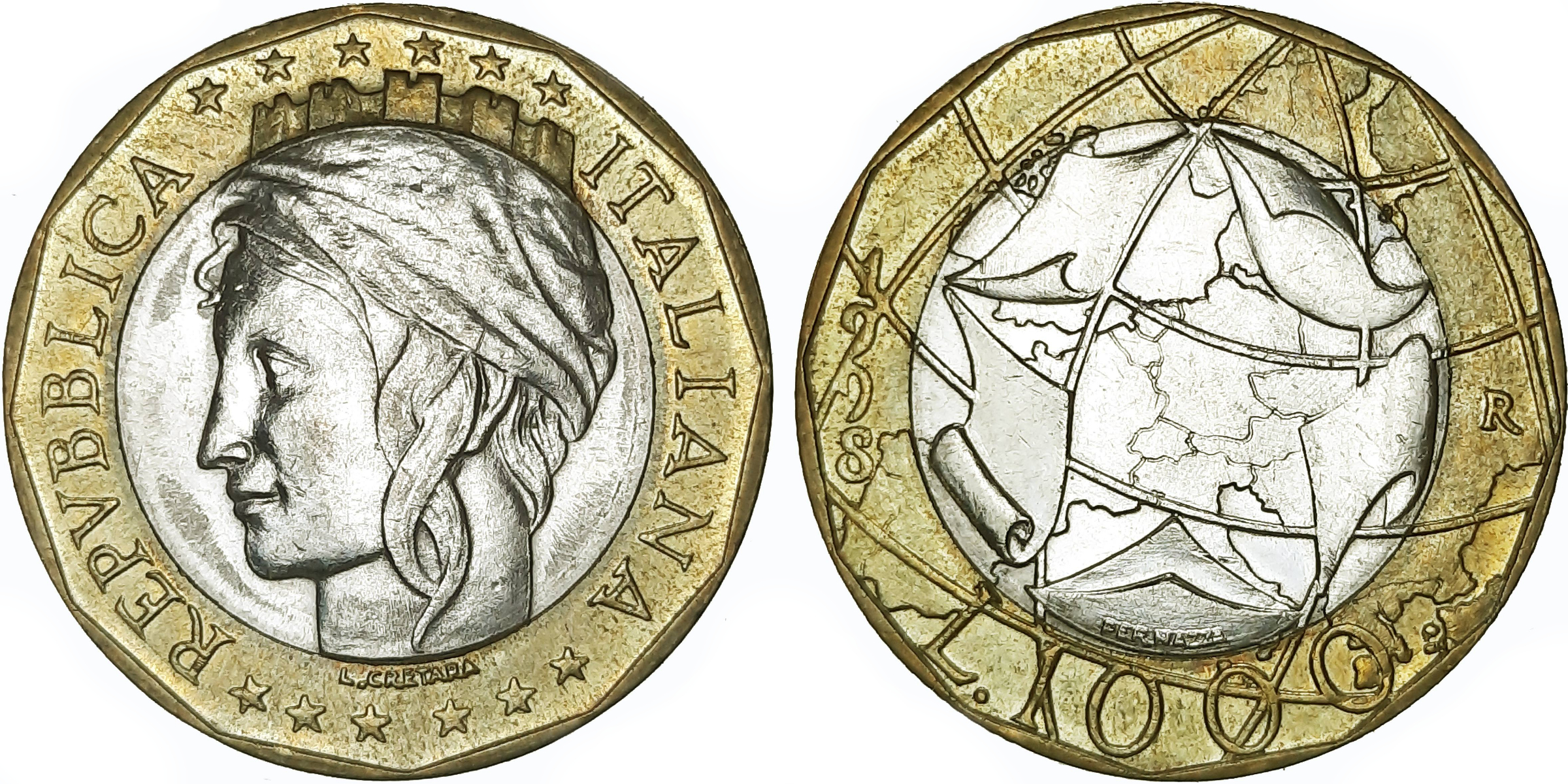
1,000 lire coin (1998)

ISO 4217
- Code: ITL

Units of account
- Plural: Lire
- Symbol: ₤ None official (see § Notation and symbols)
- Subunit
- 1/100: Centesimo (withdrawn after World War II)
- Plural
- Centesimo: Centesimi

Denominations
- Banknotes
- Freq. used: 1,000, 2,000, 5,000, 10,000, 50,000, 100,000 lire
- Rarely used: 20,000, 500,000 lire
- Coins
- Freq. used: 50, 100, 200, 500, 1,000 lire
- Rarely used: 1 lira, 2, 5, 10, 20 lire

Demographics
- User(s): None, previously: Italy: Napoleonic Italy (1805-1814); Kingdom of Italy (1861-1946); Italian Social Republic (1943–1945); Free Territory of Trieste (1947–1954); Free State of Fiume (1920–24); Kingdom of Albania (1939–43); San Marino (local issue: Sammarinese lira) Vatican City (local issue: Vatican lira)

Issuance
- Central bank: Banca d'Italia
- Website: www.bancaditalia.it
- Printer: Istituto Poligrafico e Zecca dello Stato
- Website: www.ipzs.it
- Mint: Istituto Poligrafico e Zecca dello Stato
- Website: www.ipzs.it

Valuation
- Inflation: 2.3% (2001)

EU Exchange Rate Mechanism (ERM)
- Since: 13 March 1989, 25 November 1996
- Withdrawn: 17 September 1992
- Fixed rate since: 31 December 1998
- Replaced by euro, non cash: 1 January 1999
- Replaced by euro, cash: 1 March 2002
- 1 € =: Lit 1,936.27
- This infobox shows the latest status before this currency was rendered obsolete.

The lira (/ˈlɪərə/ LEER-ə, Italian: [ˈliːra]; pl.: lire, /ˈlɪərɛ/ LEER-eh, Italian: [ˈliːre]) was the currency of Italy between 1861 and 2002. It was introduced by the Napoleonic Kingdom of Italy in 1807 at par with the French franc, and was subsequently adopted by the different states that would eventually form the Kingdom of Italy in 1861. It was subdivided into 100 centesimi (sing.: centesimo), which means "hundredths" or "cents". The lira was also the currency of the Albanian Kingdom from 1941 to 1943.

The term originates from libra, the largest unit of the Carolingian monetary system used in Western Europe and elsewhere from the 8th to the 20th century. The Carolingian system is the origin of the French livre tournois (predecessor of the franc), the Italian lira, and the pound unit of sterling and related currencies.

In 1999, the euro became Italy's unit of account and the lira became a national subunit of the euro at a rate of €1 = Lit 1,936.27, before being replaced as cash in 2002.

== History ==
=== Etymology ===
The Carolingian monetary system divided the libra into 20 solidi (sing.: solidus) or 240 denarii (sing.: denarius). These units translate in Italian to lira, soldo and denaro; in French to livre, sou and denier; and in English to pound, shilling and penny.

In France, the "franc" referred to a coin worth one livre tournois. This term was also adopted in various Gallo-Italic languages in north-western Italy to refer to the Italian lira.

=== Notation and symbols ===
There was no standard sign or abbreviation for the Italian lira. The abbreviations Lit. (standing for Lira italiana) and L. (standing for Lira) and the signs ₤ or £ were all accepted representations of the currency. Banks and financial institutions, including the Bank of Italy, often used Lit. and this was regarded internationally as the abbreviation for the Italian lira. Handwritten documents and signs at market stalls would often use "£" or "₤", while coins used "L." Italian postage stamps mostly used the word lire in full but some (such as the 1975 monuments series) used "L."

The name of the currency could also be written in full as a prefix or a suffix (e.g. Lire 100,000 or 100,000 lire).

The ISO 4217 currency code for the lira was ITL.

The Unicode CJK Compatibility block includes square versions of currency names in Japanese katakana for compatibility with earlier character sets which would display them in tables or vertical writing. Thus, U+3352 ㍒ SQUARE RIRA stands for リラ rira. It is not intended for use in new applications.

=== Introduction of the lira ===
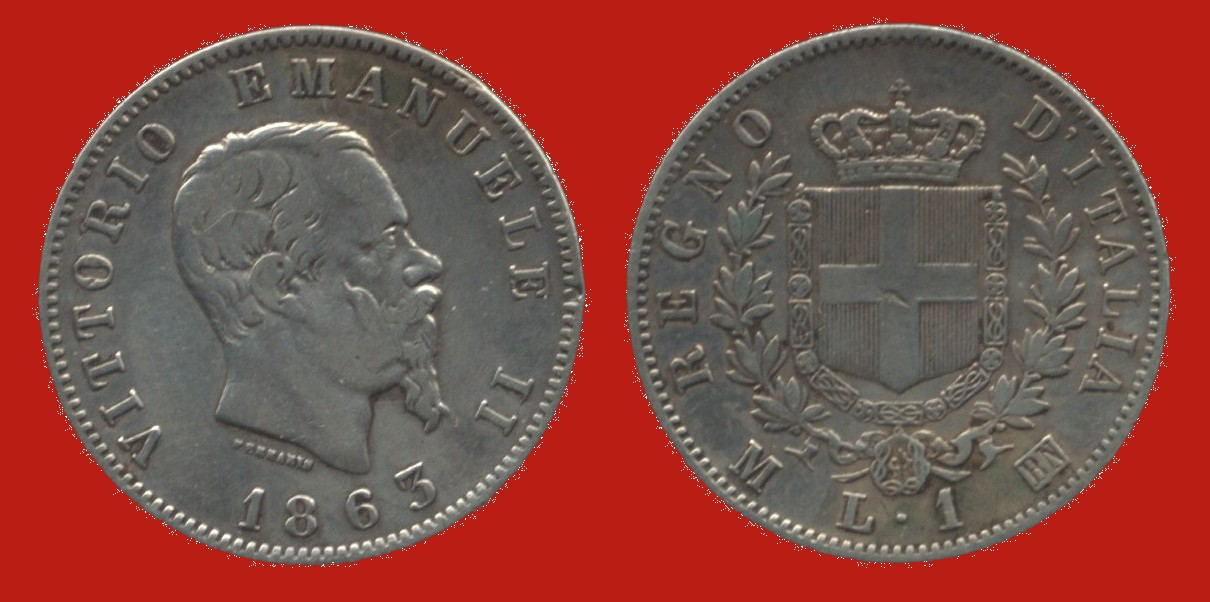
Silver 1 lira of King Vittorio Emanuele II, 1863

The Napoleonic Kingdom of Italy introduced the Italian lira in 1807 at par with the French franc, worth 4.5 grams of fine silver or 0.29032 gram of fine gold (gold-silver ratio 15.5). Despite the kingdom's fall in 1814, this new lira eventually replaced the currencies of the different Italian states until their unification in 1861, replacing, among others:

- The Piedmontese scudo, Sardinian scudo and the Genoese lira after 1800, by the Italian lira;
- The Milanese lira, Venetian lira, Lombardo-Venetian lira and Parman lira after 1814, at the rate of 270 Milanese lire = 45 Milanese scudi = 405 Venetian lire = 855 Parman lire = 207.23 Italian lire;
- The Tuscan fiorino and the Tuscan lira in 1859, at 1 francescone = 4 fiorini = 6 2/3 Tuscan lire = 5.6 Italian lire;
- The piastra of Naples and Sicily in 1861, at 1 piastra = 1.2 ducat di regno = 5.1 Neapolitan lire, the latter at par with the Italian lira; and
- The scudo of Rome and the Papal States in 1866, at 1 scudo = 5.375 Papal lire, the latter at par with the Italian lira.

In 1865, Italy formed part of the Latin Monetary Union in which the lira was set as equal to, among others, the French, Belgian and Swiss francs. The U.S. dollar was worth approximately 5.18 Italian lire until 1914.

=== 20th century ===
World War I broke the Latin Monetary Union and resulted in prices rising several fold in Italy. Inflation was curbed somewhat by Benito Mussolini, who, on 18 August 1926, announced a new exchange rate between the lira and pound sterling of £1 = Lit 92.46 (the so-called Quota 90) although the free exchange rate had been closer to Lit 140–150 to the pound, causing a temporary deflation and widespread problems in the real economy. In 1927, the lira was pegged to the U.S. dollar at a rate of $1 = Lit 19. This rate lasted until 1934, with a separate "tourist" rate of $1 = Lit 24.89 being established in 1936. In 1939, the "official" rate was Lit 19.80.

After the Allied invasion of Italy, an exchange rate was set at $1 = Lit 120 (£1 = Lit 480) in June 1943, reduced to Lit 100 the following month. In German-occupied Italy, the exchange rate was set at 1 ℛ︁ℳ︁ = Lit 10. After the war, the value of the lira fluctuated, before Italy set a peg of $1 = Lit 575 within the Bretton Woods system in November 1947. Following the devaluation of the pound, Italy devalued to $1 = Lit 625 on 21 September 1949. This rate was maintained until the end of the Bretton Woods system in the early 1970s. Several episodes of high inflation followed until the introduction of the euro.

=== Lira pesante ===
Due to the lira's low value after the war economic calculations and price displays became unwieldy because of the large number of zeroes. As early as the 1950s suggestions were made to redenominate the lira but no serious efforts were made at that time. In the 1970s a plan known as lira pesante (English: heavy lira) or lira nuova (new lira) was proposed. The lira pesante would have redenominated the currency at 1,000:1, removing 3 zeroes. However the project went dormant for several years before being revived in 1984. Ongoing heavy inflation saw the lira pesante pushed back until it was permanently abandoned in 1991 because of plans for a single European currency.

=== Introduction of the euro ===
The lira was the official unit of currency in Italy until 1 January 1999, when it was replaced by the euro (the lira was officially a national subunit of the euro until the rollout of euro coins and notes in 2002). Old lira denominated currency ceased to be legal tender on 28 February 2002. The conversion rate was Lit 1,936.27 to the euro.

All lira banknotes in use immediately before the introduction of the euro, and all post-World War II coins, were exchanged by the Bank of Italy up to 6 December 2011. Originally, Italy's central bank pledged to redeem Italian coins and banknotes until 29 February 2012, but this was brought forward to 6 December 2011.

== Coins ==
=== Napoleonic lira, 1807–1814 ===
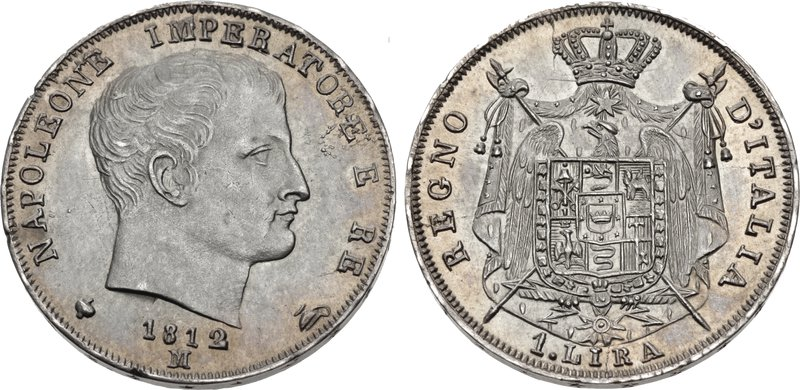
Silver 1 Lira depicting Napoleon I, 1812

The Napoleonic Kingdom of Italy issued coins between 1807 and 1813 in denominations of 1 and 3 centesimi and 1 soldo (5 centesimi) in copper, c.10 in 20% silver alloy, s.5, s.10 and s.15 (or c.25, c.50 and c.75 centesimi), 1 lira, 2 lire and 5 lire in 90% silver and 20 lire and 40 lire in 90% gold. All except the c.10 bore a portrait of Napoleon I, with the denominations below 1 lira also showing a radiate crown and the higher denominations, a shield representing the various constituent territories of the Kingdom.

=== Between the Restoration and the Risorgimento, 1814–1861 ===
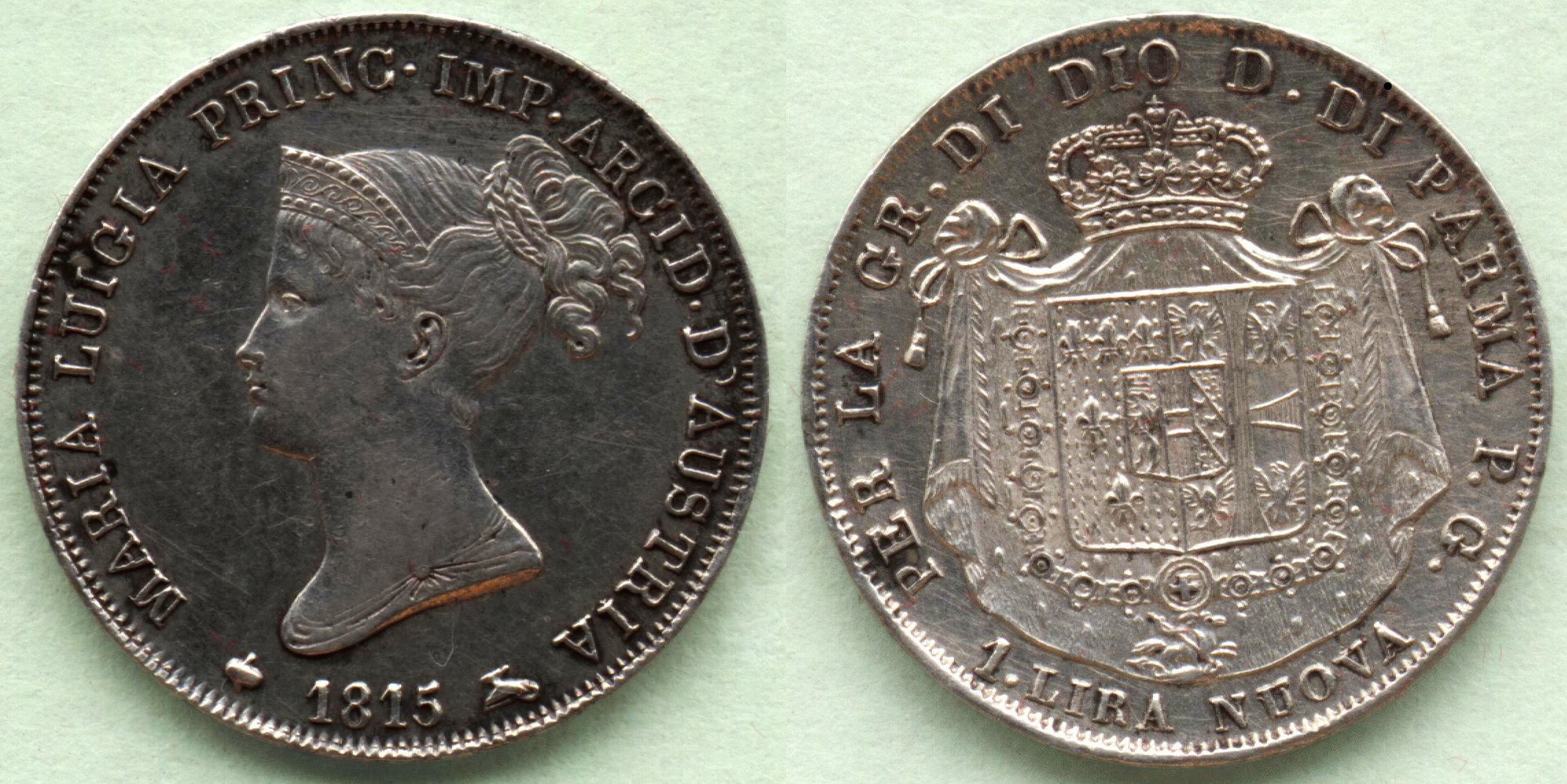
Silver 1 Lira depicting Marie Louise, Duchess of Parma, 1815

After the end of the Napoleonic Kingdom of Italy in 1814, the lira remained present only in the Duchy of Parma and the Kingdom of Piedmont-Sardinia. The lira of Parma was introduced by Duchess Marie Louise, Duchess of Parma, who issued coin denominations of 1, 3, 5, 25, 50 cents and 1, 2, 5, 20 and 40 lire, while gold coins of 10, 50, 80 and 100 lire were also minted from the Piedmont-Sardinia lira introduced by Victor Emmanuel I of Savoy.

=== Kingdom of Italy, 1861–1946 ===
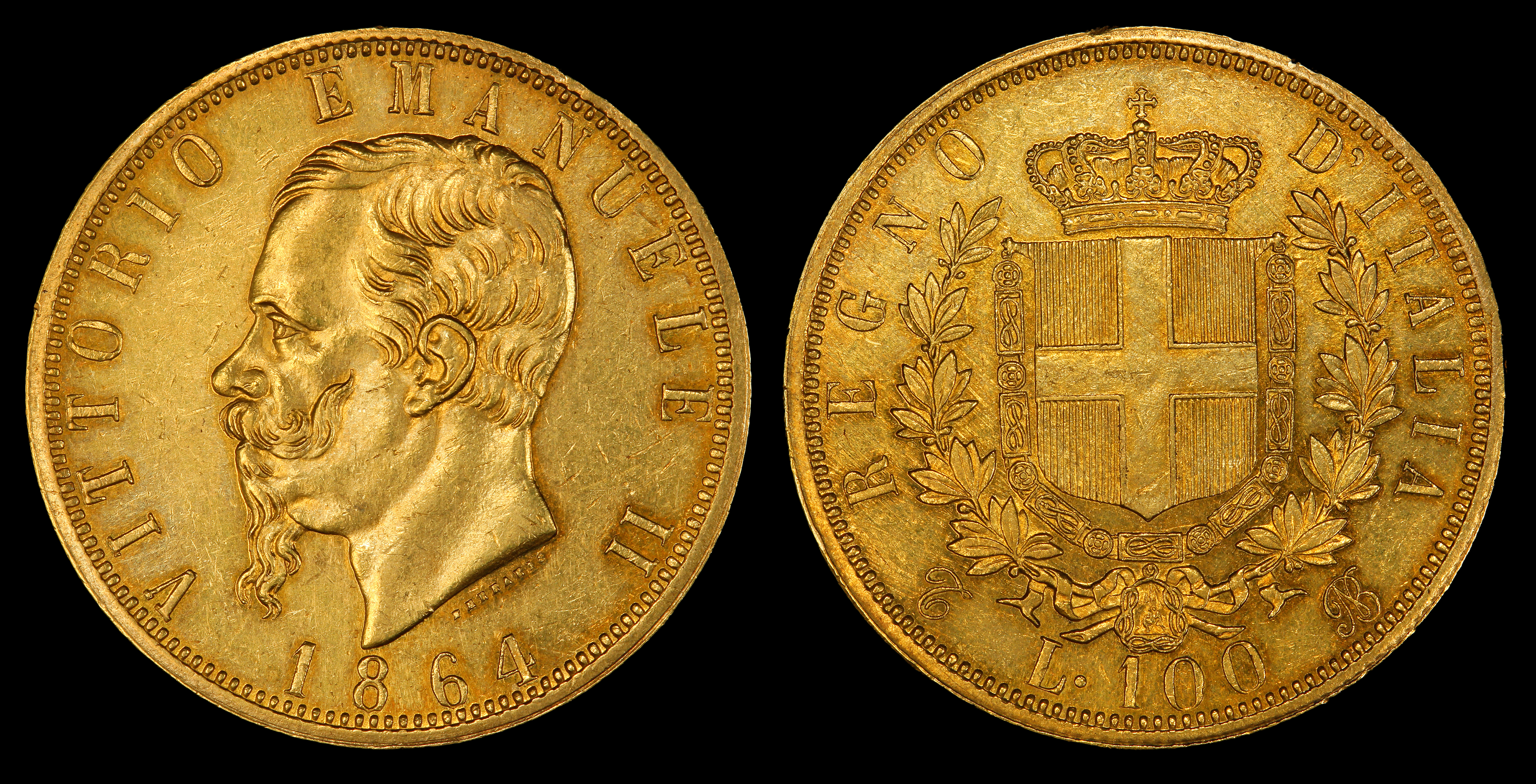
Gold 100 Lire depicting King Victor Emmanuel II of Italy, 1864

In 1861, coins were minted in Florence, Milan, Naples and Turin in denominations of c.1, c.2, c.5, c.10 and c.50, 1 lira, 2, 5, 10 and 20 lire, with the lowest four in copper, the highest two in gold and the remainder in silver. In 1863, silver coins below 5 lire were debased from 90% to 83.5% and silver c.20 coins were introduced. Minting switched to Rome in the 1870s.

Apart from the introduction in 1894 of cupro-nickel (later nickel) c.20 coins and of nickel c.25 pieces in 1902, the coinage remained essentially unaltered until the First World War.

In 1919, with the purchasing power of the lira reduced to one fifth of that of 1914, the production of all earlier coin types except for the nickel c.20 halted, and smaller, copper c.5 and c.10 and nickel c.50 coins were introduced, followed by nickel 1 lira and 2 lire pieces in 1922 and 1923, respectively. In 1926, silver 5 and 10 lire coins were introduced, equal in size and composition to the earlier 1 lira and 2 lire coins. Silver 20 lire coins were added in 1927.

In 1936, the last substantial issue of silver coins was made, whilst, in 1939, moves to reduce the cost of the coinage led to copper being replaced by aluminium bronze and nickel by stainless steel. All production of coinage halted in 1943.

In 1943 the AM-lira was issued, in circulation in Italy after the landing in Sicily on the night of 9 July 1943. After 1946, the AM-lira ceased to be the currency of employment and was used along with normal notes, until 3 June 1950.

Between 1947 and 1954, zone B of the Free Territory of Trieste used the Triestine lira.

=== Italian Republic, 1946–2002 ===
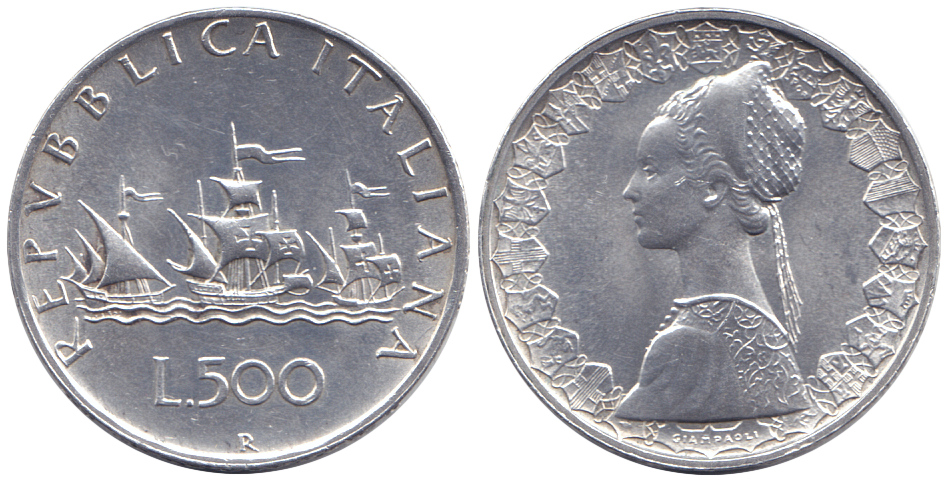
Silver 500 L. featuring the ships of Christopher Columbus, 1960

Coin production resumed slowly in 1946, reaching 1 million minted in 1948, with the purchasing power of the lira reduced to 2% of its value in 1939. Initially, 1 lira, 2, 5 and 10 L. coins were issued in aluminium. These coins were in circulation together with the AM-lire and some of the old, devalued coins of the Italian Kingdom. In 1951, the government replaced all circulating coins and notes with new smaller-sized aluminium 1 lira, 2, 5 and 10 L. (although the 2 L. coin was not minted in 1951 or 1952), and in 1954–1955, Acmonital (stainless steel) 50 and 100 L. coins were introduced, followed by aluminium-bronze 20 L. in 1957 and silver 500 L. in 1958. Increases in the silver bullion price led to the 500 L. coins being produced only in small numbers for collectors after 1967. The 500 L. (and later the 1,000 L.) also appeared in a number of commemorative coin issues, such as the centennial of Italian unification in 1961. Between 1967 and 1982, two types of "paper money" were issued with a value of 500 L.. These were not issued by "Banca d'Italia", but directly by the government bearing the title "Repubblica Italiana".

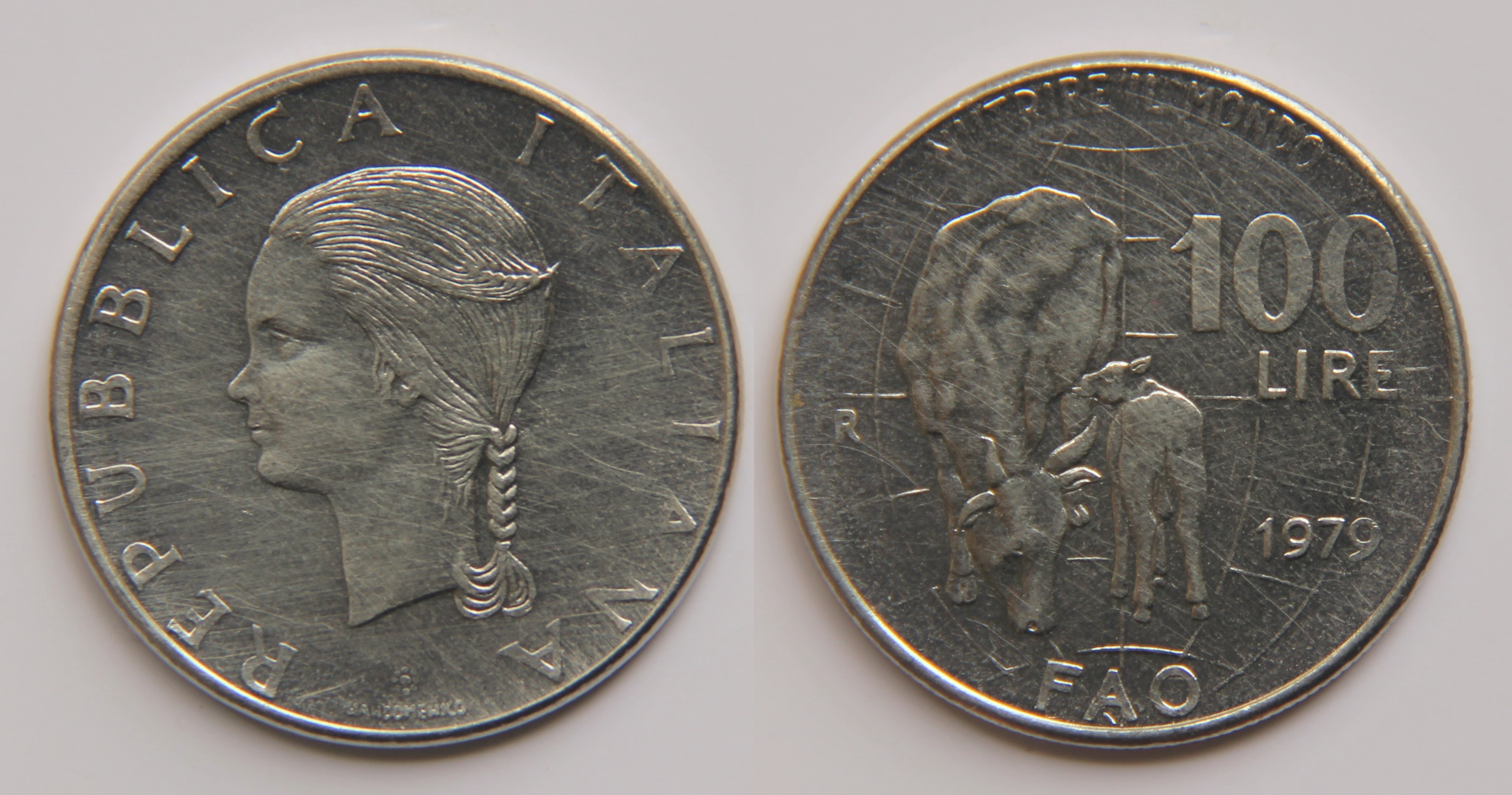
100 L. FAO commemorative coin, 1979

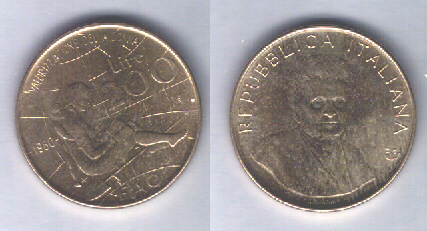
200 L. Maria Montessori commemorative coin, 1980

In 1977, aluminium-bronze 200 L. coins were introduced, followed in 1982 by the bimetallic 500 L.. This was the first bi-metallic coin to be produced for circulation, minted using a system patented by IPZS. It was also the first to feature the value in braille.

Production of 1 lira and 2 L. coins for circulation ceased in 1959; their mintage was restarted from 1982 to 2001 for collectors' coin sets. Production of the 5 L. coin was greatly reduced in the late 1970s and ceased for circulation in 1998. Similarly, in 1991 the production of 10 and 20 L. coins was limited. The sizes of the 50 and 100 L. coins were reduced in 1990, but then they were completely redesigned in 1993. A bimetallic 1,000 L. coin was introduced in 1997 and stopped in 1998 due to the impending introduction of the euro.

Coins still being minted for circulation at the time of the changeover to euro (in 2000 and 2001 only lire for collectors coins sets were minted) were:

- 1 lira (0.05 cents, only for collectors)
- 2 L. (0.10 cents, only for collectors)
- 5 L. (0.26 cents, only for collectors)
- 10 L. (0.52 cents, only for collectors)
- 20 L. (1.03 cents, only for collectors)
- 50 L. (2.58 cents)
- 100 L. (5.16 cents)
- 200 L. (10.33 cents)
- 500 L. (25.82 cents)
- 1,000 L. (51.65 cents)

Coins of the Italian lira (1951–1997)
Image	Value	Technical parameters			Description			Issued from
Image	Value	Diameter (mm)	Mass (g)	Composition	Edge	Obverse	Reverse	Issued from
	1 L.	17.20	0.62	Aluminium	Smooth	Weighing scale; lettering: REPVBBLICA ITALIANA	Cornucopia; value; year of issue	1951–2001
	2 L.	18.30	0.80	Aluminium	Reeded	Bee; lettering: REPVBBLICA ITALIANA	Olive branch; value; year of issue	1953–2001
	5 L.	20.20	1.00	Aluminium	Smooth	Rudder; lettering: REPVBBLICA ITALIANA	Dolphin; value; year of issue	1951–2001
	10 L.	23.25	1.60	Aluminium	Smooth	Plough; year of issue; lettering: REPVBBLICA ITALIANA	Wheat ears; value	1951–2001
	20 L.	21.25	3.60	Bronzital	Reeded	Female profile with wheat ears; lettering: REPVBBLICA ITALIANA	Oak branch; value; year of issue	1957–1959
	20 L.	21.25	3.60	Bronzital	Smooth	Female profile with wheat ears; lettering: REPVBBLICA ITALIANA	Oak branch; value; year of issue	1959–2001
	50 L.	24.80	6.25	Acmonital	Reeded	Female profile with laurel crown; lettering: REPVBBLICA ITALIANA	Vulcan; value; year of issue	1954–1989
	50 L.	16.55	2.70	Acmonital	Smooth	Female profile with laurel crown; lettering: REPVBBLICA ITALIANA	Vulcan; value; year of issue	1990–1995
	50 L.	19.20	4.50	Cupronickel	Smooth	Italia turrita; lettering: REPVBBLICA ITALIANA	Cornucopia; value; year of issue	1996–2001
	100 L.	27.80	8.00	Acmonital	Reeded	Female profile with oak branches; lettering: REPVBBLICA ITALIANA	Minerva; value; year of issue	1955–1989
	100 L.	18.30	3.30	Acmonital	Reeded	Female profile with oak branches; lettering: REPVBBLICA ITALIANA	Minerva; value; year of issue	1990–1992
	100 L.	22.00	4.50	Cupronickel	Interrupted reeding	Italia turrita; lettering: REPVBBLICA ITALIANA	Bird, dolphin; wheat stalk, olive branch; value	1993–2001
	200 L.	24.00	5.00	Bronzital	Reeded	Allegorical woman; lettering: REPVBBLICA ITALIANA	Cogwheel; value; year of issue	1977–2001
	500 L.	29.00	11.00	Silver: 83.5%	Embossed lettering: REPVBBLICA ITALIANA ✩✩✩(year)✩✩✩	Columbus' caravels; lettering: REPVBBLICA ITALIANA	Woman in Renaissance dress; 19 shields	1958–2001
	500 L.	25.80	6.80	Outer: Acmonital	Interrupted reeding	Effigy of the republic; lettering: REPVBBLICA ITALIANA	Piazza del Quirinale; value; year of issue	1982–2001
	500 L.	25.80	6.80	Inner: Bronzital	Interrupted reeding	Effigy of the republic; lettering: REPVBBLICA ITALIANA	Piazza del Quirinale; value; year of issue	1982–2001
	1000 L.	27.00	8.80	Outer: Bronzital	Interrupted reeding	Italia turrita; lettering: REPVBBLICA ITALIANA	Map of Europe; value; year of issue	1997–2001
	1000 L.	27.00	8.80	Inner: Cupronickel	Interrupted reeding	Italia turrita; lettering: REPVBBLICA ITALIANA	Map of Europe; value; year of issue	1997–2001

== Banknotes ==
In 1882, the government began issuing low-denomination paper money bearing the title "Biglietto di Stato" (meaning "Ticket of the state"). To begin with, there were 5 lire and 10 lire notes, to which 25 lire notes were occasionally added from 1895. The government also issued notes titled "Buono di Cassa" between 1893 and 1922 in denominations of 1 lira and 2 lire. Production of Biglietti di Stato ceased in 1925 but resumed in 1935 with notes for 1 lira, 2, 5 and 10 lire being introduced by 1939.

The Bank of Italy began producing paper money in 1896. To begin with, 50, 100, 500 and 1,000 lire notes were issued. In 1918–1919, 25 lire notes were also issued but no other denominations were introduced until after the Second World War.

In 1943, the invading Allies introduced notes in denominations of 1 lira, 2, 5, 10, 50, 100, 500 and 1,000 lire. These were followed in 1944 by a series of Biglietti di Stato for 1 lira, 2, 5 and 10 lire, which circulated until replaced by coins in the late 1940s. The Bank of Italy introduced 5,000 and 10,000 lire notes in 1947 and 1948, respectively.

In 1951, the government again issued notes, this time simply bearing the title "Repubblica Italiana". Denominations were of 50 and 100 lire (replacing the Bank of Italy notes) and they circulated until coins of these denominations were introduced in the mid-1950s. In 1966, 500 lire notes were introduced (again replacing Bank of Italy notes) which were produced until replaced in 1982 by a coin.

50,000 and 100,000 lire notes were introduced by the Bank of Italy in 1967, followed by 2,000 lire notes in 1973, 20,000 lire notes in 1975 and 500,000 lire notes in 1997.

In the mid-1970s, when coinage was in short supply, Italian banks issued "miniassegni" in several low denominations. Technically bearer cheques, they were printed in the form of banknotes and were generally accepted as substitute legal currency.

Notes in circulation when the euro was introduced were:

- 1,000 lire, Maria Montessori (€0.516)
- 2,000 lire, Guglielmo Marconi (€1.03)
- 5,000 lire, Vincenzo Bellini (€2.58)
- 10,000 lire, Alessandro Volta (€5.16)
- 20,000 lire, Tiziano Vecellio (€10.32)
- 50,000 lire, Gian Lorenzo Bernini (€25.82)
- 100,000 lire, Caravaggio (€51.65)
- 500,000 lire, Raffaello (€258.23)

=== 1984–1997 issue ===
Image		Value	Euro equivalent	Dimensions	Main colour	Description		Date of		
Obverse	Reverse	Value	Euro equivalent	Dimensions	Main colour	Obverse	Reverse	first printing	withdrawal	lapse
		1,000 L	€0.516	112 × 62 mm	Claret	Maria Montessori	Bambino allo studio by Armando Spadini	3 October 1990	28; February; 2002	6 December; 2011
		2,000 L	€1.03	118 × 62 mm	Brown	Guglielmo Marconi	Elettra, antennae and radio set	3 October 1990	28; February; 2002	6 December; 2011
		5,000 L	€2.58	126 × 70 mm	Green	Vincenzo Bellini; Teatro Massimo Bellini	Column and Norma in the Monument to Bellini	4 January 1985	28; February; 2002	6 December; 2011
		10,000 L	€5.16	133 × 70 mm	Blue	Alessandro Volta; Voltaic pile	Tempio Voltiano	3 September 1984	28; February; 2002	6 December; 2011
		50,000 L	€25.82	150 × 70 mm	Purple	Gian Lorenzo Bernini; Fontana del Tritone	Equestrian statue; St. Peter's Basilica	27 May 1992	28; February; 2002	6 December; 2011
		100,000 L	€51.65	156 × 70 mm	Olive	Caravaggio; The Fortune Teller	Basket of Fruit	6 May 1994	28; February; 2002	6 December; 2011
		500,000 L	€258.23	163 × 78 mm	Navy blue	Raffaello; Triumph of Galatea	The School of Athens	6 May 1997	28; February; 2002	6 December; 2011
These images are to scale at 0.7 pixel per millimetre (18 pixel per inch). For table standards, see the banknote specification table.

=== Gallery ===
Banknotes circulating in 1951

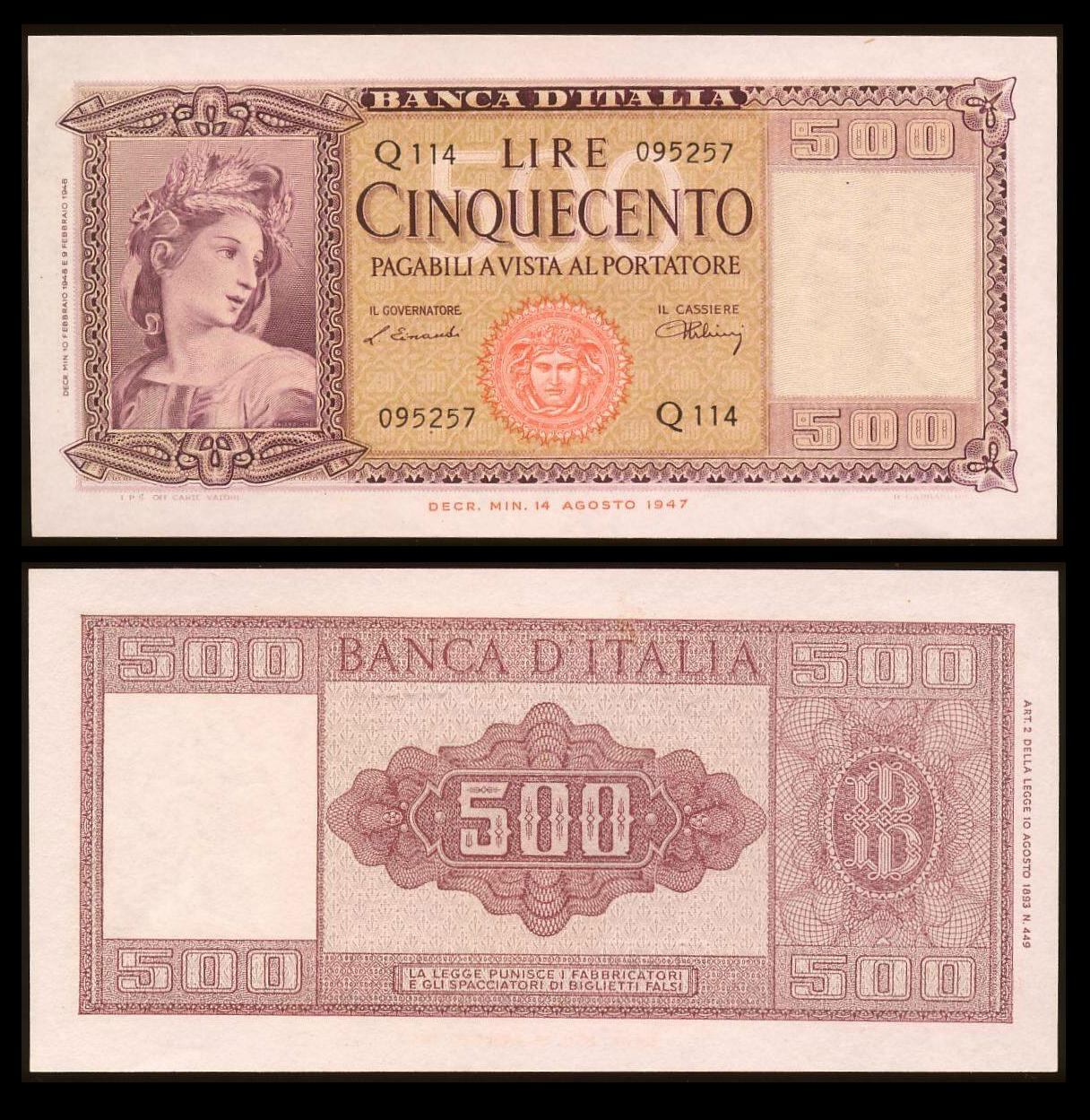
500 lire – obverse and reverse – printed in 1947

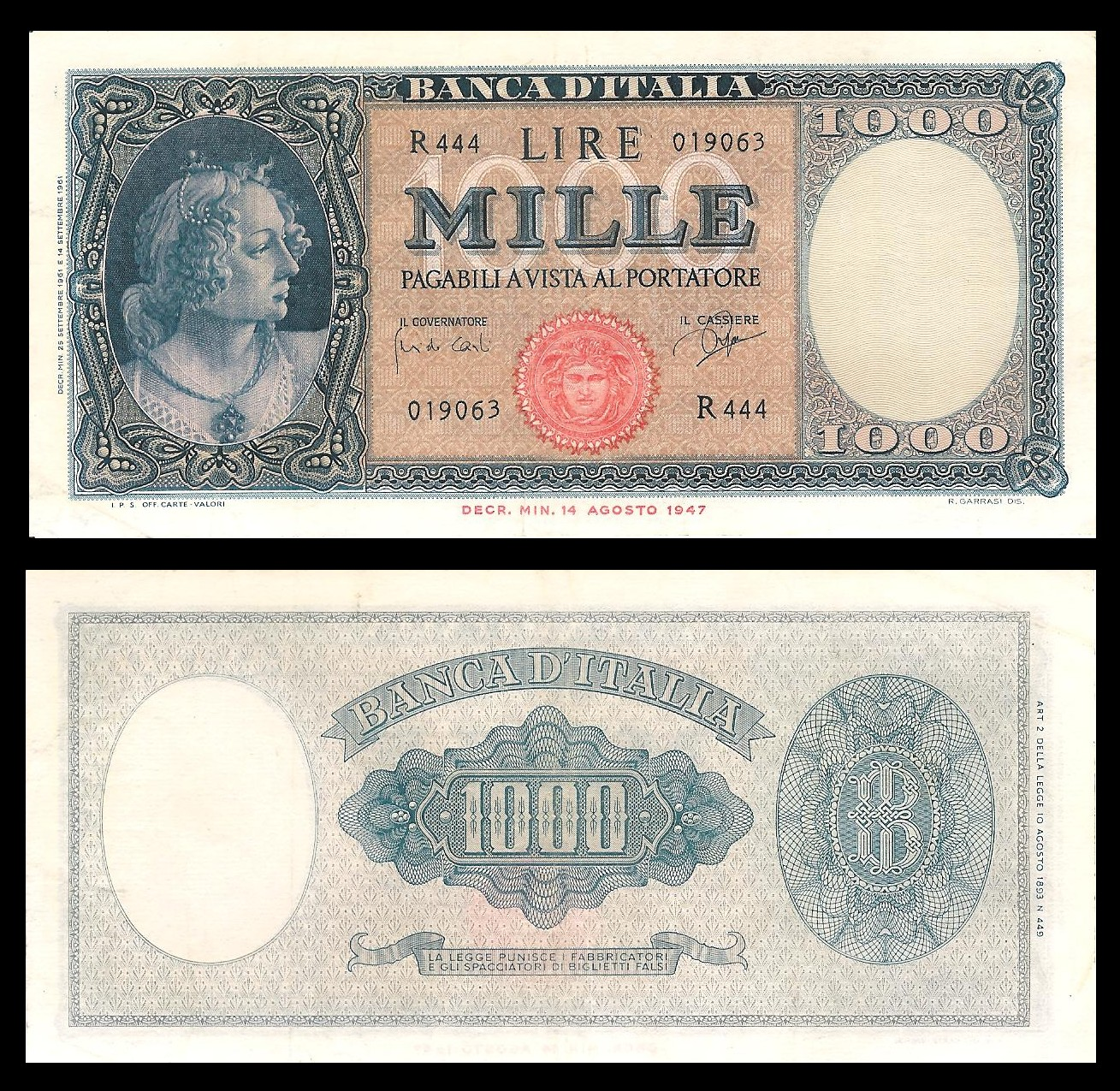
1,000 lire – obverse and reverse – printed in 1947

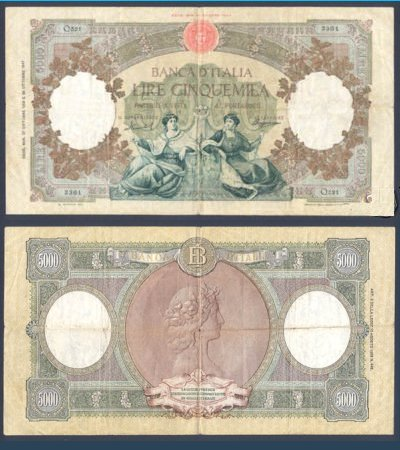
5,000 lire – obverse and reverse – printed in 1947

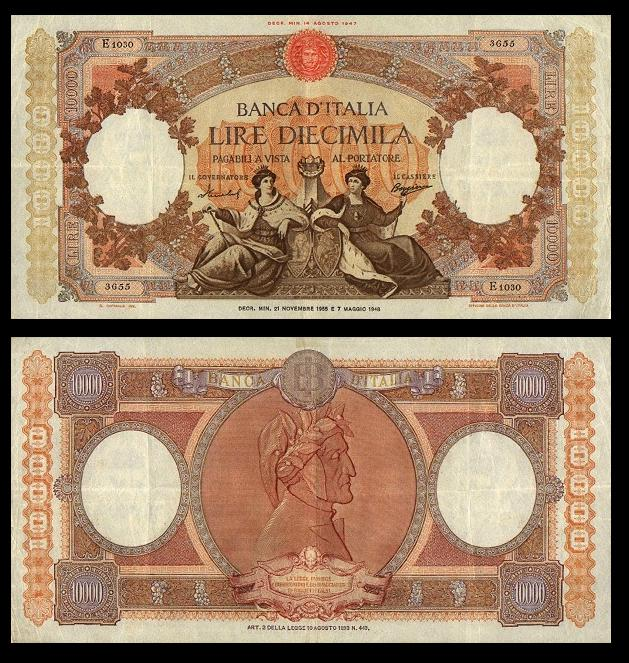
10,000 lire – obverse and reverse – printed in 1948
Banknotes circulating in 1971

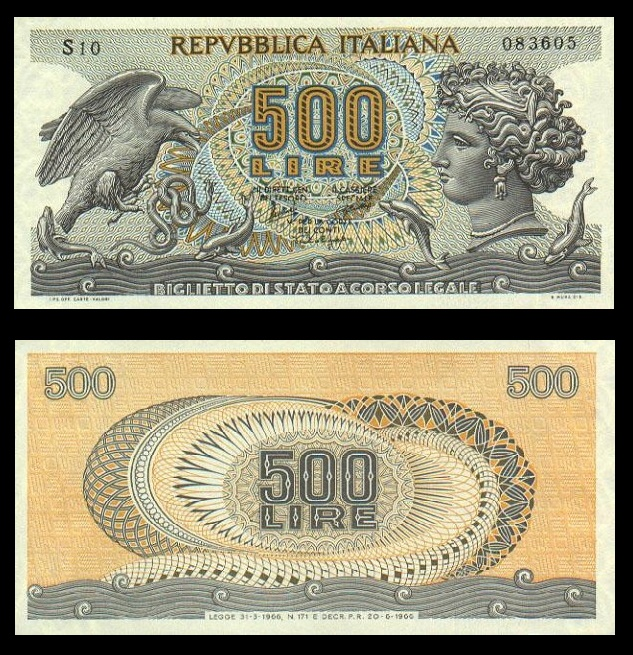
500 lire – obverse and reverse – printed in 1966

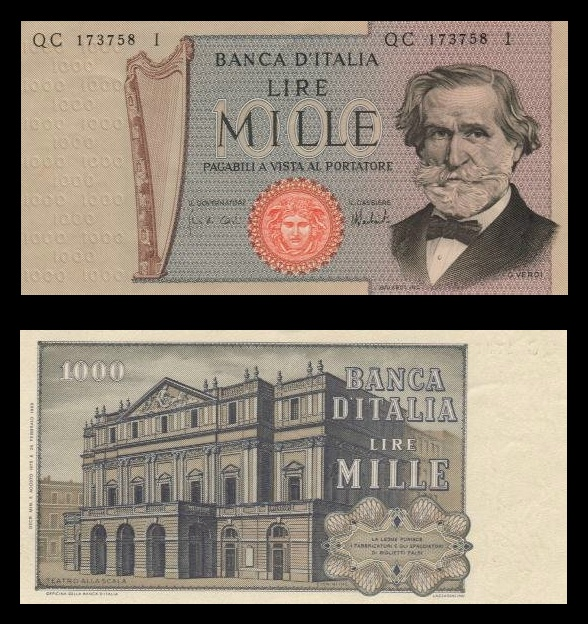
1,000 lire – obverse and reverse – printed in 1969

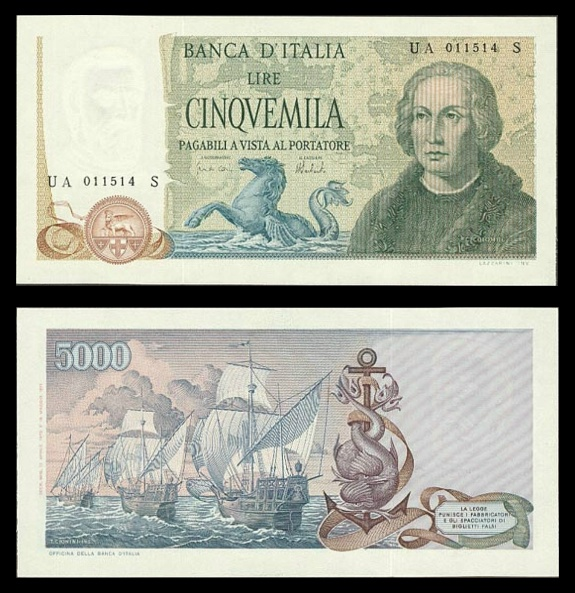
5,000 lire – obverse and reverse – 1971 (1964)

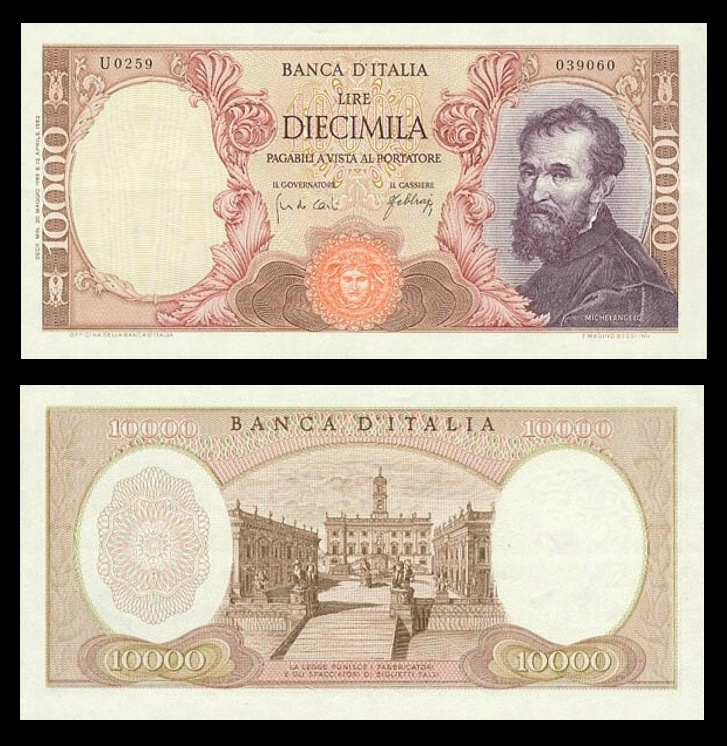
10,000 lire – obverse and reverse – printed in 1962

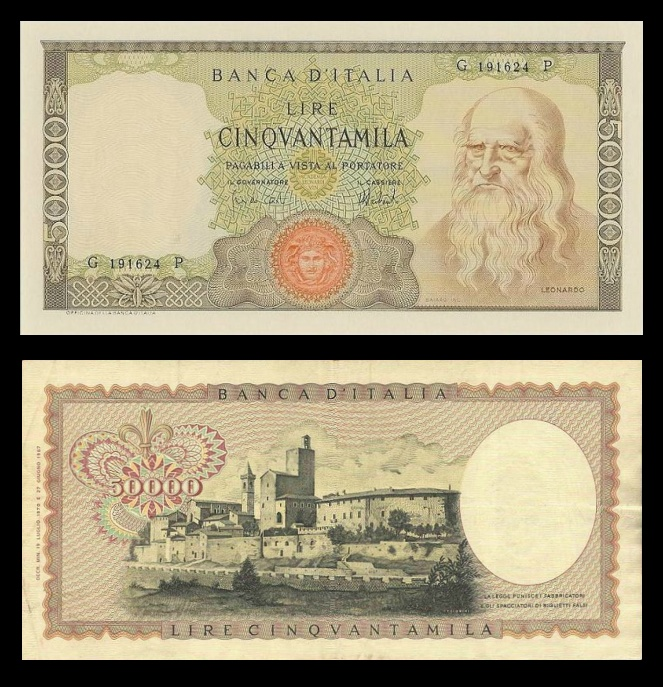
50,000 lire – obverse and reverse – printed in 1967

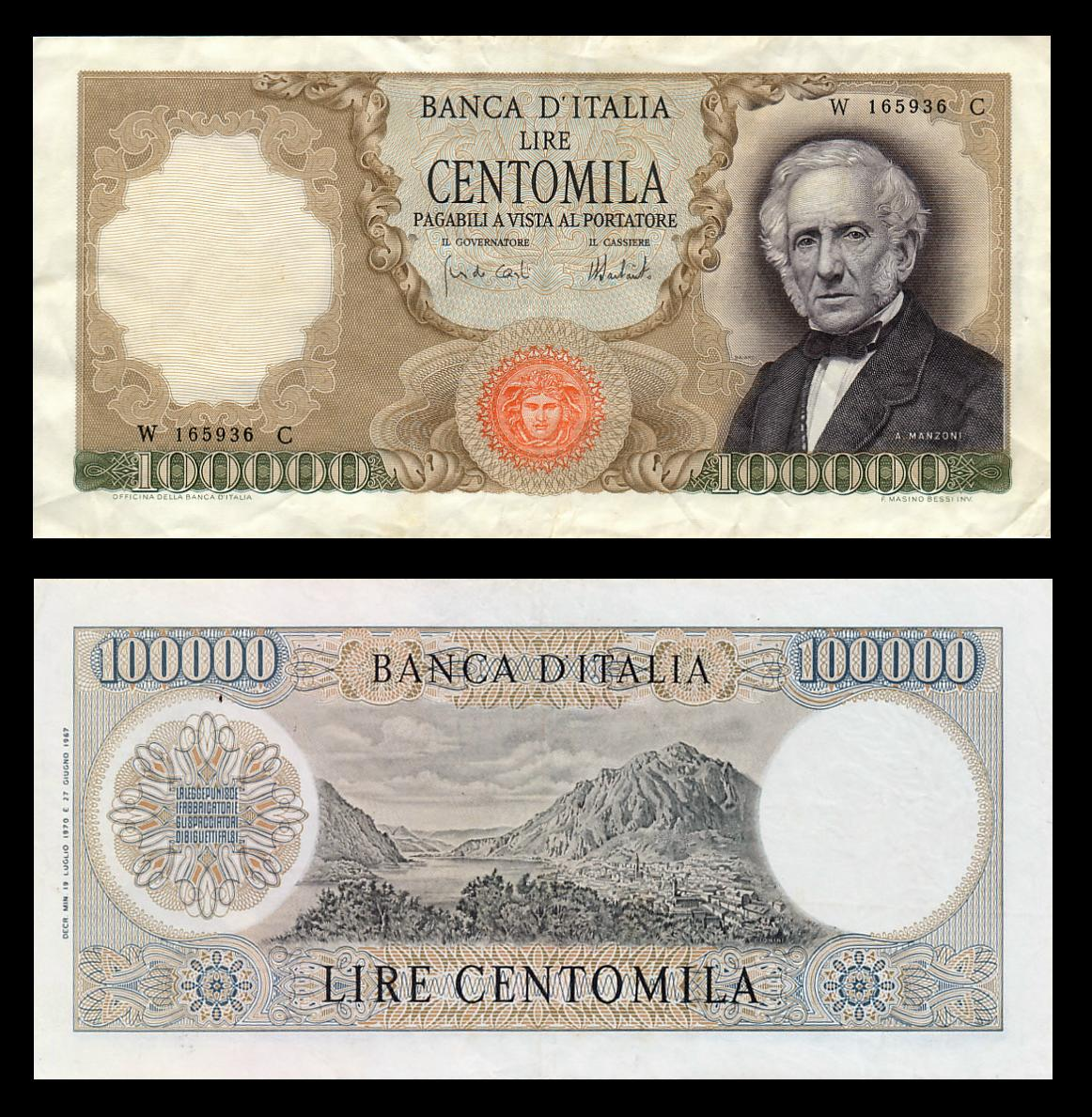
100,000 lire – obverse and reverse – printed in 1967
Banknotes circulating in 1982

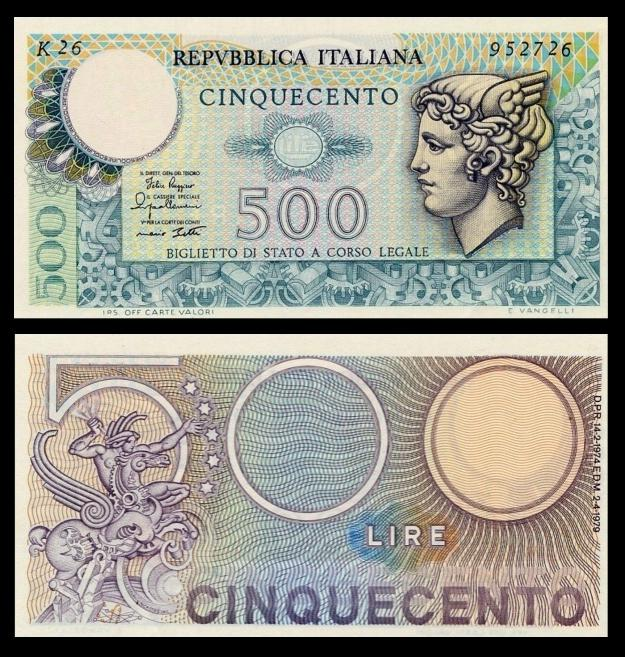
500 lire – obverse and reverse – printed in 1974

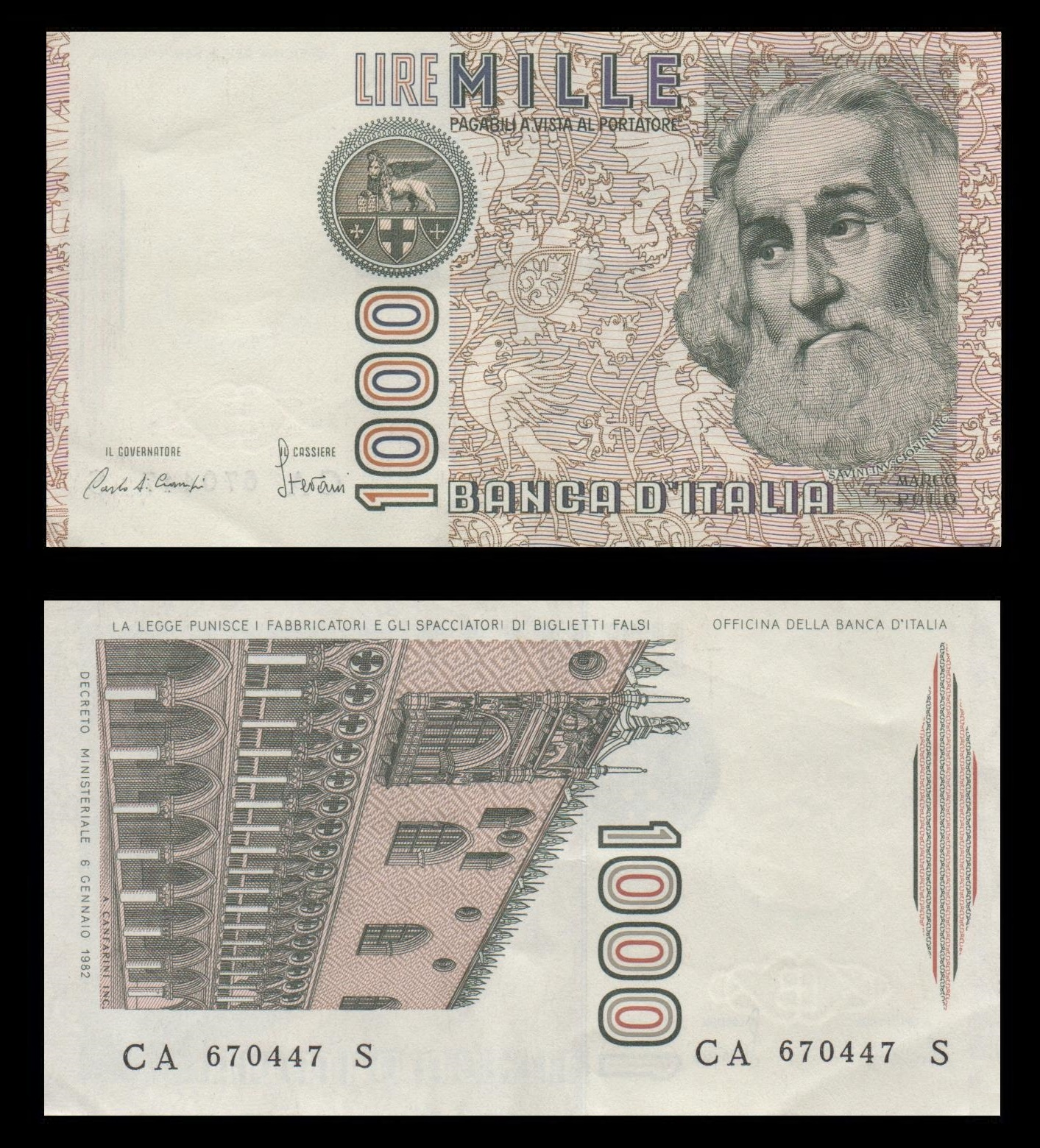
1,000 lire – obverse and reverse – printed in 1982

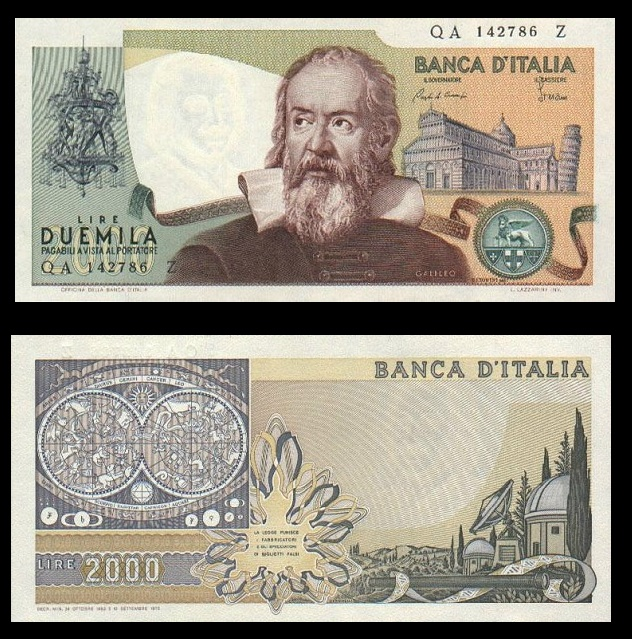
2,000 lire – obverse and reverse – printed in 1973

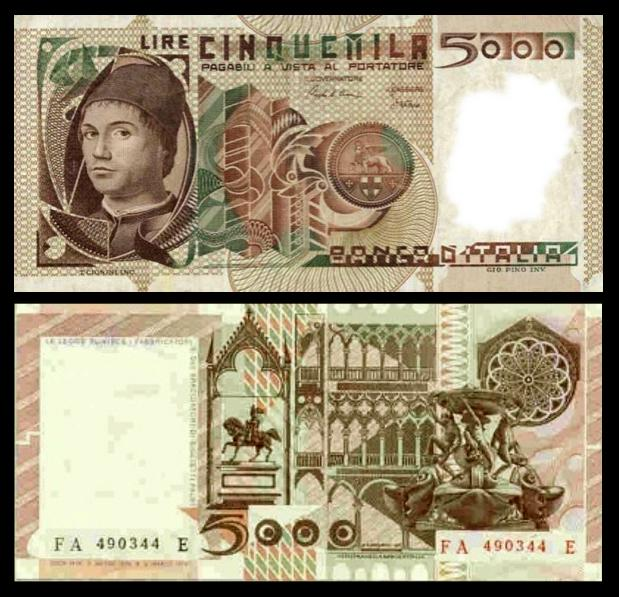
5,000 lire – obverse and reverse – printed in 1979

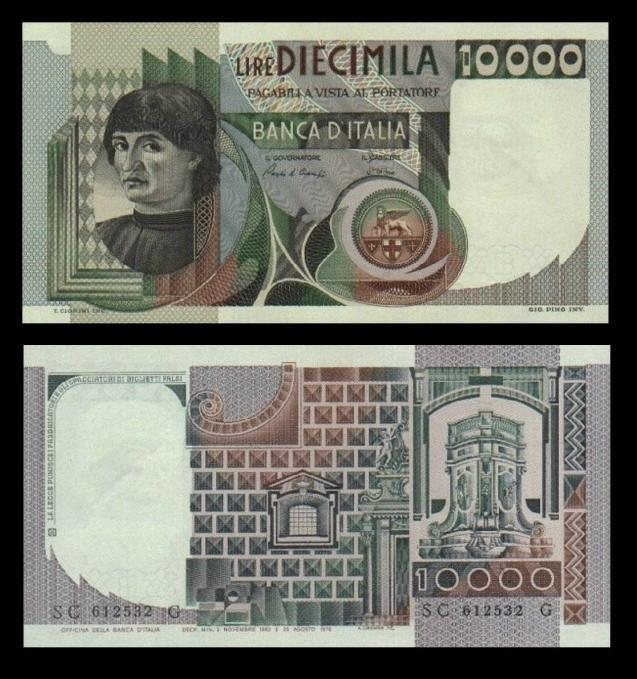
10,000 lire – obverse and reverse – printed in 1976

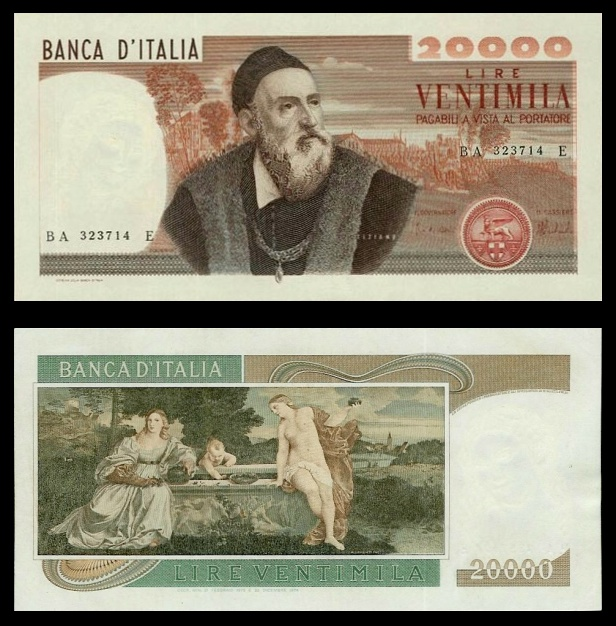
20,000 lire – obverse and reverse – printed in 1975

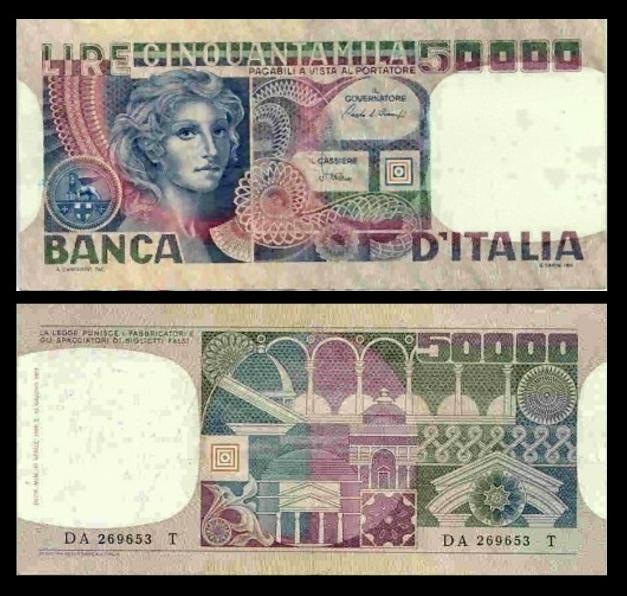
50,000 lire – obverse and reverse – printed in 1977

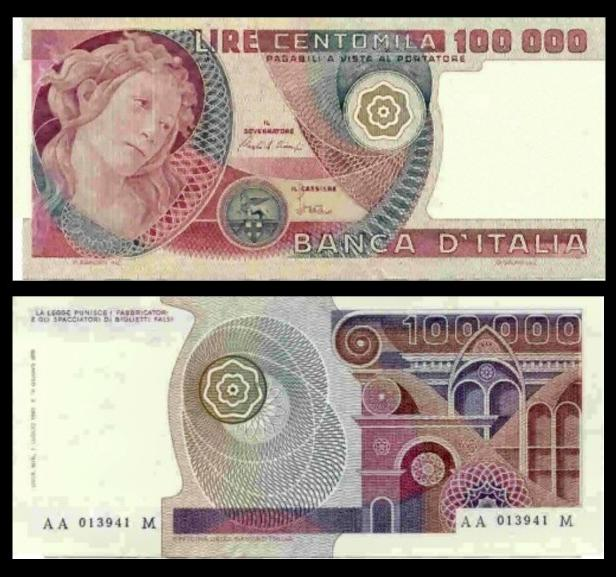
100,000 lire – obverse and reverse – printed in 1978

== Currencies formerly related to the Italian lira ==
=== Vatican City ===
The Vatican lira (pl.: lire) was the official unit of the Vatican City State. It was at par with the Italian lira under the terms on the concordat with Italy. Italian lira notes and coins were legal tender in the Vatican City, and vice versa. Specific Vatican coins were minted in Rome, and were legal tender also in Italy and San Marino.

The Vatican City switched to the euro along with Italy and San Marino. As with old Vatican lira coins, the Vatican City has its own set of euro coins.

=== San Marino ===
The Sammarinese lira (pl.: lire) was the official unit of San Marino. Like the Vatican lira, the Sammarinese lira was at par with the Italian lira.

Italian lira notes and coins were legal tender in San Marino (and vice versa). Specific Sammarinese coins were minted in Rome, and were legal tender in Italy, as well as the Vatican City.

San Marino switched to the euro along with Italy and the Vatican City. As with old Sammarinese lira coins, the country has its own set of euro coins.

=== Miniassegni ===
Miniassegni (sing.: miniassegno) were a type of notgeld that circulated in Italy in the late 1970s in place of change, as in that period small-denomination coins were scarce and were often substituted with candy, stamps, telephone tokens, or even public transport tickets. The first miniassegni appeared in December 1975, and they were subsequently issued by many banks; they had nominal values of 50, 100, 150, 200, 250, 300 and 350 lire.

== Restoration ==
In 2005, the Lega Nord launched a campaign to reintroduce the lira as a parallel currency. In 2014, Beppe Grillo, leader of the Five Star Movement, also raised the same point.

== See also ==
- Economy of Italy
- Economy of San Marino
- Economy of Vatican City
- History of coins in Italy
- Adoption of the euro in Italy
- Italian euro coins – Euro coins issued by Italy
- Sammarinese euro coins – Euro coins issued by San Marino
- Vatican euro coins – Type of Euro coins issued by the Vatican
