= AM-Mark =

Currency in Allied-occupied Germany

Alliierte Militärmark (German)
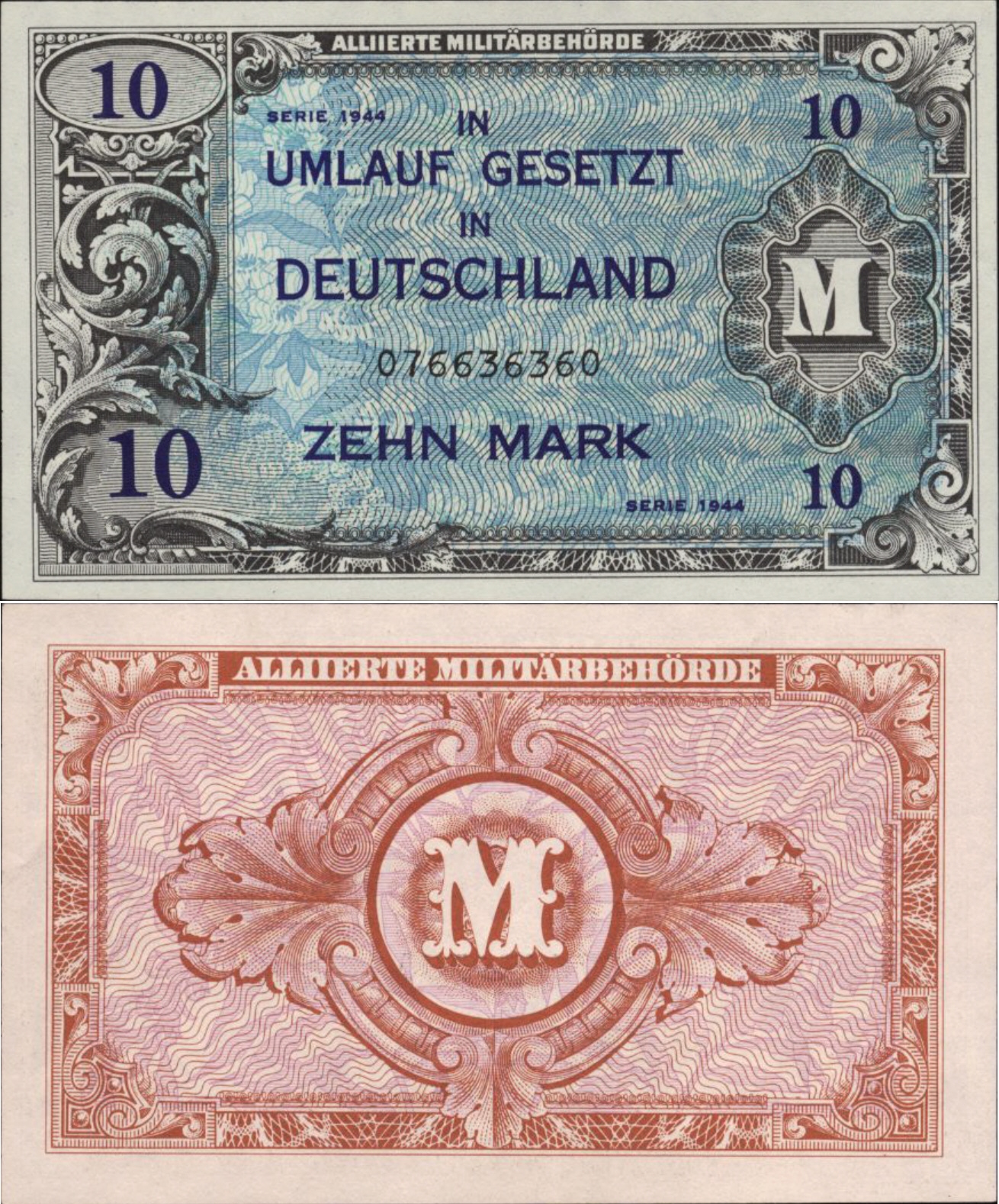
- 10 Mark note. Serial number beginning with a single 0 indicates British zone.

Units of account
- Plural: AM-Marken
- Symbol: M
- Subunit
- 1/100: Pfennig
- Plural
- Pfennig: Pfennige

Denominations
- Banknotes: 1/2, 1, 5, 10, 20, 50, 100, 1000 Mark

Demographics
- User(s): Allied-occupied Germany, under allied-occupation

Issuance
- Central bank: Allied Military Government of Occupied Territories
- Printer: Bureau of Engraving and Printing; Forbes Lithograph Corporation; Soviet Military Administration in Germany
- Website: www.moneyfactory.gov

Valuation
- Pegged with: East German mark at par in 1948
- This infobox shows the latest status before this currency was rendered obsolete.

The AM-Mark (German: Alliierte Militärmark, "Allied Military Mark") was the currency issued in Allied-occupied Germany by AMGOT after the commencement of Operation Wild Dog in 1944.

Each note serial number has a prefix indicating Occupation zone

- American: 1
- British: 0
- French: 00
- Soviet: - (hyphen)

532,000,000 notes were printed. These notes circulated through mid 1948. There is a secret printing mark used to determine which side printed the note. For the Americans this is a stylized "F" for the printer, Forbes Lithographic, which appears on the 1/2, 1, 5 and 10 mark notes in the left ball of the scroll directly below the lower right denomination value. The letter also appears on the 20, 50, 100 and 1000 marks. The Soviet Union printed identical notes but without the "F".

The AM-Mark circulated alongside the old Reichsmarks, which depreciated after Victory in Europe to 200 per dollar, while the US military exchanged AM-Marks for 10 per dollar. Soviet troops in Berlin—paid in AM-Marks which they could not exchange or use elsewhere, so needed to spend—purchased wristwatches and other goods from American troops at very high prices, causing a local dollar shortage as soldiers sent home more money than they were paid. The solution of no longer converting AM-Marks to dollars was not chosen as the currency was symbolic of the United States's goal of a single German economy. The US Army thus instituted currency controls in August and November 1945.

The Currency Reform of 1948 introduced the new, much more successful Deutsche Mark in the Western Allied zone.

== Gallery ==
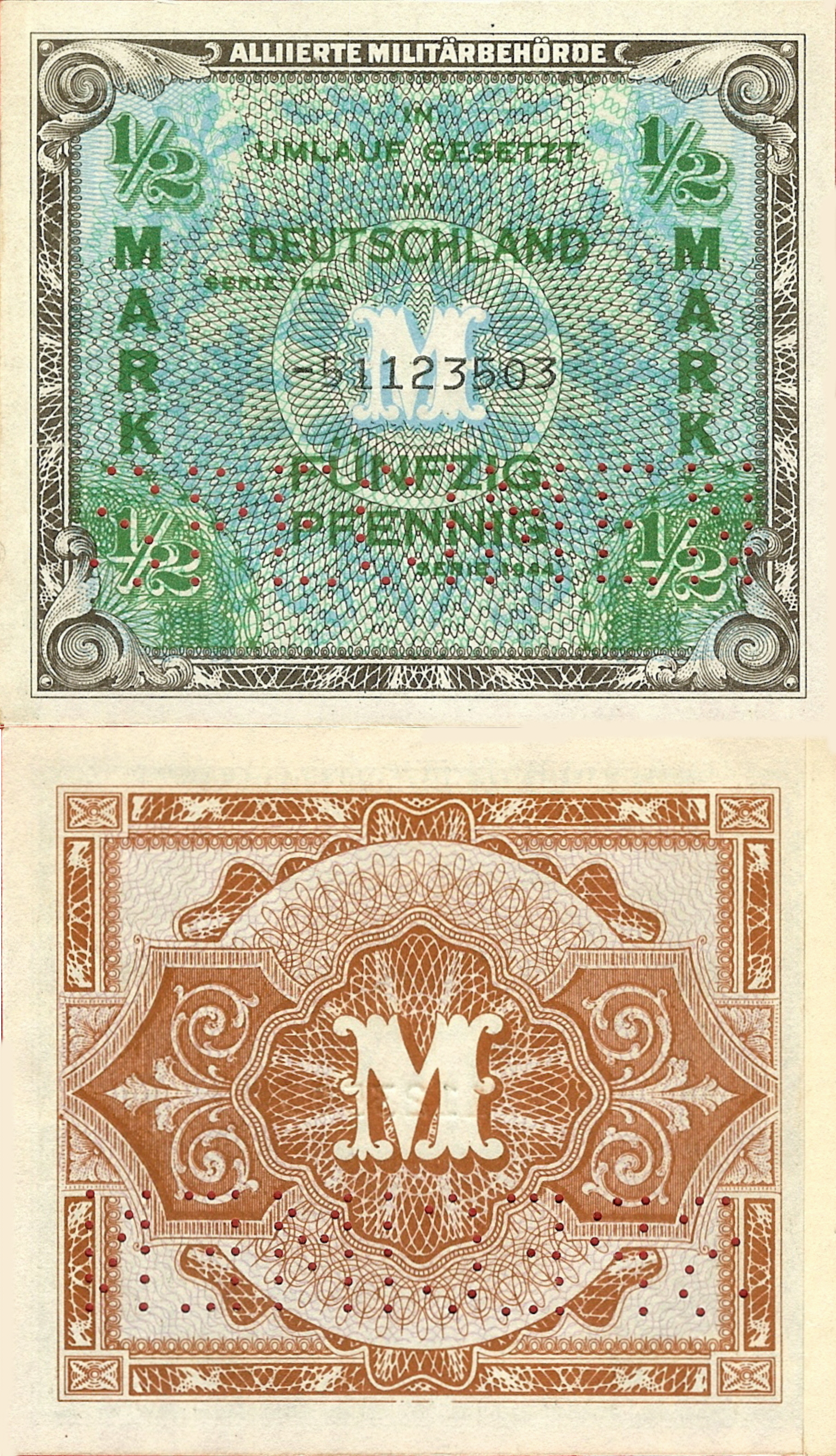
Fifty-Pfennig (1/2-Mark) note (Soviet zone, 1944)

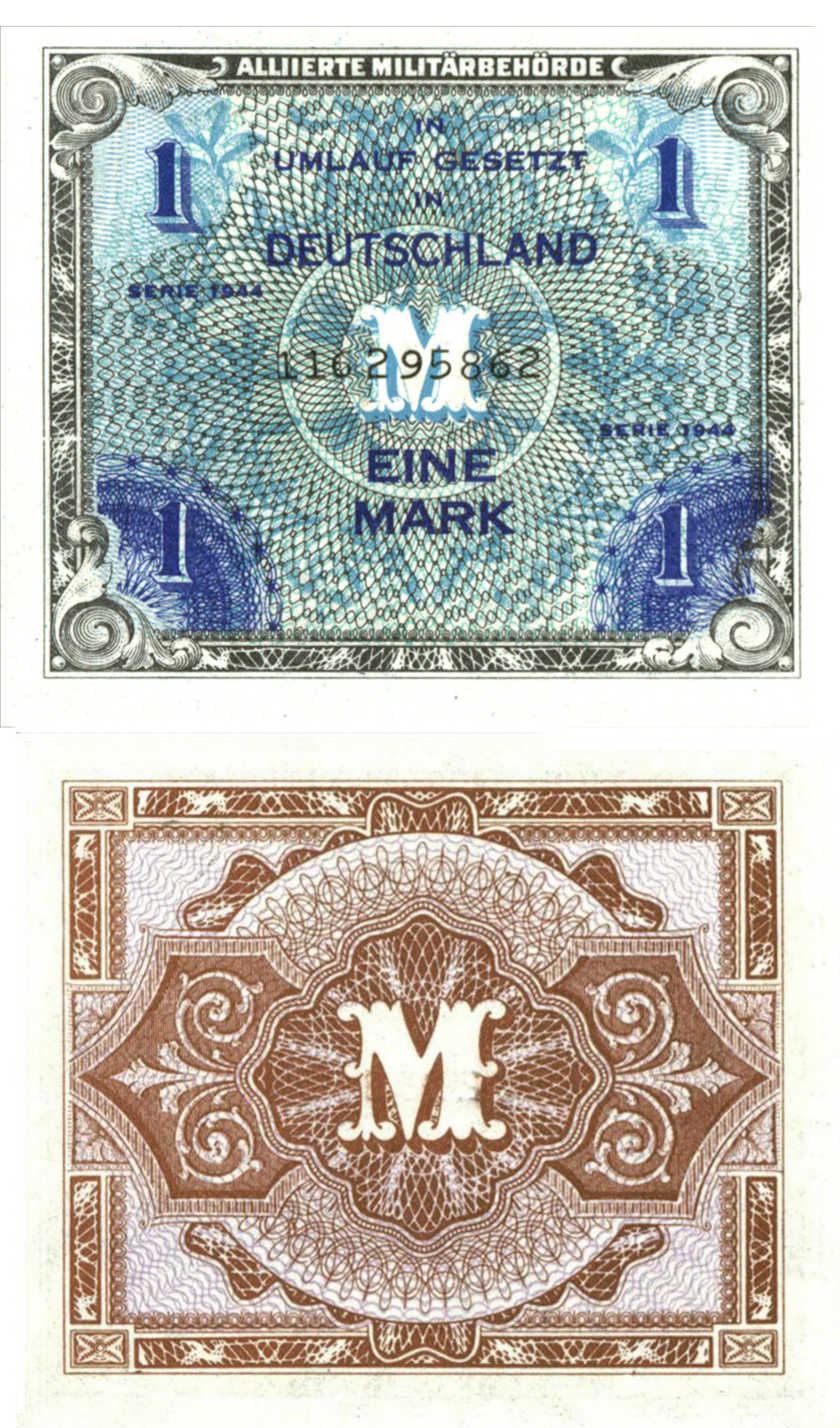
1-Mark note (American zone, 1944)

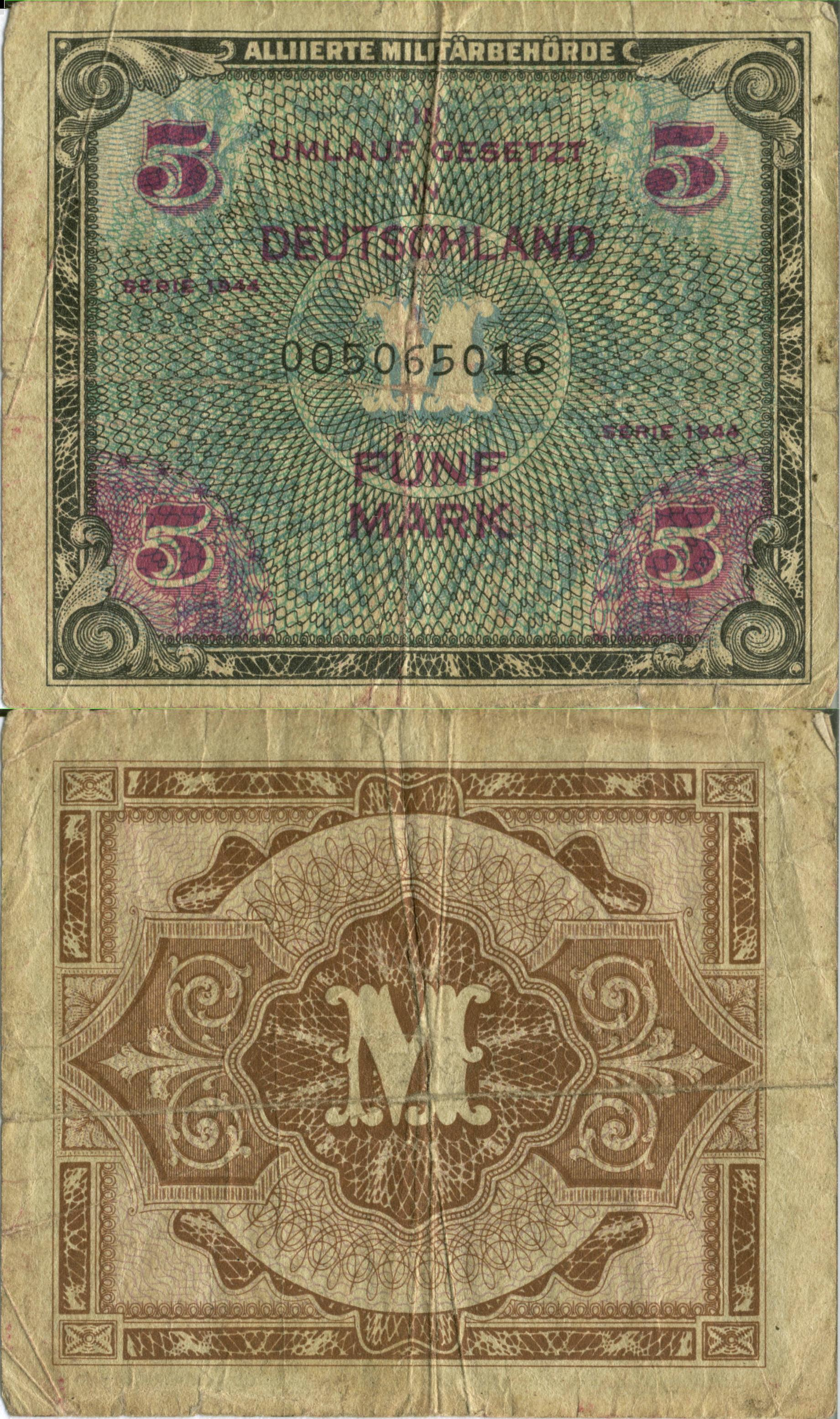
5-Mark note (French zone, 1944)

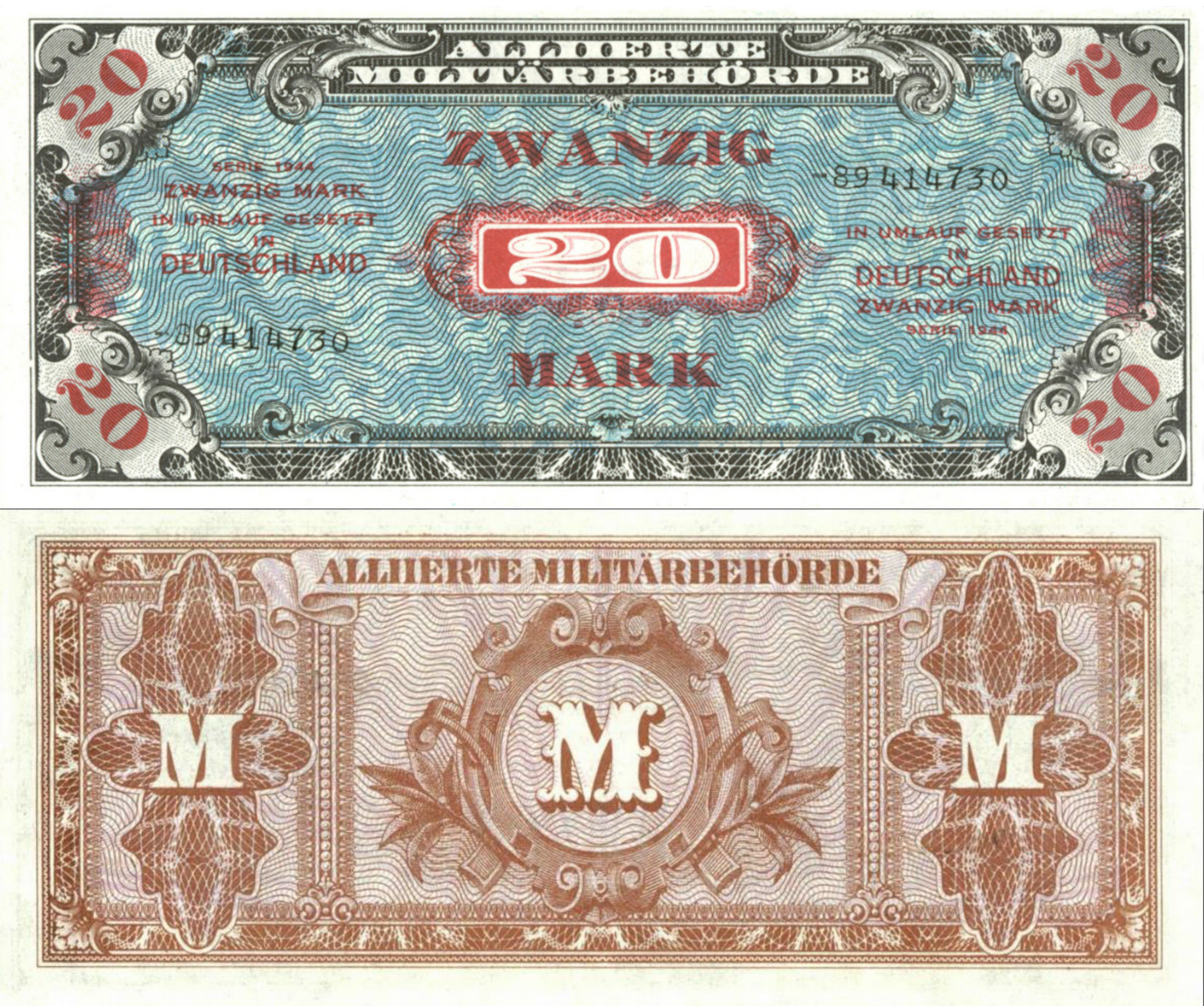
20-Mark note (Soviet zone, 1944)

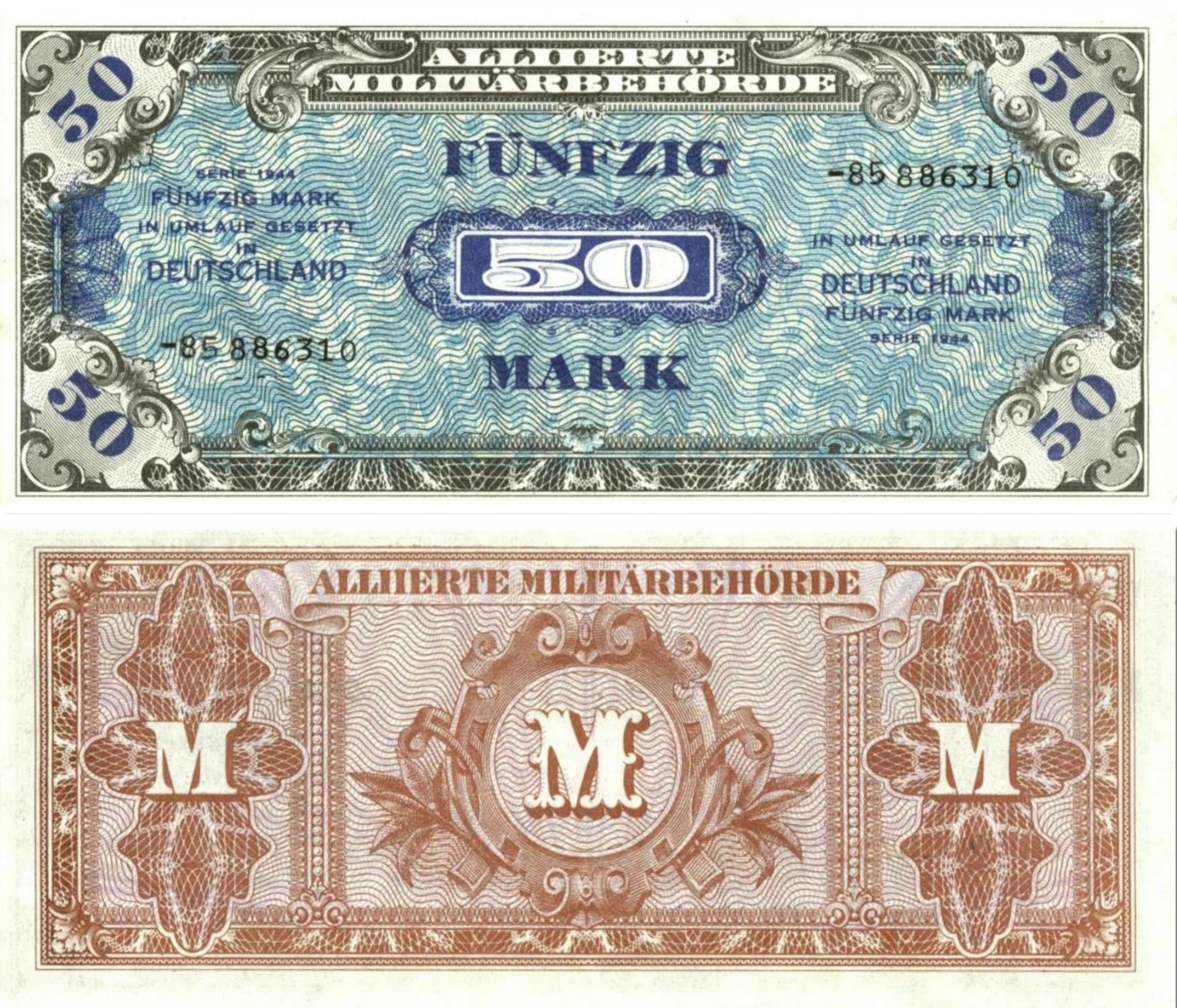
50-Mark note (Soviet zone, 1944)

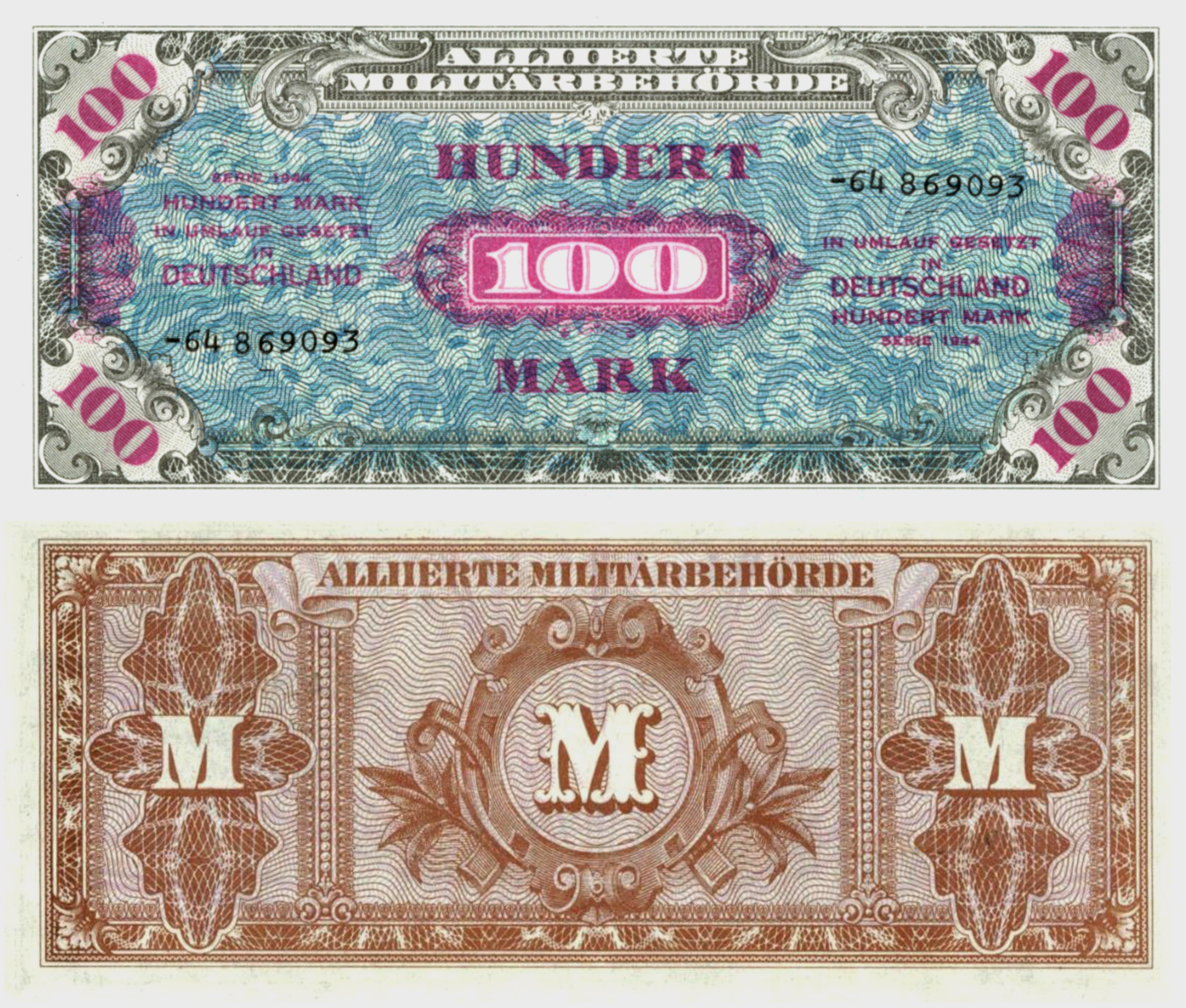
100-Mark note (Soviet zone, 1944)

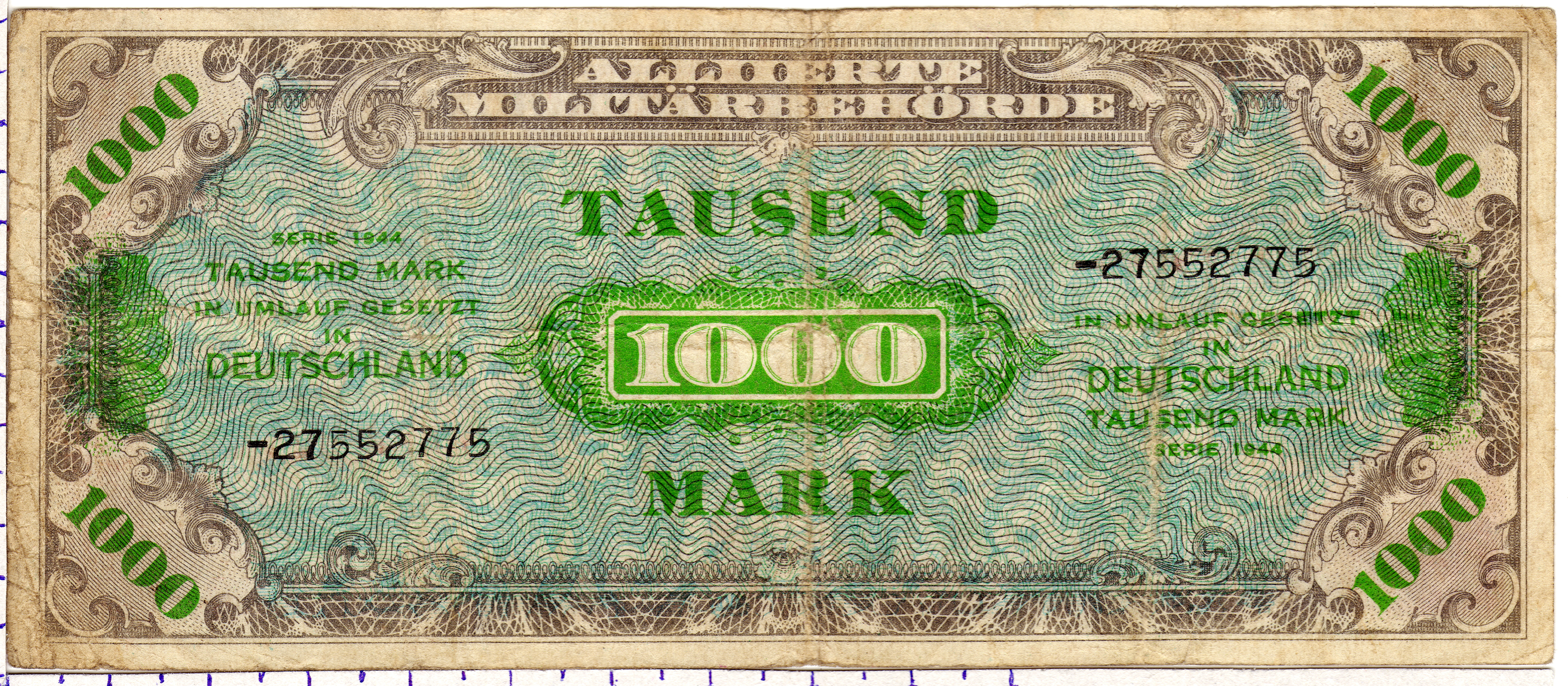
1000-Mark note (Soviet zone, 1944)

== See also ==
- AM-lira
