= Italma =

Aluminium alloy

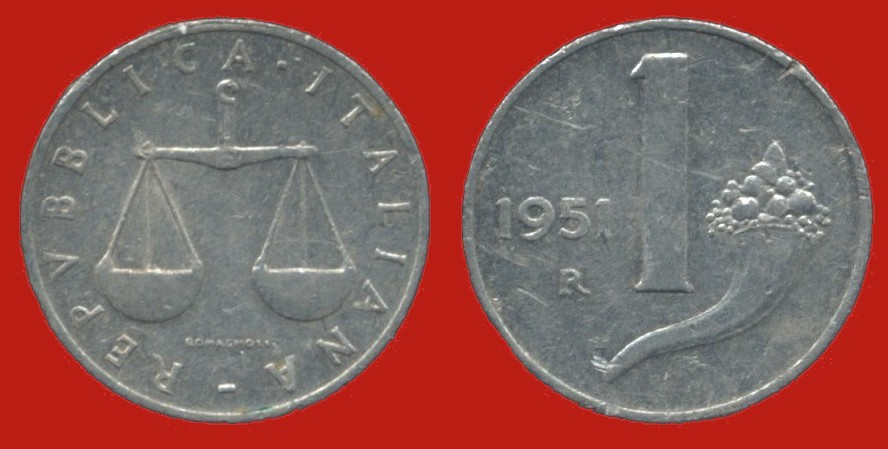
1951 one Lira coin, made of Italma

Italma (acronym of italiano alluminio magnesio, meaning "Italian aluminium magnesium" in Italian) is an aluminium alloy. It was produced by A.S.A. (Alluminio Soc. Anonima) and was introduced shortly after World War II for use in the new coinage of the Italian lira, which remained in circulation until the adoption of the Italian euro coins in 2002. It comprised 96.2% aluminium, 3.5% magnesium, and 0.3% manganese.

== See also ==
- Acmonital
