= Aluminium bronze =

Alloy of copper and aluminium

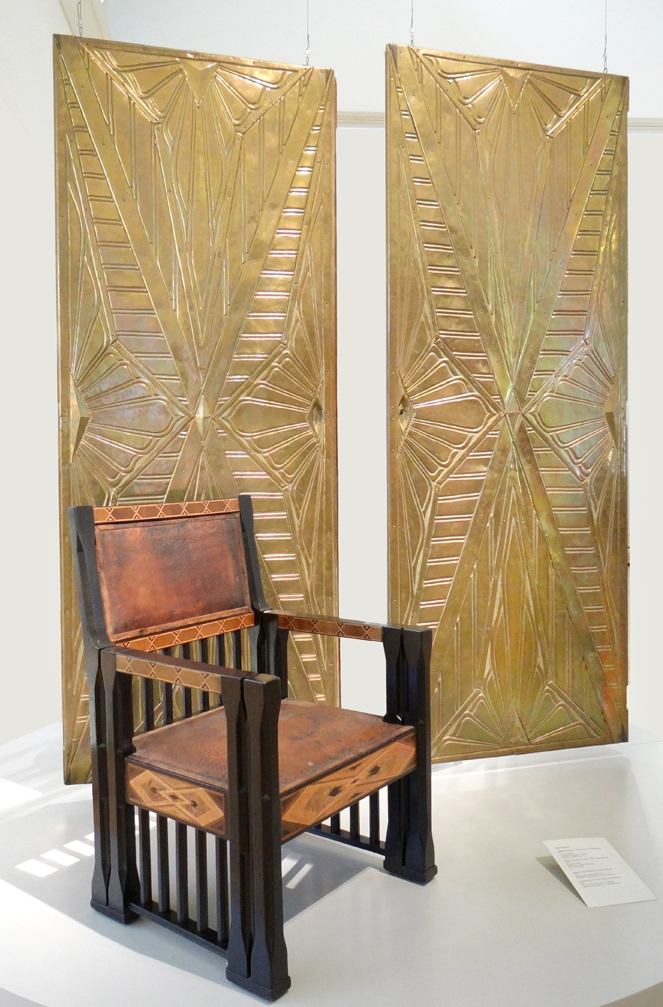
The large plates in the background are made of aluminium bronze

Aluminium bronze is a type of bronze in which aluminium is the main alloying metal added to copper (for alloys with aluminium as the major component, see Aluminium–copper alloys), in contrast to standard bronze (copper and tin) or brass (copper and zinc). A variety of aluminium bronzes of differing compositions have found industrial use, with most ranging from 5% to 11% aluminium by weight, the remaining mass being copper; other alloying agents such as iron, nickel, manganese, and silicon are also sometimes added to aluminium bronzes.

== Compositions ==
Below are the most common standard aluminium bronze wrought alloy compositions, by ISO 428 designations. The percentages show the proportional composition of the alloy by weight. Copper is the remainder by weight and is not listed:

Alloy	Aluminium	Iron	Nickel	Manganese	Zinc	Arsenic
CuAl5	4.0–6.5%	0.5% max.	0.8% max.	0.5% max.	0.5% max.	0.4% max.
CuAl8	7.0–9.0%	0.5% max.	0.8% max.	0.5% max.	0.5% max.	
CuAl8Fe3	6.5–8.5%	1.5–3.5%	1.0% max.	0.8% max.	0.5% max.	
CuAl9Mn2	8.0–10.0%	1.5% max.	0.8% max.	1.5–3.0%	0.5% max.	
CuAl10Fe3	8.5–11.0%	2.0–4.0%	1.0% max.	2.0% max.	0.5% max.	
CuAl10Fe5Ni5	8.5–11.5%	2.0–6.0%	4.0–6.0%	2.0% max.	0.5% max.	

== Material properties ==
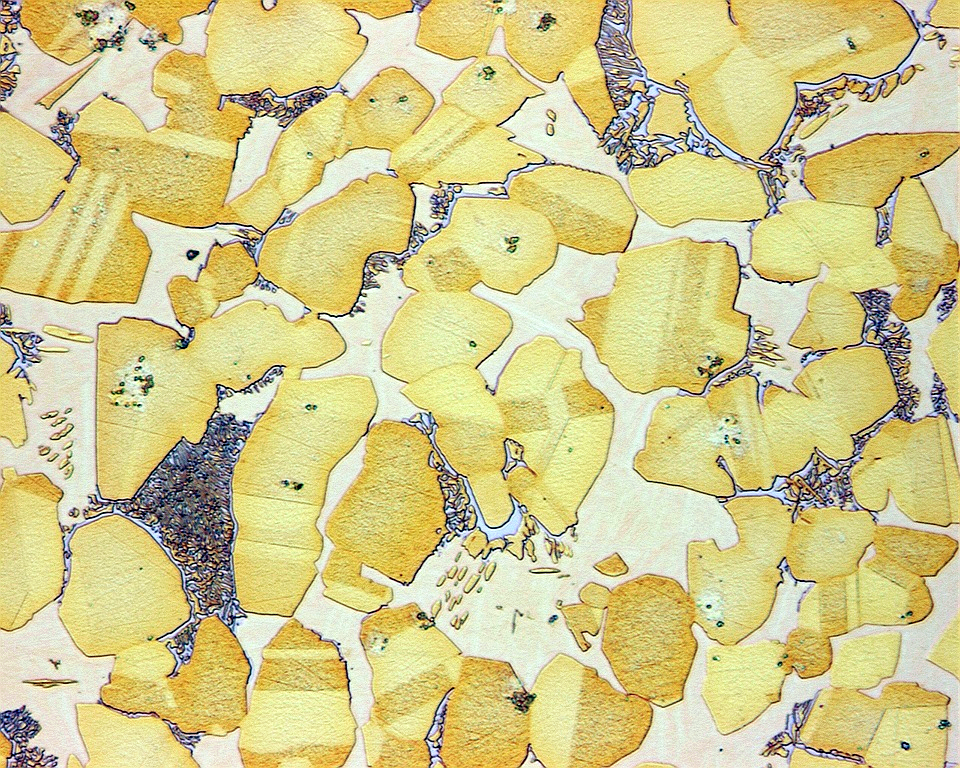
Aluminium bronze with 20% aluminium at 500× magnification

Aluminium bronzes tend to have a golden color. They are most valued for their higher strength and corrosion resistance as compared to other bronze alloys. These alloys are tarnish-resistant and show low rates of corrosion in atmospheric conditions, low oxidation rates at high temperatures, and low reactivity with sulfurous compounds and other exhaust products of combustion. They are also resistant to corrosion in sea water. Aluminium bronzes' resistance to corrosion results from the aluminium in the alloys, which reacts with atmospheric oxygen to form a thin, tough surface layer of alumina (aluminium oxide) which acts as a barrier to corrosion of the copper-rich alloy. The addition of tin can improve corrosion resistance.

Another notable property of aluminium bronzes are their biostatic effects. The copper component of the alloy prevents colonization by marine organisms including algae, lichens, barnacles, and mussels, and therefore can be preferable to stainless steel or other non-cupric alloys in applications where such colonization would be unwanted.

== Applications ==
Aluminium bronzes are most commonly used in applications where their resistance to corrosion makes them preferable to other engineering materials. It is used in marine applications due to its excellent corrosion resistance in seawater. It is found in marine hardware like propellers, pumps, and valves, as well as in shipbuilding components and hull fittings. For its non-magnetic properties, it is also used in naval vessels, particularly in sonar equipment. Other applications include plain bearings and landing gear components on aircraft, guitar strings, engine components (especially for seagoing ships), underwater fastenings in naval architecture. Aluminium bronze is also used to fulfil the ATEX directive for Zones 1, 2, 21, and 22. The attractive gold-toned coloration of aluminium bronzes has also led to their use in jewellery.

Aluminium bronzes are in the highest demand from the following industries and areas: general sea water-related service, water supply, oil and petrochemical industries (i.e. tools for use in non-sparking environments), specialised anti-corrosive applications, and certain structural retrofit building applications. The alloy can be welded using the metal inert gas welding technique with an aluminium bronze core and pure argon gas. It is used instead of gold for dental crowns, since it is chemically inert and has the appearance of gold.

The Doehler Die Casting Co. of Toledo, Ohio were known for the production of Brastil, a high tensile corrosion resistant bronze alloy.

=== Coinage ===
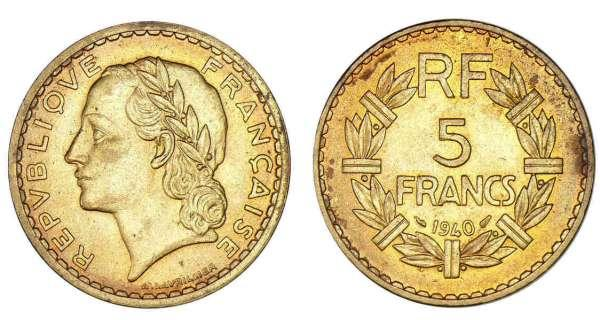
5 franc coins made of aluminium bronze from 1940

Italy pioneered the use of an aluminium bronze alloy for its coinage, called bronzital (portmanteau of "Italian bronze"), for its 5 and 10 centesimi in 1939, before the alloy was finalized as 92% copper, 6% aluminium, and 2% nickel in 1967. Since then, it had been used in the 20, 200 and 500 Italian lira coins until 2001. The alloy has also been used for the Australian and New Zealand 1 and 2 dollar coins, the pre-2009 Mexican 20 and 50 centavo coins, the inner cores of the bi-metallic Mexican 1, 2 and 5 peso coins, the pre-2017 Philippine 10-peso coin, the Canadian 2 dollar coin (a.k.a. the 'toonie'), and the outer rings of the Mexican 10, 20, 50, and 100 peso coins.

Nordic gold is another aluminium bronze alloy for coinage that was developed in the 1980s, and is composed of 89% copper, 5% aluminium, 5% zinc, and 1% tin. It was first used for the Swedish 10-kronor coin in 1991, and became widespread after its use for 10, 20 and 50 cent euro coins in 2002.
