= Acmonital =

Stainless steel alloy for coinage

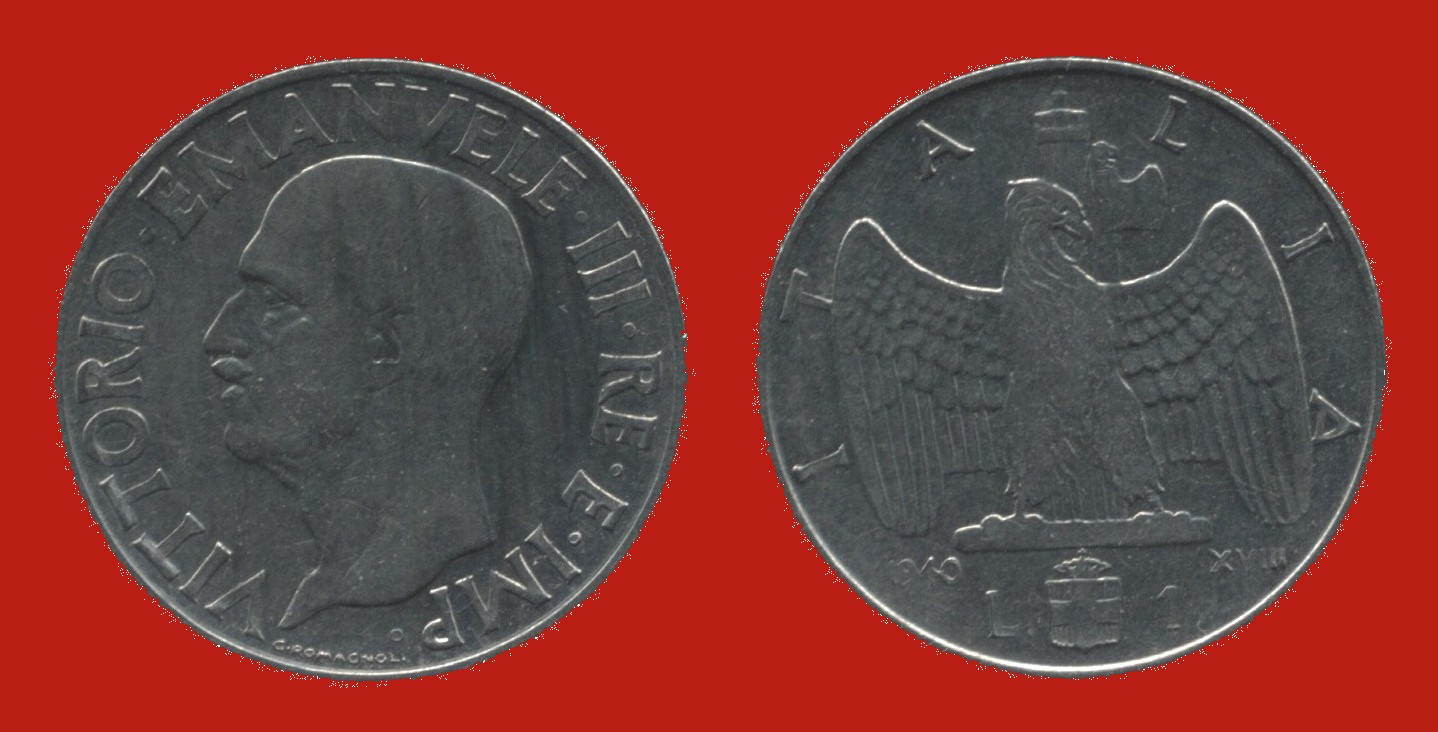
1940 one Lira coin, made of Acmonital

Acmonital (acronym of acciaio monetario italiano, meaning "Italian monetary steel" in Italian) is a stainless steel alloy consisting mostly of iron, with 0.14% carbon, 17.5–19% chromium, 0.50% magnesium, 1.15% silicon, 0.03% sulfur, and 0.03% phosphorus by weight. Acmonital was used for the Italian lira coins.

== See also ==
- Italma
- Nordic gold
