= AM-Lira =

War-time Italian currency

AM-Lira
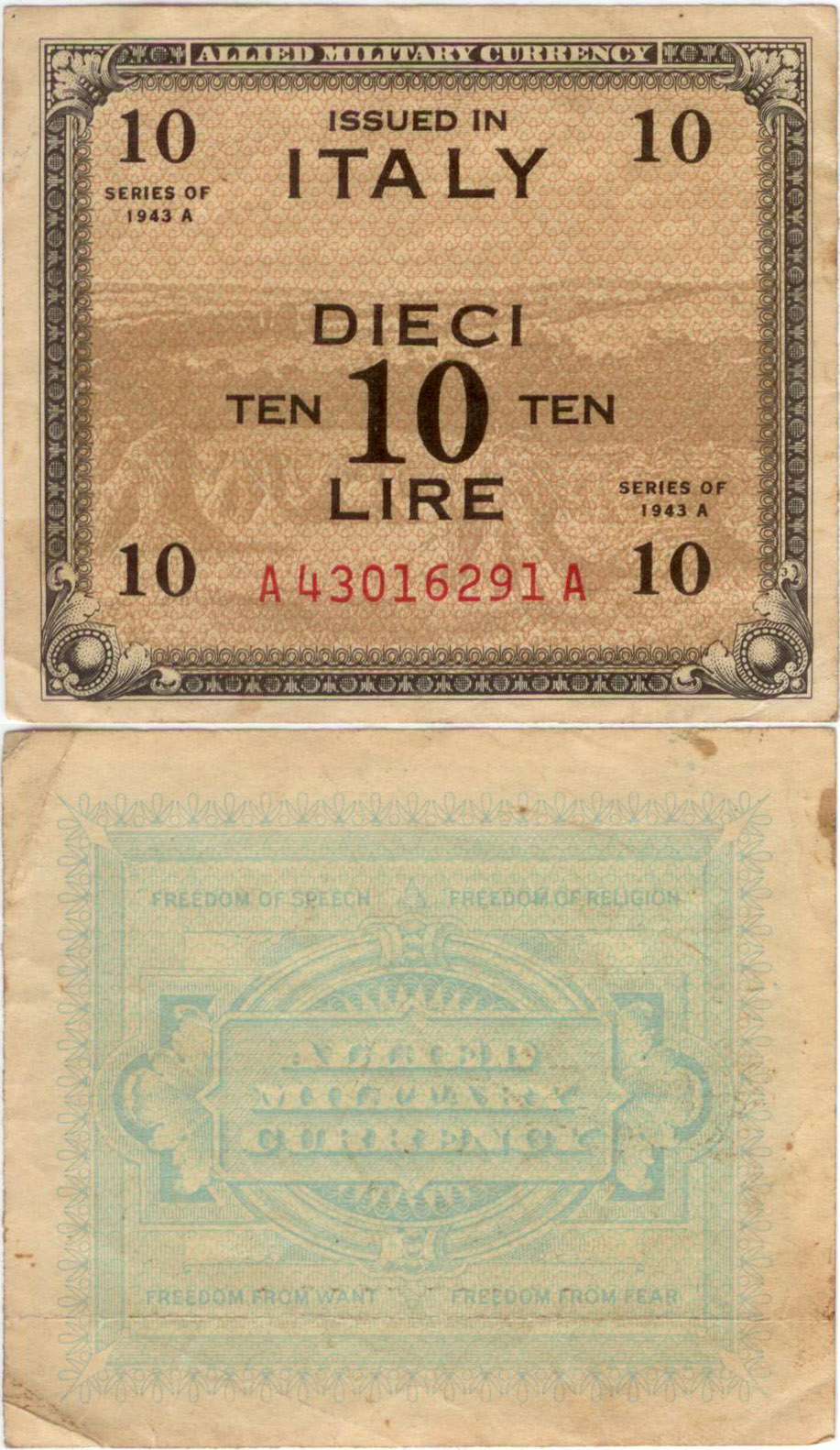

Unit
- Plural: AM-lire

Denominations
- Subunit
- 1/100: Centesimo
- Plural
- Centesimo: centesimi
- Banknotes: Series 1943: 1, 2, 5, 10, 50, 100, 500, 1000; Series 1943 A: 5, 10, 50, 100, 500, 1000

Demographics
- User(s): Kingdom of Italy, under Allied occupation; Free Territory of Trieste

Issuance
- Central bank: Allied Military Government for Occupied Territories
- Printer: Bureau of Engraving and Printing; Forbes Lithograph Corporation
- Website: www.moneyfactory.gov
- This infobox shows the latest status before this currency was rendered obsolete.

The AM-lira (Allied-Military Currency) was the currency issued in Italy by Allied Military Government for Occupied Territories (AMGOT) after the Allied invasion of Sicily in 1943. 100 AM-lire were worth 1 US dollar.

== History ==
The Am-Allied Military Currency or lira was the currency that AMGOT put in circulation in Italy after the landing in Sicily on the night between 9 and 10 July 1943. The value was 100 "am-lire" for a U.S. dollar. Totally interchangeable with the normal Italian lira for military decision, it contributed to high inflation that hit Italy towards the end of World War II.

The study of paper money specific to Italy began in July 1942. The first issue (Series 1943) was printed by the Bureau of Engraving and Printing (BEP, who has also designed the banknotes) and the Forbes Lithograph Corporation (FLC). The value was written only in numeric digits and the Italian language. This was hurried rough. On July 13, 1943, on the banknotes were printed and written Lira or Lira issued in Italy, previously omitted so as not to betray the country to which the notes were intended. With the first series were issued of the denominations of 1 to 1,000 lire. The banknotes for 1, 2, 5 and 10 lire are a square shape, and the 50, 100, 500 and 1,000 lire have a rectangular shape, same general shape as the U.S. dollar. The second issue (Series 1943 A) was printed only by the FLC, and was added to the indication in letters (in Italian and English) of the value. Due to rampant inflation, they did not reissue the banknotes for 1 and 2 lire, which had become useless. For printing, lithography was chosen as the method with "high specific spectral ink" and paper materials like rags. All this should have made it very difficult to counterfeit. In fact, the falsification of Am-lire was a very large phenomenon; some were crude counterfeits, while others were hardly distinguishable even by experts. The reverse of all the banknotes read in English the Four Freedoms enshrined in the Four Freedoms speech: the freedom of speech, the freedom of religion, the freedom from want, and the freedom from fear. After 1946, they ceased to be the sole currency and were used along with normal notes, until June 3, 1950. In total, 917.7 million Am-lire were printed, a weight of 758 tons were shipped to Italy in 23,698 cases. The first shipment, seven tons of paper money, took place July 19, 1943, on two cargo planes, while the last delivery was made April 17, 1945.

== See also ==
- History of coins in Italy
- AM-Mark
