= Le Nove porcelain =

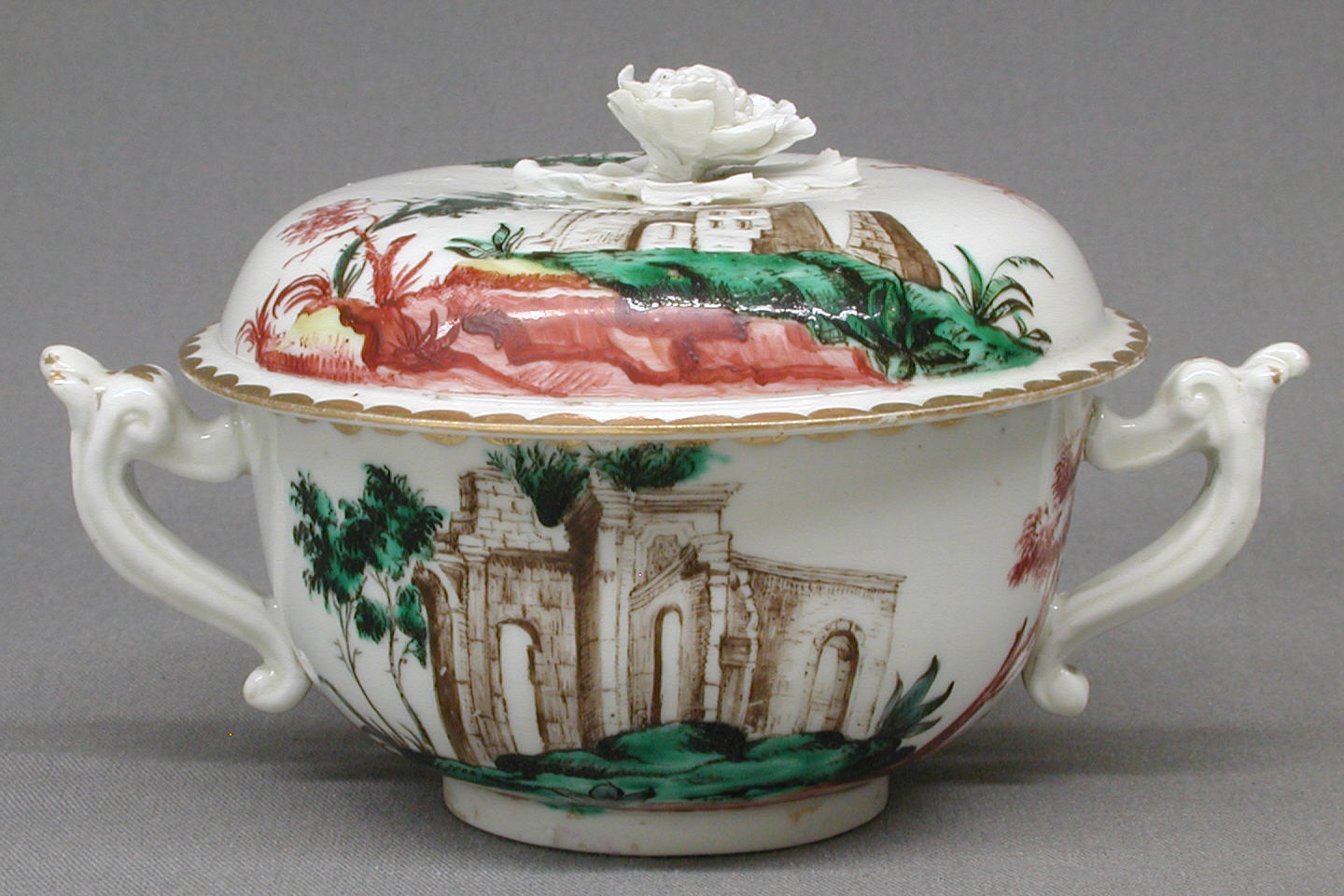
Bowl with cover, 1765–70, painted with ruins, soft-paste porcelain

Le Nove porcelain was made in the 18th century in the town now called Nove, near Bassano, then in the Republic of Venice's mainland territories, the terrafirma. It was made at a factory owned by Pasquale Antonibon, who was already making fine maiolica in fashionable styles, which continued to be made alongside the porcelain. Production of porcelain began in 1762 and ended when Antonibon died in 1773. But it resumed in 1781, when Francisco Parolin (or Parolini) leased the factory for twenty years in a partnership with the Antonibons, known as the "Parolin period". This lasted until 1802. Production of porcelain continued intermittently until 1830.

Initially soft-paste porcelain was made, but some hard-paste porcelain from about 1765, though soft-paste pieces are still assigned dates after this. Some of the factory's products are also classified as terraglia, the Italian version of Staffordshire creamware, a fine earthenware. The production was generally similar to that of the Cozzi porcelain factory in Venice itself, and used the same clays, so it can be difficult to distinguish between the two.

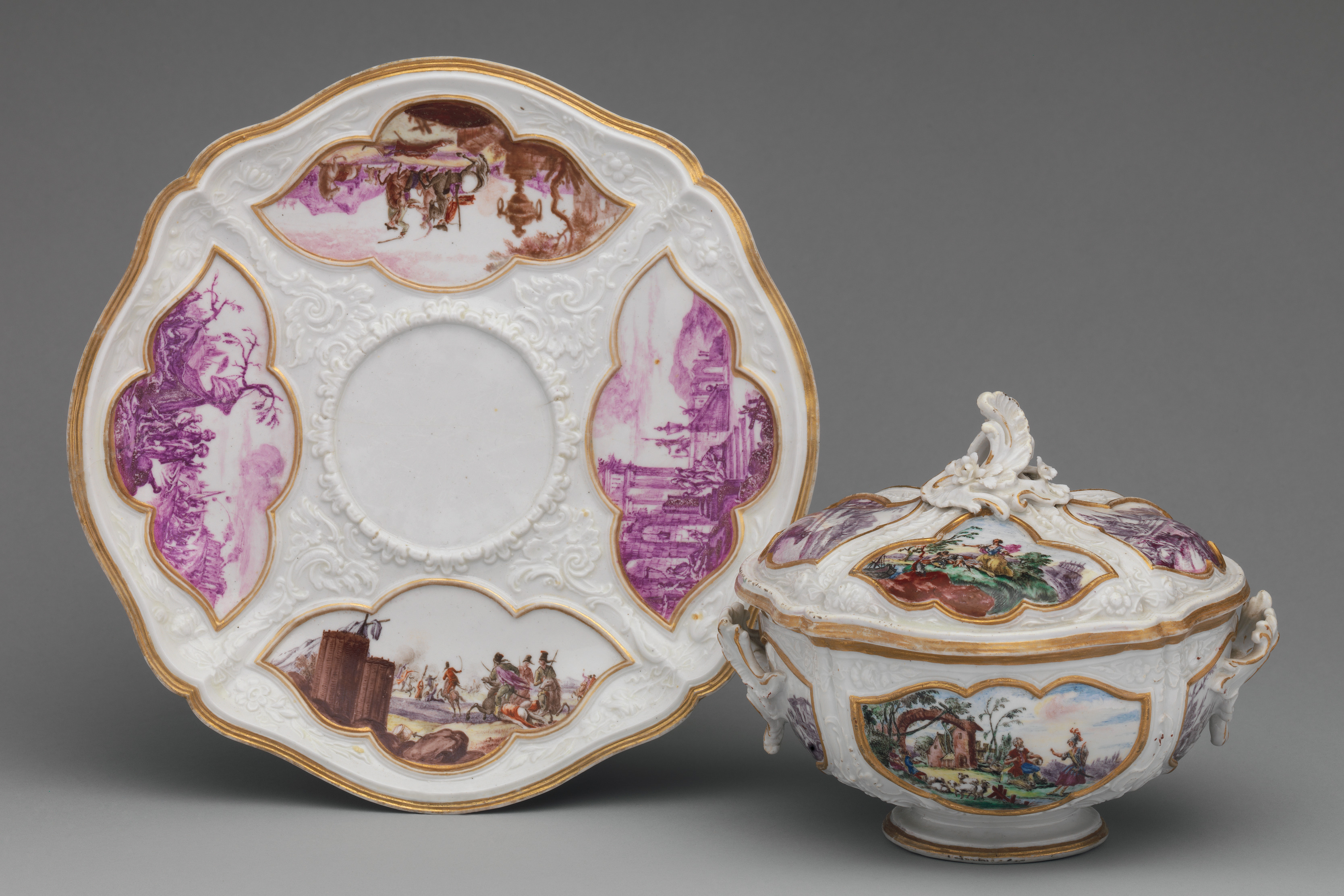
Covered bowl and stand, c. 1765, hard-paste

Bassano was the home of the prolific publishing house of the Remondini family, whose large output included popular prints, wallpaper, book illustrations, and decorative prints. These provided a ready source of images for the porcelain-painters of Le Nove, of whom the head was Giovanni Marcon, brought in by Parolin and still working for Baroni in about 1820.

== History ==
Cups and saucers with insects, after 1775

The factory had been founded in 1728 by Giovanni Battista Antonibon, and taken over by his son Pasquale in 1751. For his production of porcelain he hired Sigusmund Fischer, who had worked at Meissen porcelain. He also sent Lorenzo Levantin, an employee, to work in the French Vincennes porcelain factory to learn their secrets. Porcelain production seems to have started in 1762, but was then paused until 1765 as Antonibon was ill. Some of the employees had by then gone to work for the Cozzi porcelain factory. By 1768 production was on a large scale.

In 1762 Pasquale Antonibon reported to the state that his operation consisted of 136 workers in the factory and 100 "pedlars" selling the wares. He had four large and twelve small kilns, and owned plots where he could extract materials. By 1768 he reported he had 6,000 pieces of porcelain in stock. In 1778 the factory, by then leased out, employed 120 workers making maiolica and 30 porcelain; in 1787, in the Parolin period, there were 37 porcelain-makers.

The first two periods, under the ownership of Pasquale Antonibon and Parolin, are regarded as much the best, although William Chaffers describes some early pieces by the next owner, Giovanni Baroni, as "very charming", and notes the marks of Fabbrica Baroni pieces belonging to William Ewart Gladstone. Production of porcelain continued intermittently until the Antonibon family resumed operations in 1825. They made some porcelain until 1835, thereafter only making earthenwares of various types. In 1784 Pasquale's son Giambologna was old enough to take over the management of the family assets.

== Economics and politics ==
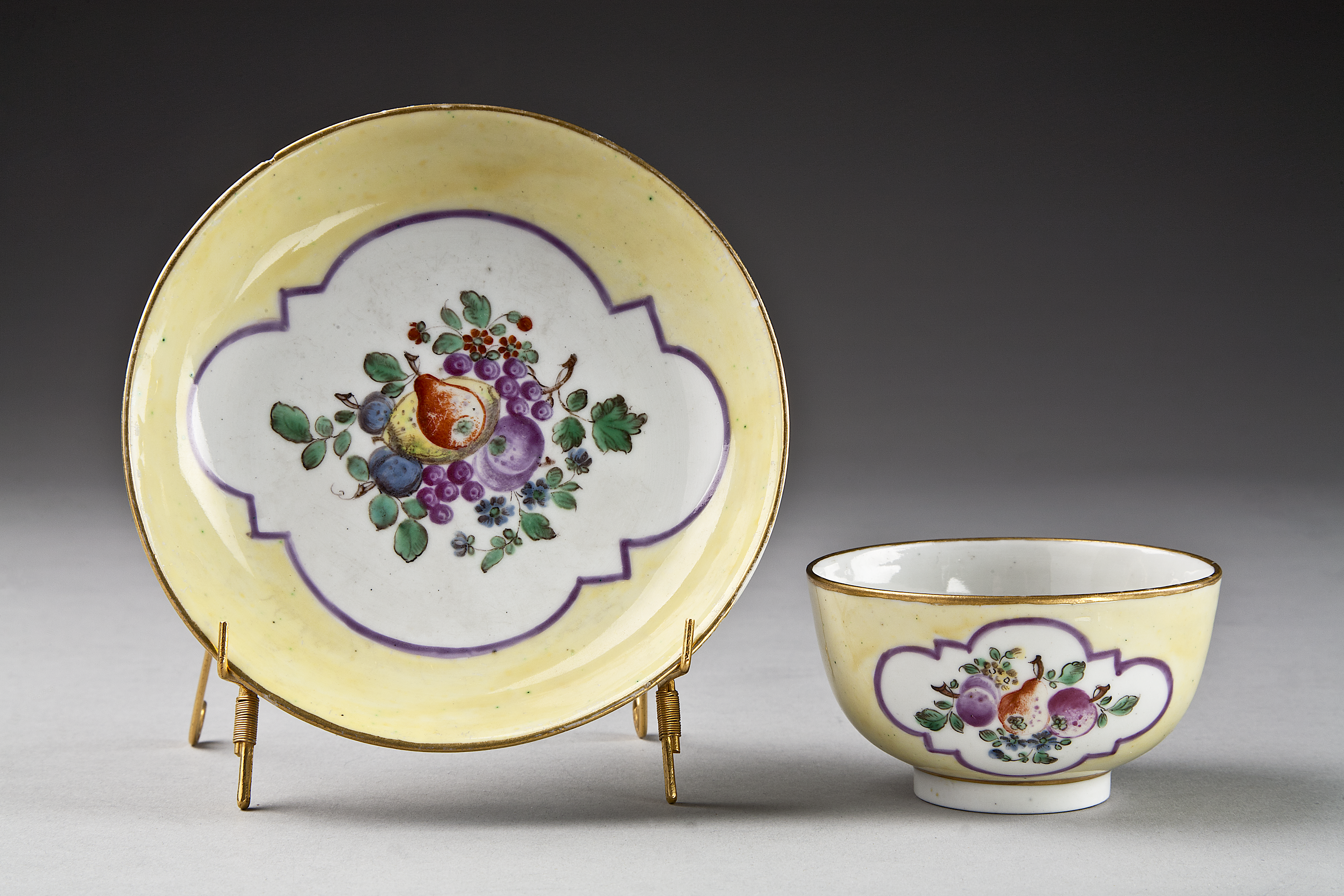
Cup and saucer

Both the Cozzi and Le Nove factories used kaolin from the only known Italian source, Mount Tretto in the Dolomites, now in Schio, controlled by Bortolo Facci. He exploited this position by charging such a high price that Cozzi porcelain was more expensive in Venice than imported pieces. The price rose from 46 lire per carro (load) in 1765 to 100 lire per carro from 1770, then 110 from 1780. By the 1790s the Tretto deposits seemed to be running out. Both Cozzi and Le Nove lobbied the government hard to ameliorate this situation by monopolies and import duties, against each other and foreign manufacturers, but smuggling of foreign porcelain into Venice reduced the effectiveness of these.

The Venetian government archives include extensive collections of petitions, complaints and reports throughout the 18th century documenting these efforts by the Antonibons and other owners, and some allegations of sabotage at the factories, enticing away of workers, and the theft of moulds. According to some scholars, the samples of supposed "Le Nove porcelain" sent by Antonibon to the Venetian government supporting a licence application in 1758 may actually have been made by the long-closed Vezzi porcelain factory in the 1720s, with painted decoration recently added in Nove.

Before they began making porcelain, the Antonibons already enjoyed water rights enabling them to build grinding-mills, a ban (shared by other manufacturers) on their workers joining competitors without a four-year break, and from 1756 a monopoly on the manufacture of maiolica within five miles of Nove, affecting at least one rival in nearby Rivarotta. However, the Antonibons attempts to get a monopoly on the use of moulds were never successful. A local competitor complained of Pasquale Antonibon's "haughty and fierce nature" and the "authority and diligence" he used to get his way. In 1773 the various privileges were renewed, except for the maiolica monopoly, which changing Venetian policy now deprecated. In 1778 new porcelain factories in the republic's territories were banned, to protect the existing three manufacturers, Cozzi, Le Nove and a factory in Este, Veneto. After a further renewal in 1793, all privileges were revoked at the end of 1794 under a new policy.

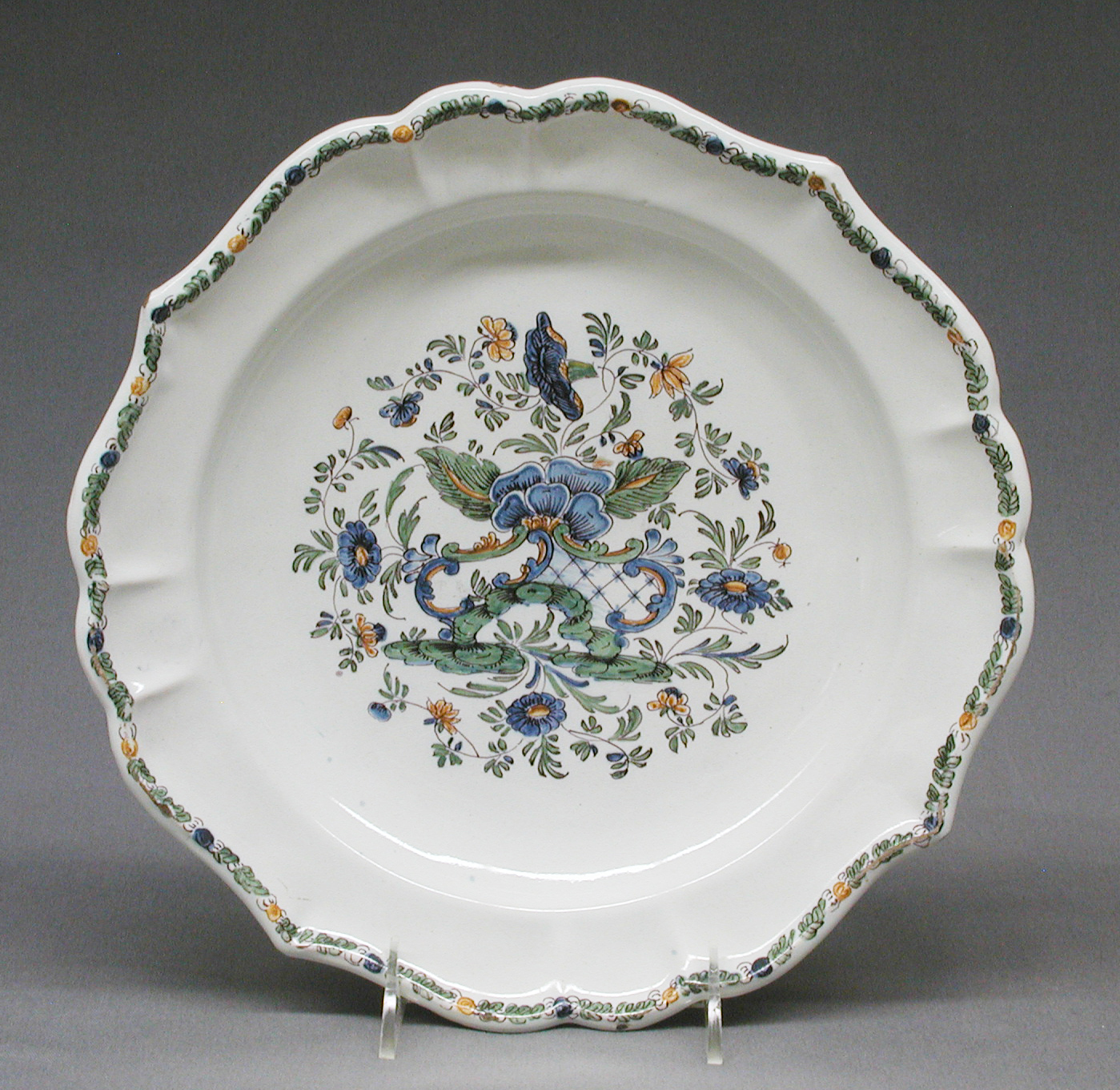
Maiolica plate, c. 1750

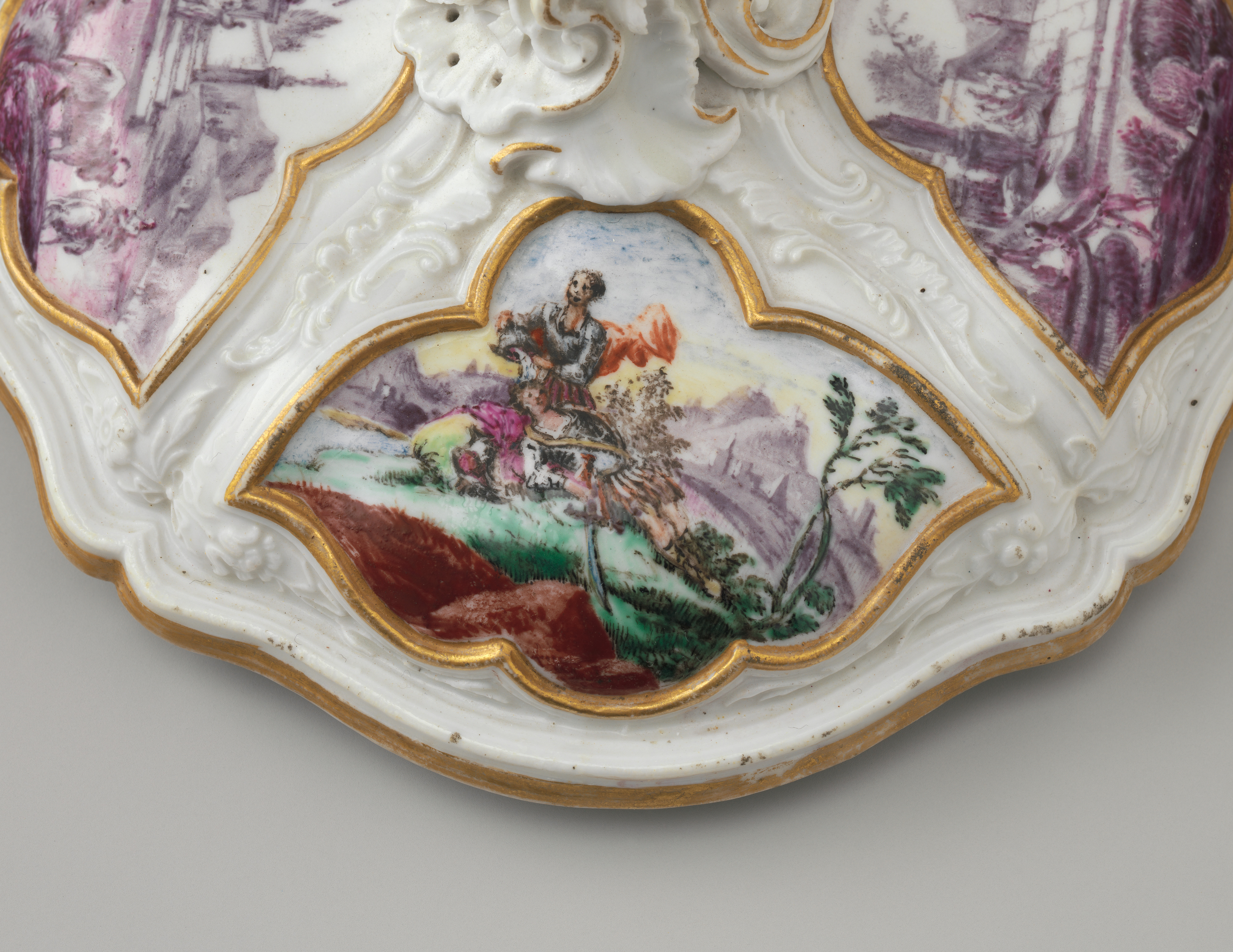
Detail of cover for bowl, c. 1765, hard-paste

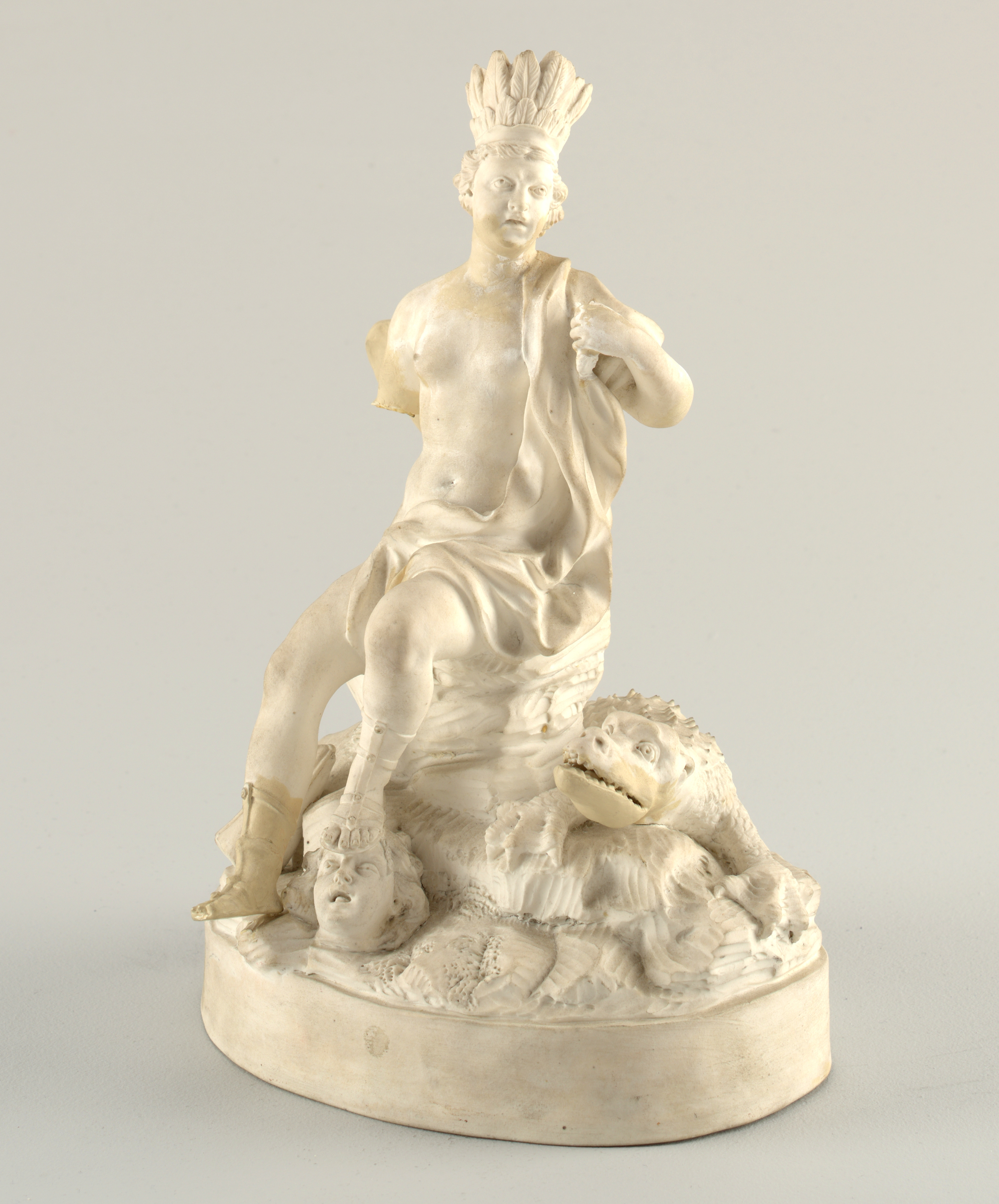
Personification of the Americas (from a set of the continents), unglazed biscuit porcelain

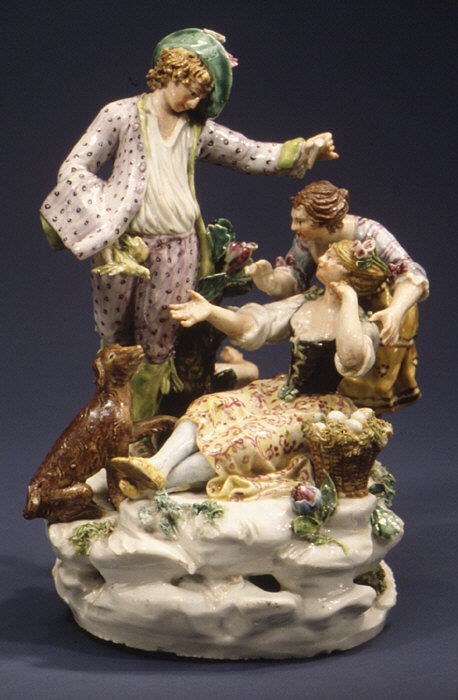
Pastoral Group, Parolin period, hard-paste

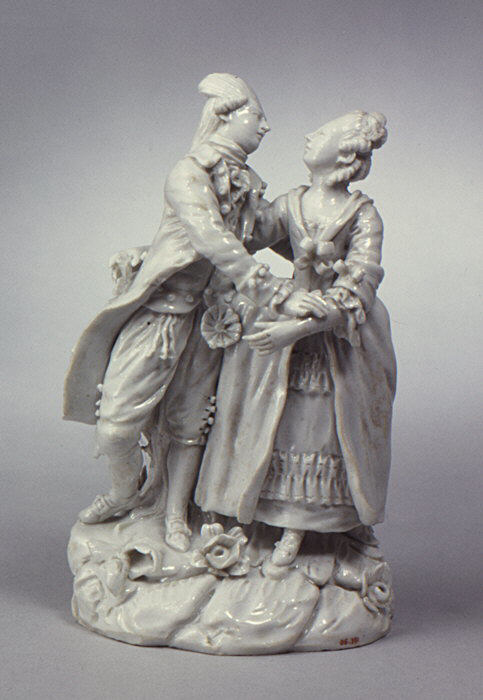
Pair of Lovers, "Parolin period (1781–1802)", hard-paste

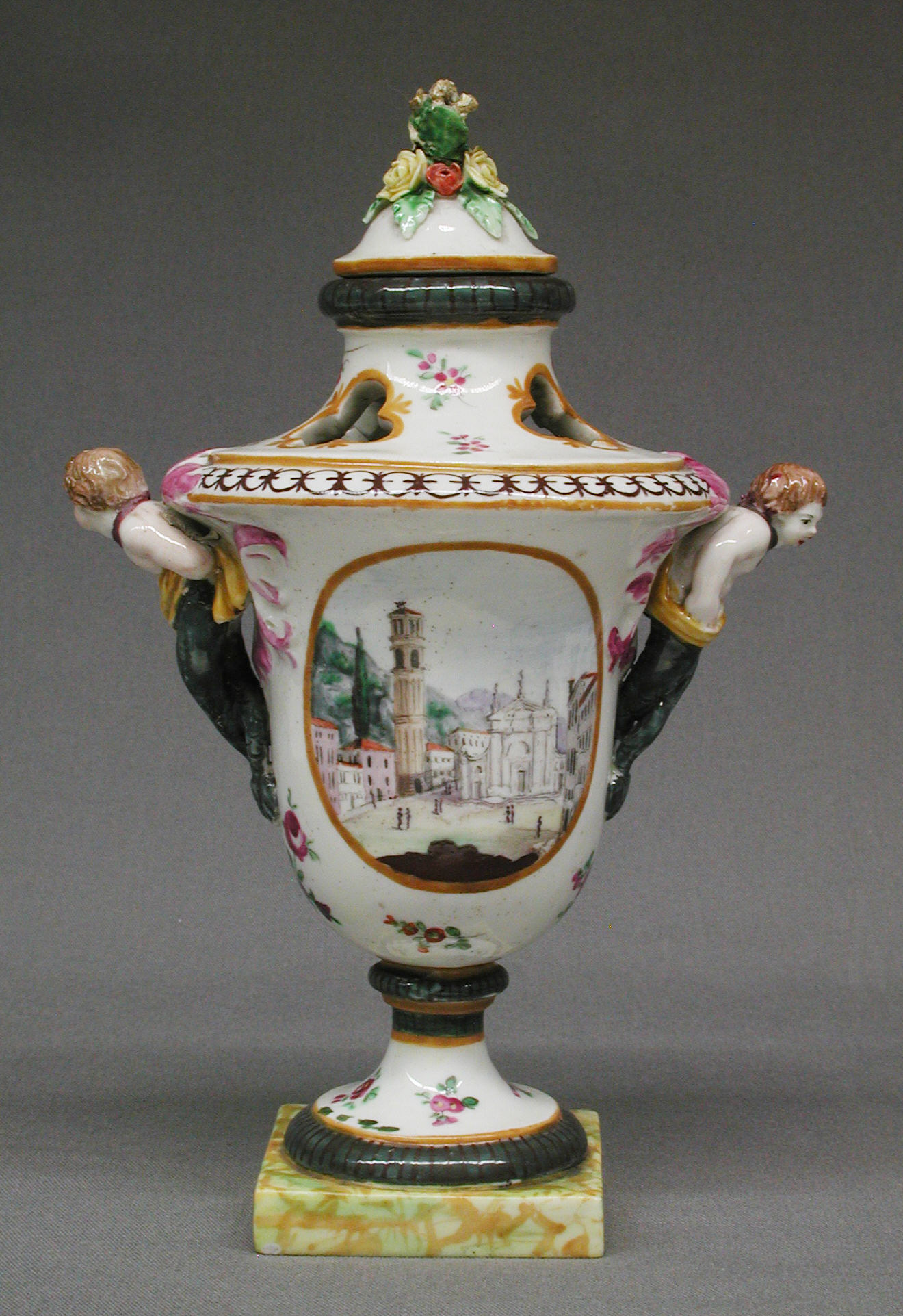
Vase, Parolin period, hard-paste
