= Cozzi porcelain =

Porcelain made by the Cozzi factory in Italy

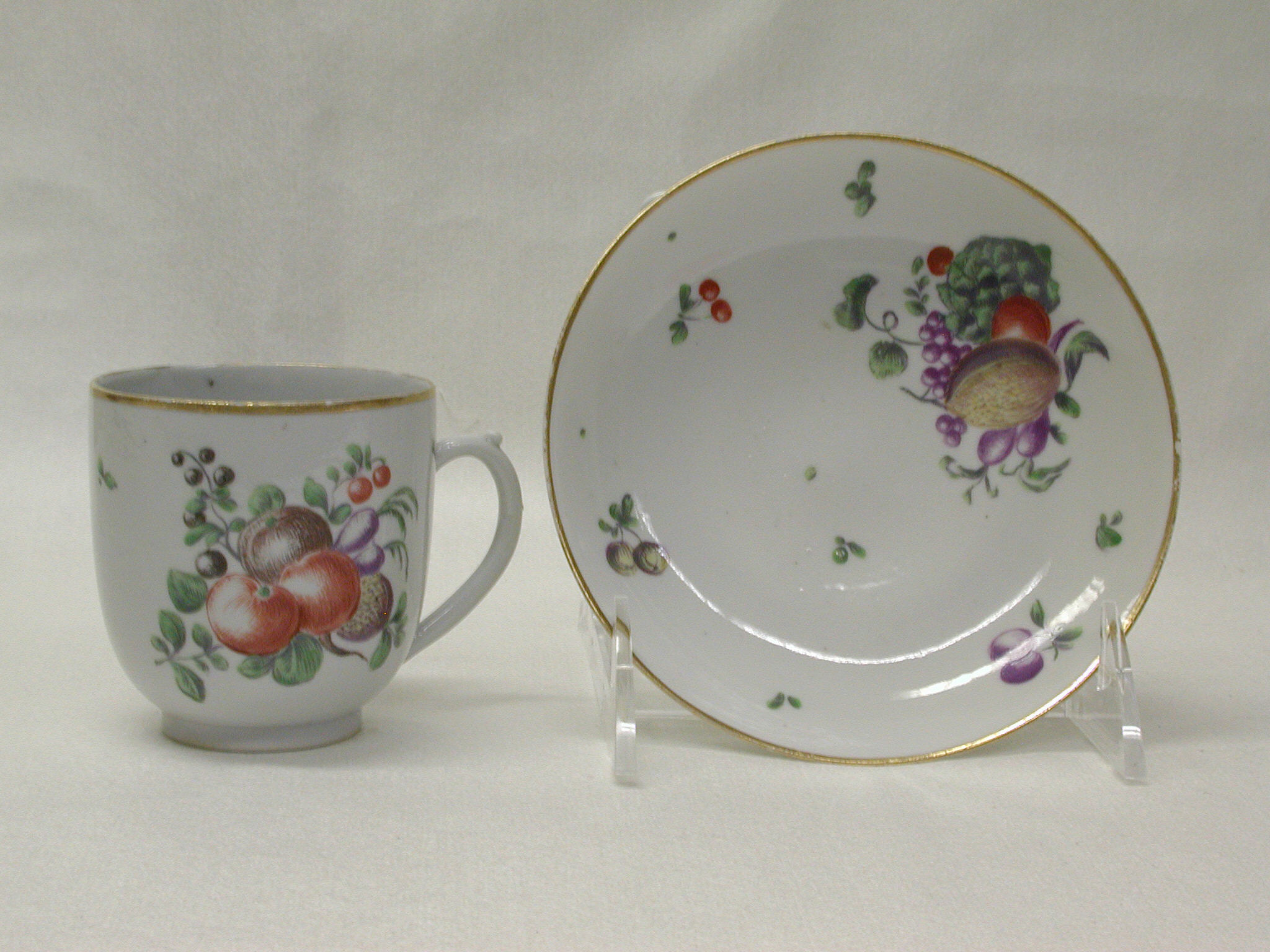
A Cozzi porcelain cup and saucer, Metropolitan Museum of Art

Cozzi porcelain is porcelain made by the Cozzi factory in Venice, which operated between 1764 and 1812. Production included sculptural figurines, mostly left in plain glazed white, and tableware, mostly painted with floral designs or with figures in landscapes and buildings, in "bright but rough" colours. They were rather derivative, drawing from Meissen porcelain in particular in the early years.

The Cozzi factory was the last but most successful of the three factories which made Venetian porcelain actually in the city of Venice in the 18th century. Initially the Cozzi factory made soft-paste porcelain, but by the 1770s they were making hard-paste porcelain, with kaolin from near Vicenza, giving a "thin hard grey paste with a shiny wet-looking surface". Their body is sometimes classified as "hybrid hard-paste porcelain" as although it contains kaolin it was apparently fired at lower temperatures than other hard-pastes.

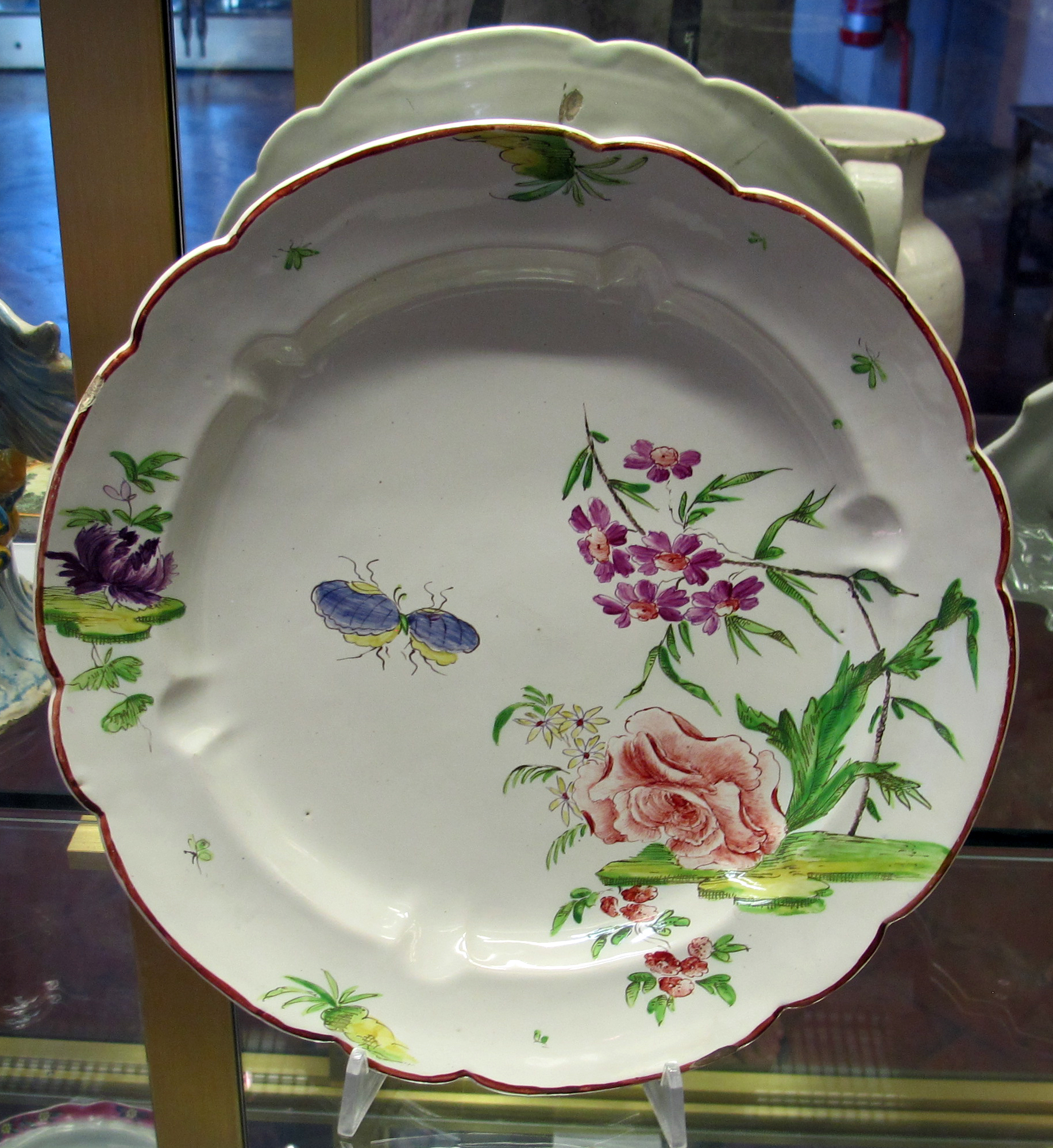
Serving plate, c. 1769–1790

== Venetian porcelain ==
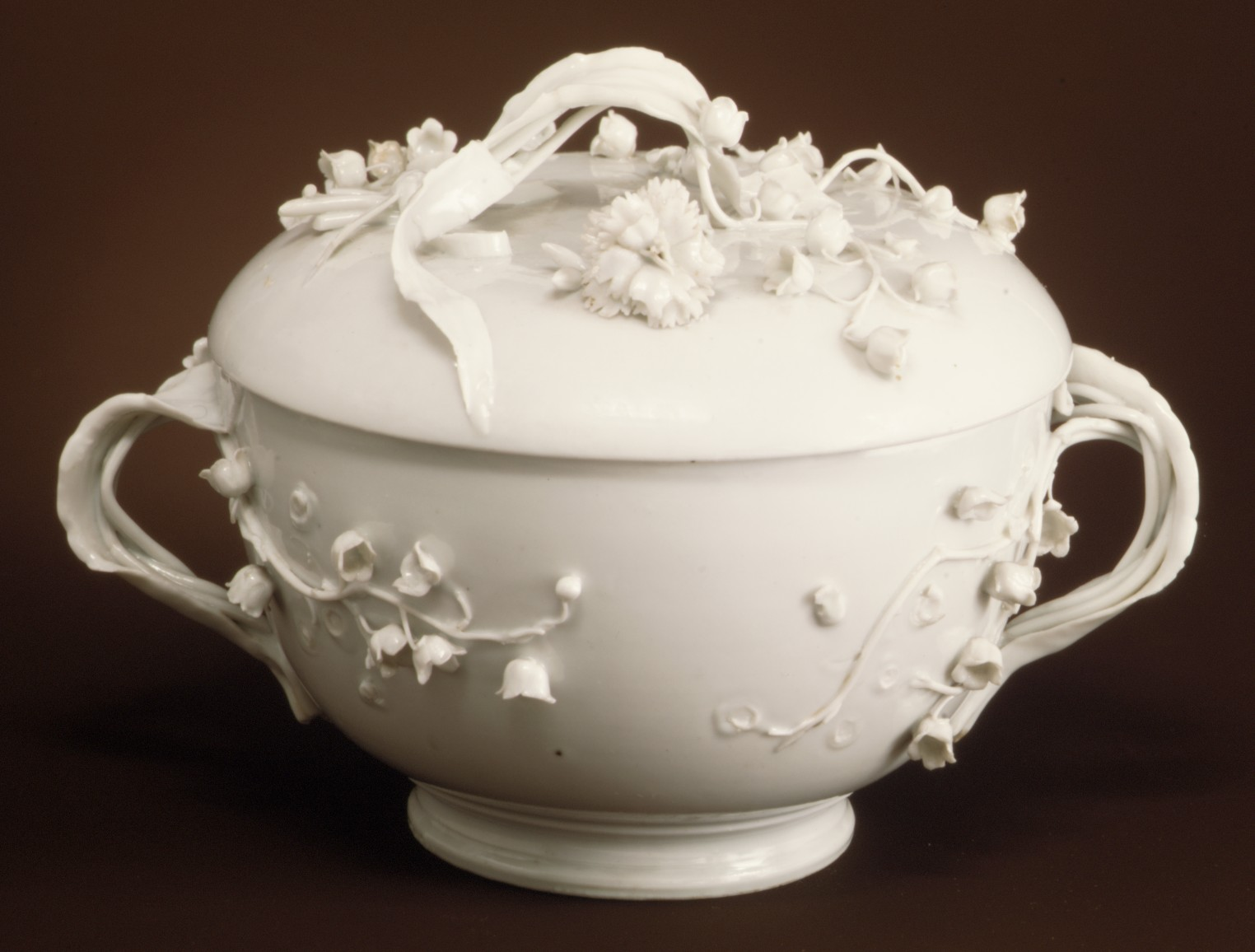
Écuelle (covered bowl), 1770s

The factory was started by Geminiano Cozzi, a banker from Modena, who had been involved with Nathaniel Friedrich Hewelcke, a German porcelain retailer from Dresden (near Meissen), who had moved to Venice. Hewelcke began producing porcelain there in 1758, with Cozzi as a partner in the venture. But by 1763 the factory had closed, with surviving pieces vanishingly rare. The Hewelcke factory made the first porcelain produced in the city since Vezzi porcelain ceased production in 1727. In the meantime, in 1735 Doccia porcelain, near Florence, began production; it became the most important Italian porcelain factory, and continues in the 21st century.

The story of Venetian porcelain is completed with Le Nove porcelain, made (not continuously) between 1762 and 1773, when the founder, Pasquale Antonibon died. The factory, in the pottery centre now called Nove, near Bassano, was already making fine maiolica in fashionable styles, and continued to do so. Porcelain production began again after 1781, when F. Parolin leased the factory for twenty years. The production was similar to that of the Cozzi factory.

== History ==
The Cozzi factory was in the parish of San Giobbe, in the sestiere of Cannaregio. In 1767 it employed 45 people, plus 6 apprentices, had four kilns, and a mill at Treviso for mixing the ingredients. Unlike Vezzi, Cozzi obtained some support from the government of the Republic of Venice, in terms of both legislation and finance. In 1765 he was granted 200 ducats towards the cost of building a water mill to process his materials, and 30 ducats a month for 20 years, as well as legal protection. A pair of fairly large (30 cm (12 in) tall) vases from the factory in the Getty Museum are of a different type from others known, and seem to be an experiment in a new style and body material, perhaps used as gifts to the Republic of Venice in thanks for its support. They are painted in underglaze blue with a scene of Neptune, and an Allegory of Venice.

The 1760s were profitable years for the factory, but a serious fire at the factory in 1771 was a major set-back, requiring the first of a number of re-financings over the next two decades. Both the Cozzi and Le Nove factories used kaolin from the only known Italian source, Mount Tretto in the Dolomites, now in Schio, controlled by a Bortolo Facci. He exploited this position by charging such a high price that Cozzi porcelain was more expensive in Venice than imported pieces. The price rose from 46 lire per carro (load) in 1765 to 100 lire per carro from 1770, then 110 from 1780. By the 1790s the Tretto deposits seemed to be running out.

Both Cozzi and Le Nove lobbied the government hard to ameliorate this situation by monopolies and import duties, against each other and foreign manufacturers, but smuggling of foreign porcelain into Venice reduced the effectiveness of these. It was not surprising that both factories began to make maiolica and then creamware, refined earthenware of the sort pioneered by the Staffordshire factories. By 1784 Cozzi had a stock of 118,000 pieces of porcelain, mostly old and out of fashion.

== Legacy ==
In 2016, the Museo del Settecento veneziano ("Museum of the Venetian Eighteenth Century") at Ca' Rezzonico on the Grand Canal held an exhibition of Cozzi porcelain, showing over 600 pieces from many collections, with a published catalogue.

After an interval of some 250 years, the Cozzi name was revived by a new manufacturer trading as "Geminiano Cozzi Venezia 1765", and making bone china.

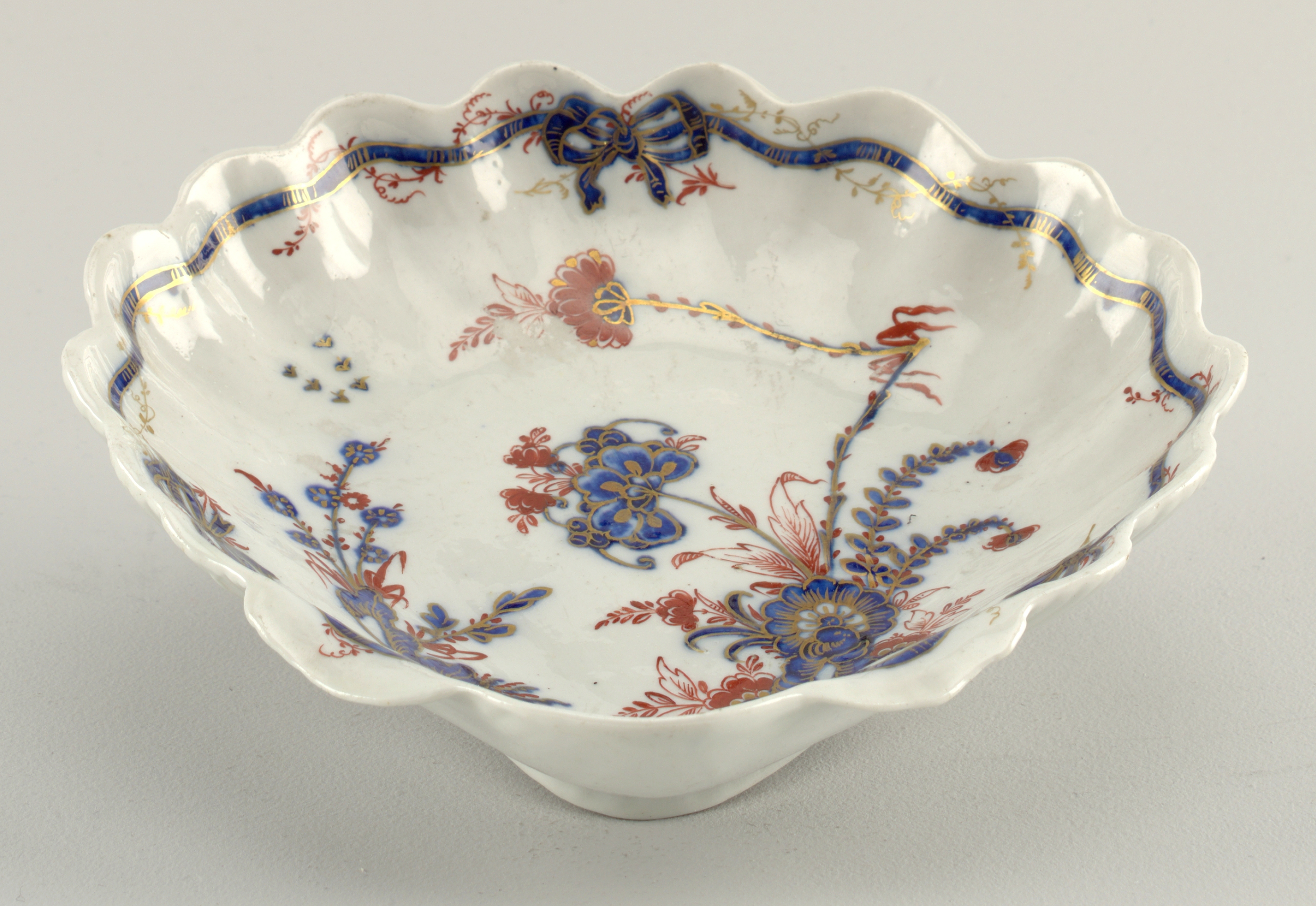
Serving dish

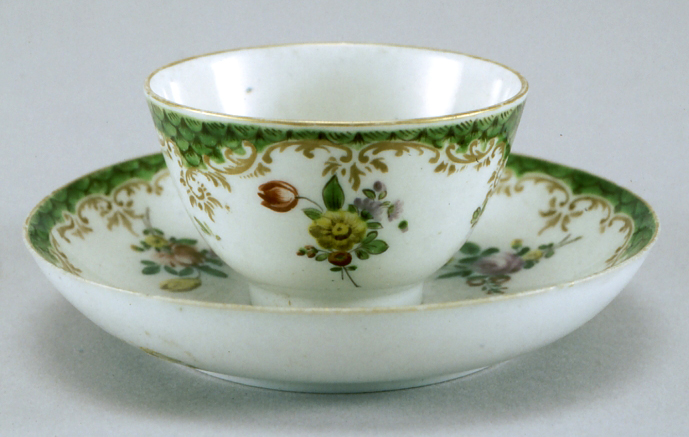
Cup and saucer

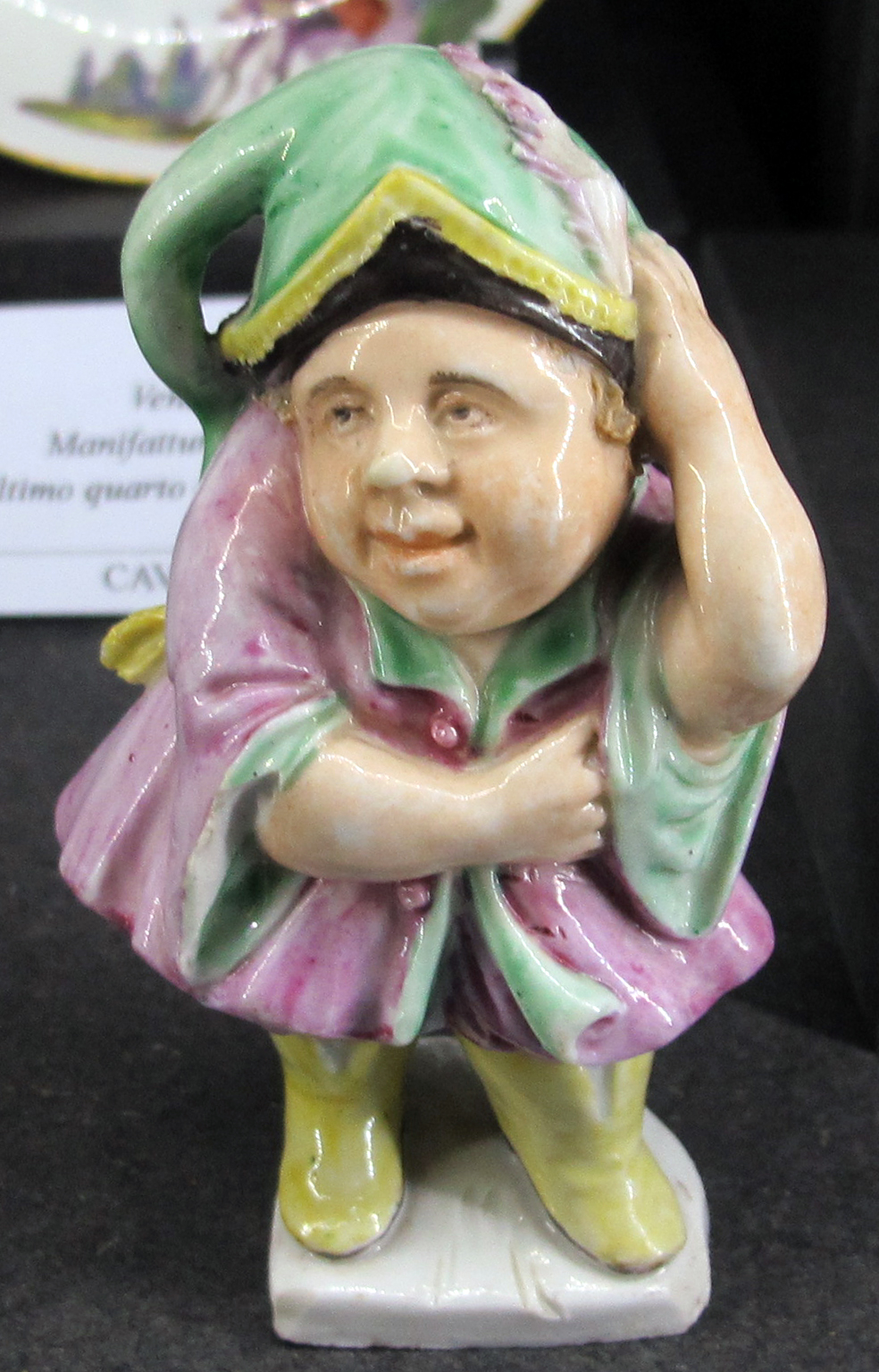
Dwarf, after 1785

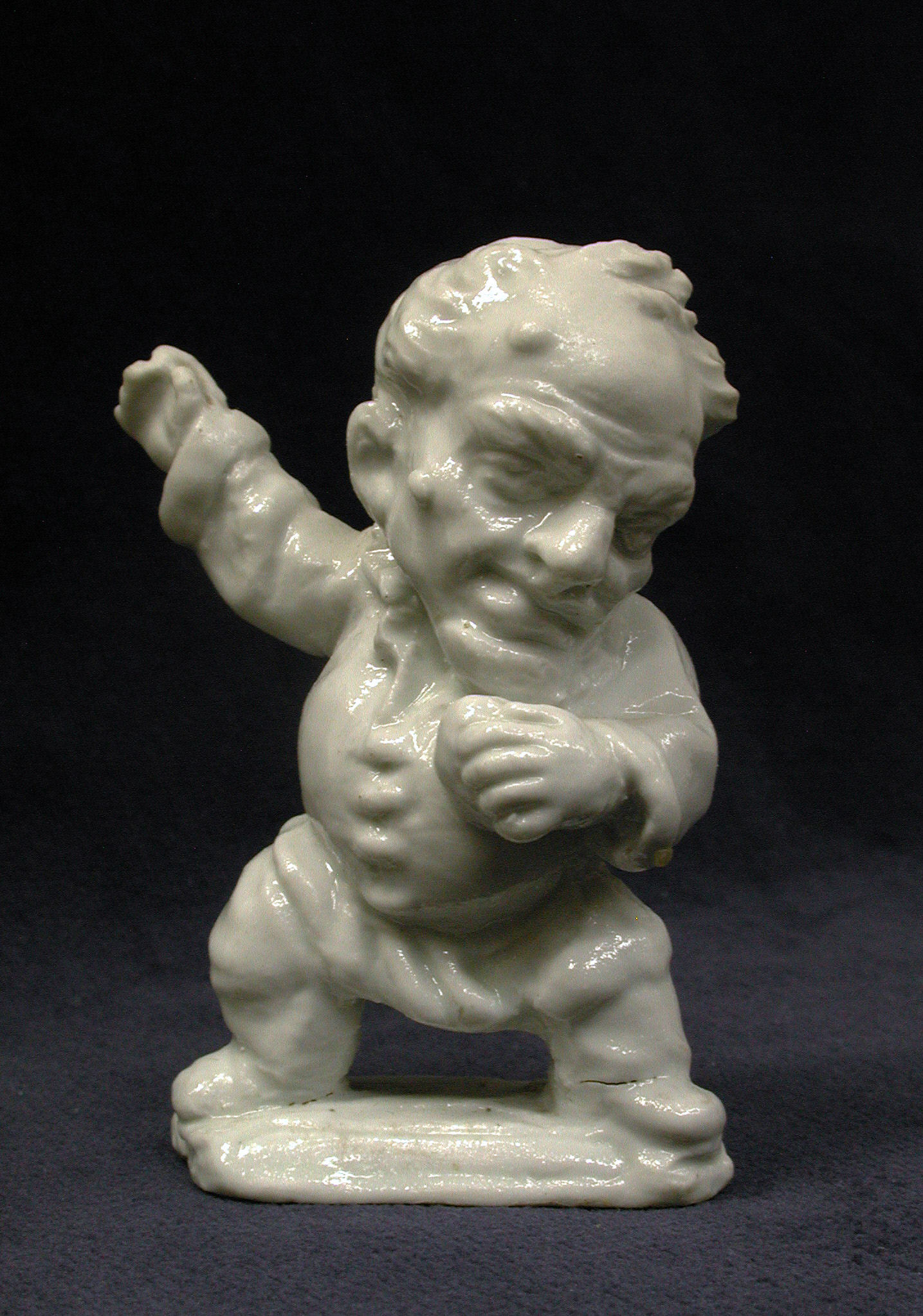
Figure of a dwarf, after Jacques Callot

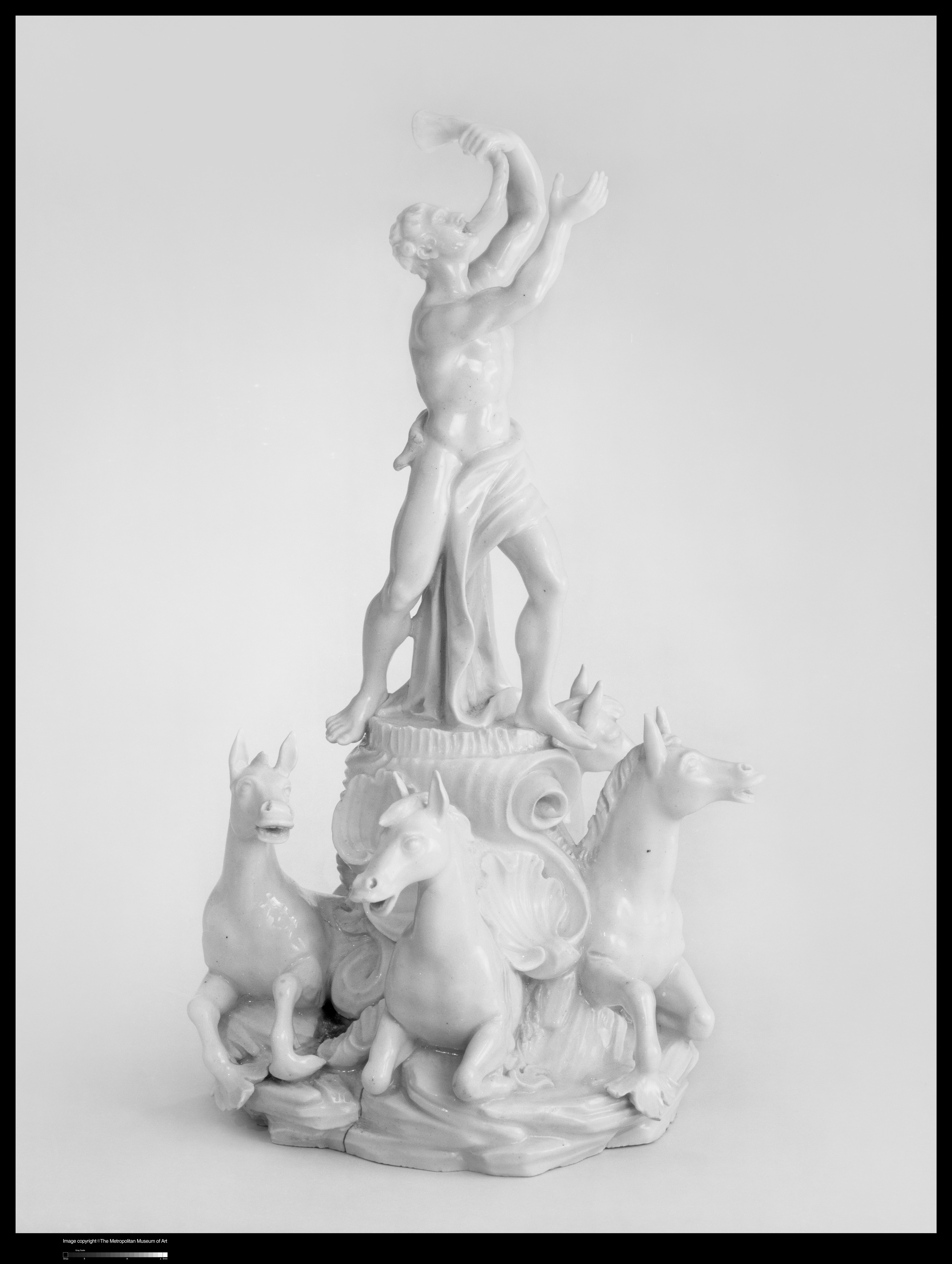
Sculptural centrepiece
