= Decorative arts =

Design and manufacture of functional, beautiful objects

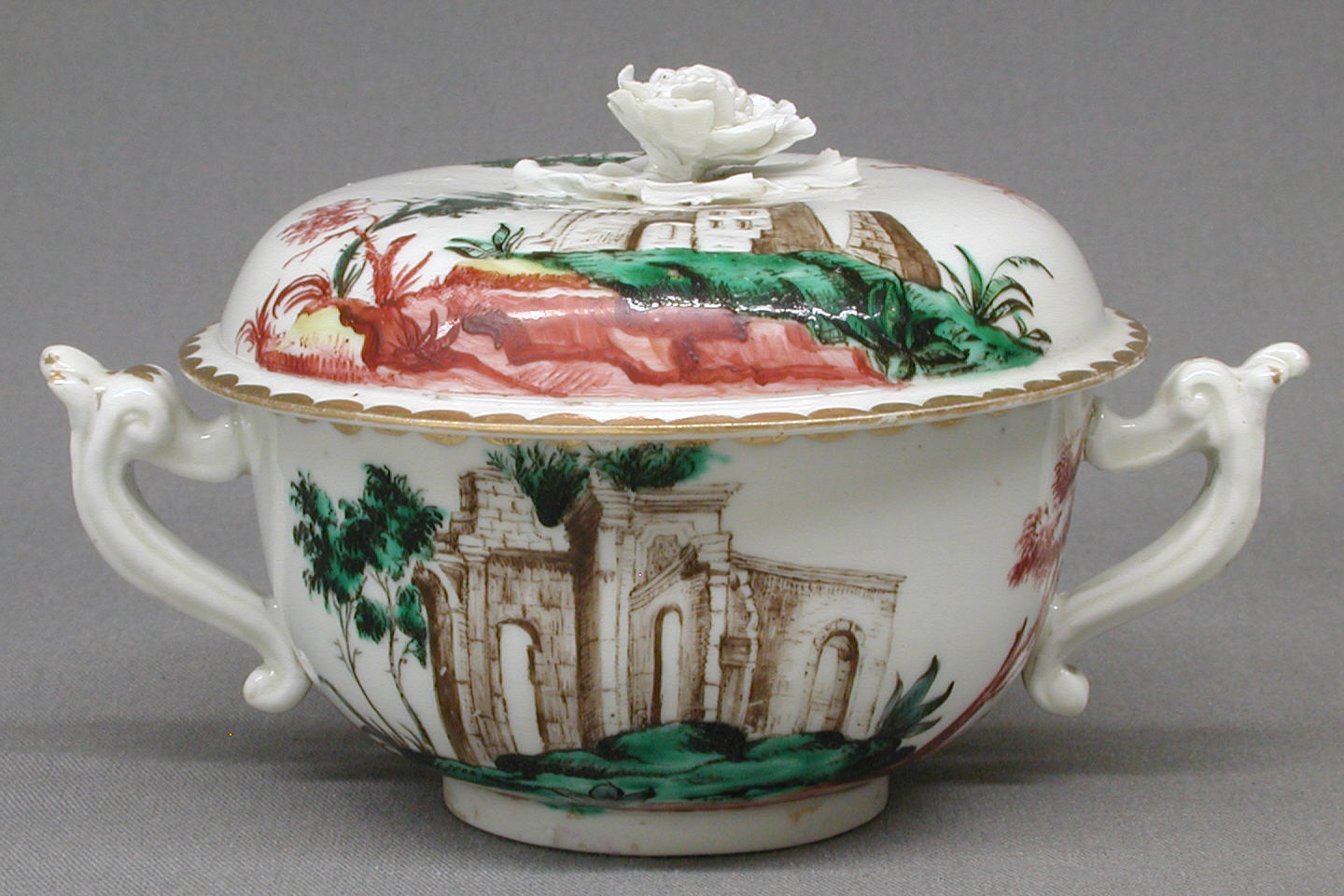
Le Nove porcelain, Bowl with cover, 1765–70, painted with ruins, soft-paste porcelain

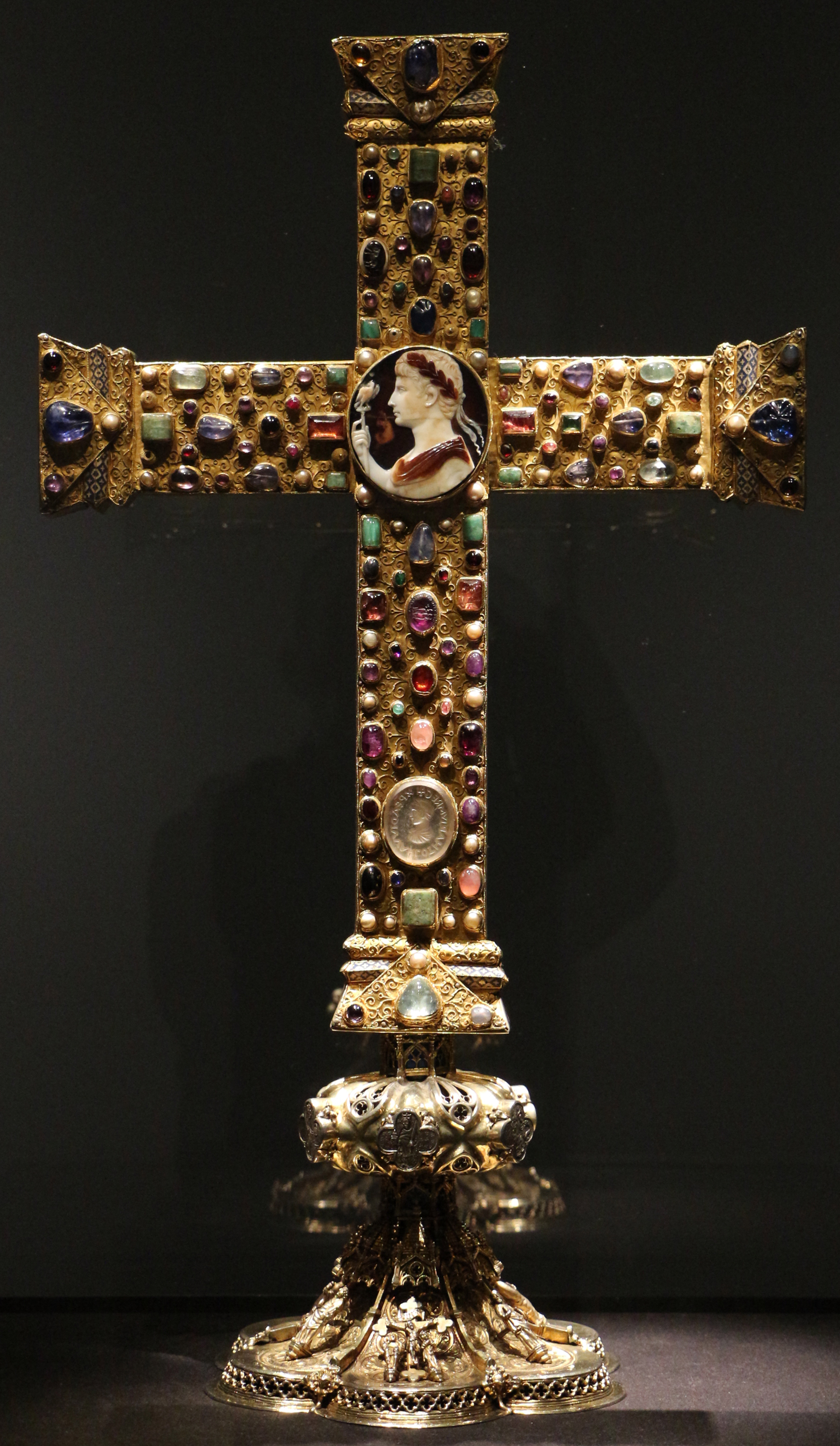
The front side of the Cross of Lothair (c. 1000), a classic example of "Ars Sacra"

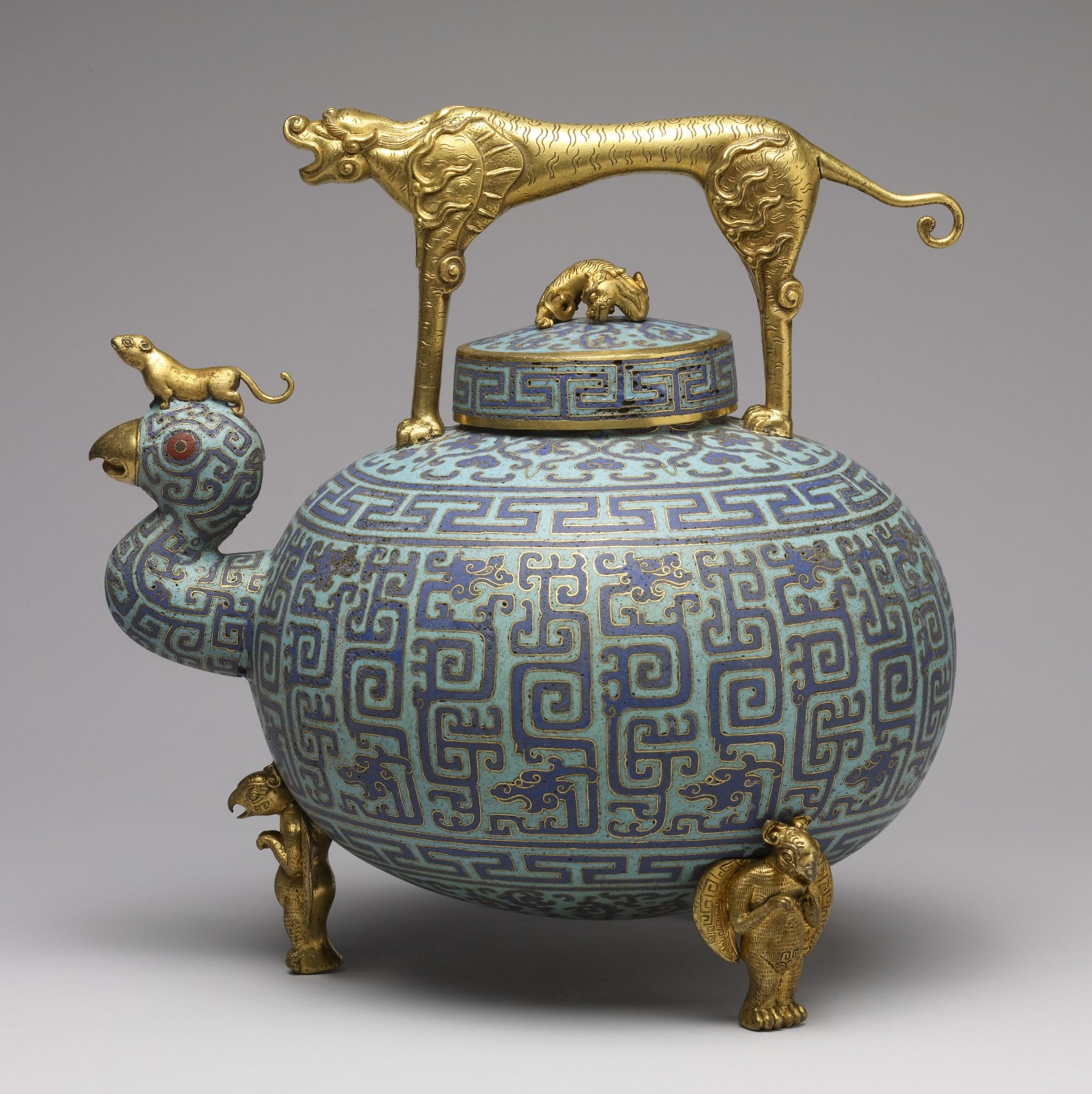
Wine Pot, c. 18th century, China, Walters Art Museum

The decorative arts are arts or crafts whose aim is the design and manufacture of objects that are both beautiful and functional. This includes most of the objects for the interiors of buildings, as well as interior design, but typically excludes architecture. Ceramic art, metalwork, furniture, jewellery, fashion, various forms of the textile arts and glassware are major groupings.

Applied arts largely overlap with the decorative arts, and in modern parlance they are both often placed under the umbrella category of design. The decorative arts are often categorized in distinction to the "fine arts", namely painting, drawing, photography, and large-scale sculpture, which generally produce objects solely for their aesthetic quality and capacity to stimulate the intellect.

== Distinction from the fine arts ==
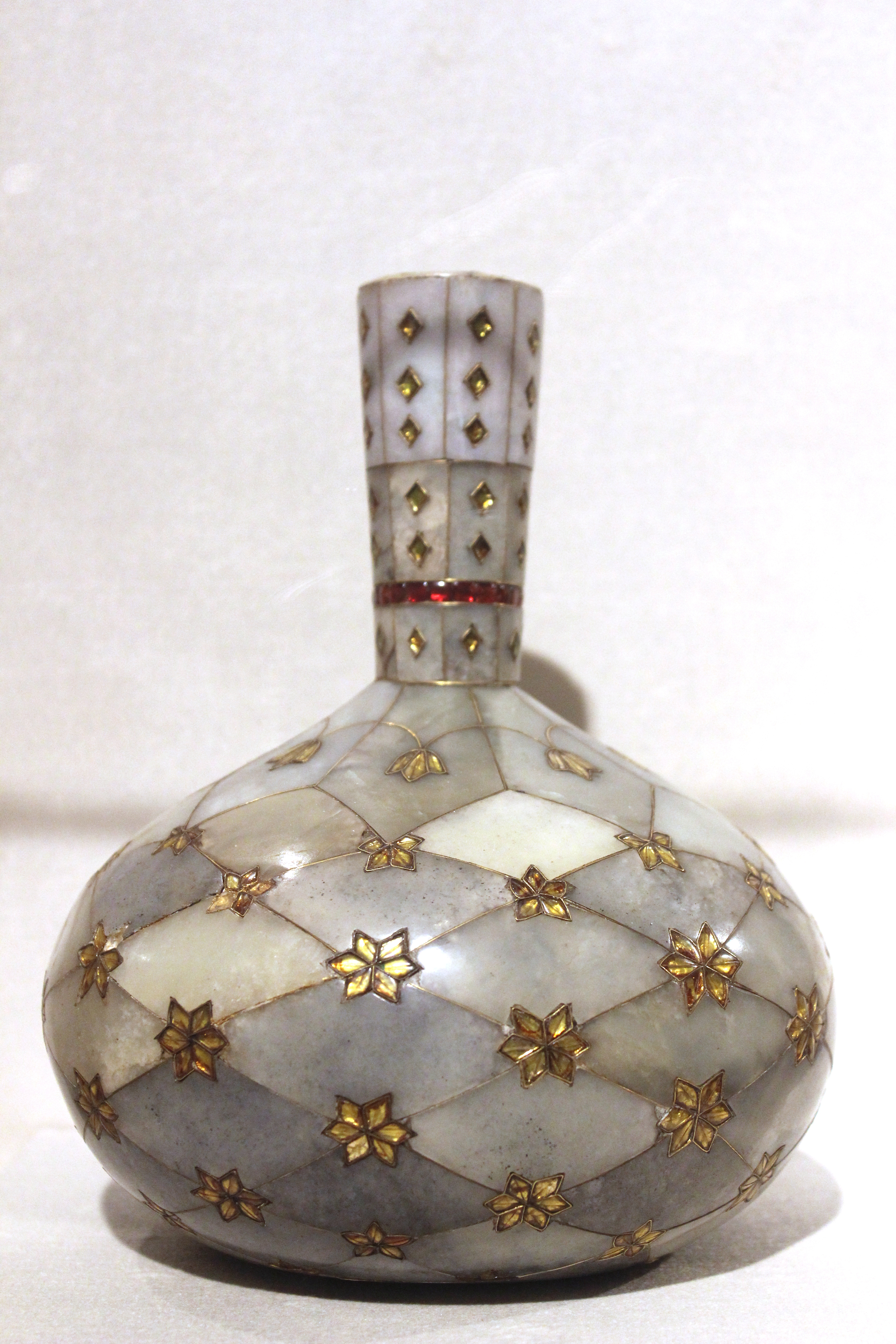
Surahi, Mughal, 17th century CE. National Museum, New Delhi

The distinction between the decorative and fine arts essentially arose from the post-renaissance art of the West, where the distinction is for the most part meaningful. This distinction is much less meaningful when considering the art of other cultures and periods, where the most valued works, or even all works, include those in decorative media. For example, Islamic art in many periods and places consists entirely of the decorative arts, often using geometric and plant forms, as does the art of many traditional cultures.

The distinction between decorative and fine arts is not very useful for appreciating Chinese art, and neither is it for understanding early Medieval art in Europe. During that period in Europe, fine arts such as manuscript illumination and monumental sculpture existed, but the most prestigious works tended to be in goldsmith work, in cast metals such as bronze, or in other techniques such as ivory carving. Large-scale wall-paintings were much less regarded, crudely executed, and rarely mentioned in contemporary sources. They were probably seen as an inferior substitute for mosaic, which for the period must be considered a fine art, though in recent centuries mosaics have tended to be considered decorative. A similar fate has befallen tapestry, which late medieval and Renaissance royalty regarded as the most magnificent artform, and was certainly the most expensive. The term "ars sacra" ("sacred arts") is sometimes used for medieval christian art executed in metal, ivory, textiles, and other more valuable materials but not for rare secular works from that period.

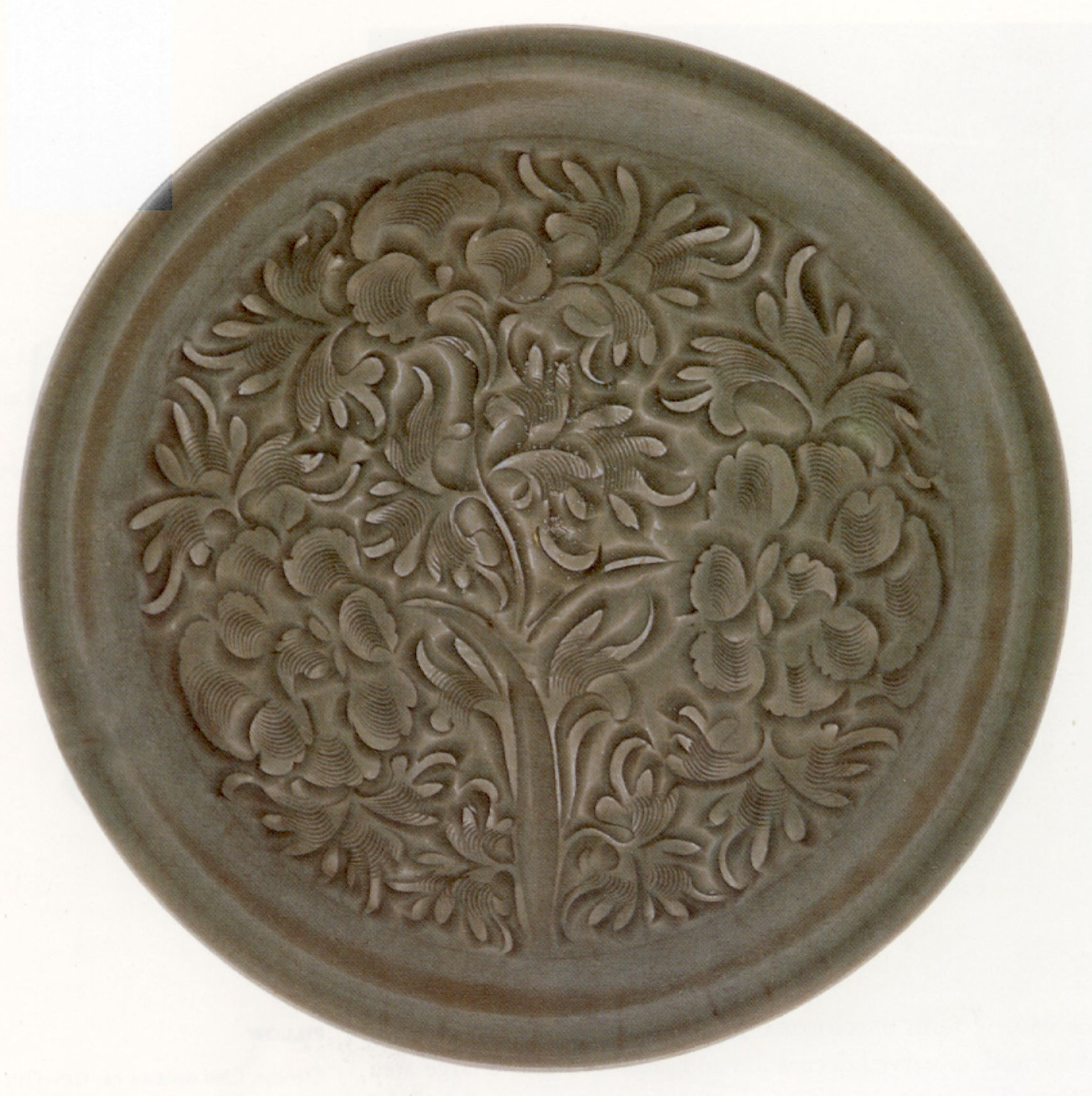
Chinese bowl, Northern Song Dynasty, 11th or 12th century, porcelaneous pottery with celadon glaze

The view of decoration as a 'lesser art' was formally challenged in the 1970s by writers and art historians like Amy Goldin and Anne Swartz. The argument for a singular narrative in art had lost traction by the close of the 20th century through post-modernist irony and increasing curatorial interest in street art and in ethnic decorative traditions. The Pattern and Decoration movement in New York galleries in the 1980s, though short-lived, opened the way to a more inclusive evaluation of the value of art objects.

== Influence of different materials ==
Modern understanding of the art of many cultures tends to be distorted by the modern privileging of fine visual arts media over others, as well as the very different survival rates of works in different media. Works in metal, above all in precious metals, are liable to be "recycled" as soon as they fall from fashion, and were often used by owners as repositories of wealth, to be melted down when extra money was needed. Illuminated manuscripts have a much higher survival rate, especially in the hands of the church, as there was little value in the materials and they were easy to store.

== Renaissance attitudes ==
The promotion of the fine arts over the decorative in European thought can largely be traced to the Renaissance, when Italian theorists such as Vasari promoted artistic values, exemplified by the artists of the High Renaissance, that placed little value on the cost of materials or the amount of skilled work required to produce a work, but instead valued artistic imagination and the individual touch of the hand of a supremely gifted master such as Michelangelo, Raphael or Leonardo da Vinci, reviving to some extent the approach of antiquity. Most European art during the Middle Ages had been produced under a very different set of values, where both expensive materials and virtuoso displays in difficult techniques had been highly valued.

In China both approaches had co-existed for many centuries: ink wash painting, mostly of landscapes, was to a large extent produced by and for the scholar-bureaucrats or "literati", and was intended as an expression of the artist's imagination above all, while other major fields of art, including the very important Chinese ceramics produced in effectively industrial conditions, were produced according to a completely different set of artistic values.

== Arts and Crafts movement ==
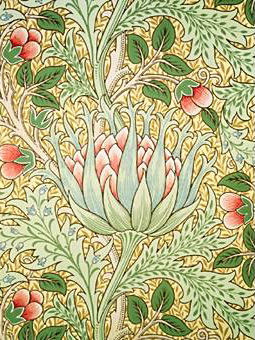
Arts and Crafts movement "Artichoke" wallpaper by Morris and Co.

The lower status given to works of decorative art in contrast to fine art narrowed with the rise of the Arts and Crafts movement. This aesthetic movement of the second half of the 19th century was born in England and inspired by the writings of Thomas Carlyle, John Ruskin and William Morris. The movement represented the beginning of a greater appreciation of the decorative arts throughout Europe. The appeal of the Arts and Crafts movement to a new generation led the English architect and designer Arthur Heygate Mackmurdo to organize the Century Guild for craftsmen in 1882, championing the idea that there was no meaningful difference between the fine and decorative arts. Many converts, both from professional artists' ranks and from among the intellectual class as a whole, helped spread the ideas of the movement.

The influence of the Arts and Crafts movement led to the decorative arts being given a greater appreciation and status in society and this was soon reflected by changes in the law. Until the enactment of the Copyright Act 1911 only works of fine art had been protected from unauthorized copying. The 1911 Act extended the definition of an "artistic work" to include works of "artistic craftsmanship".

== Mass production and customization ==
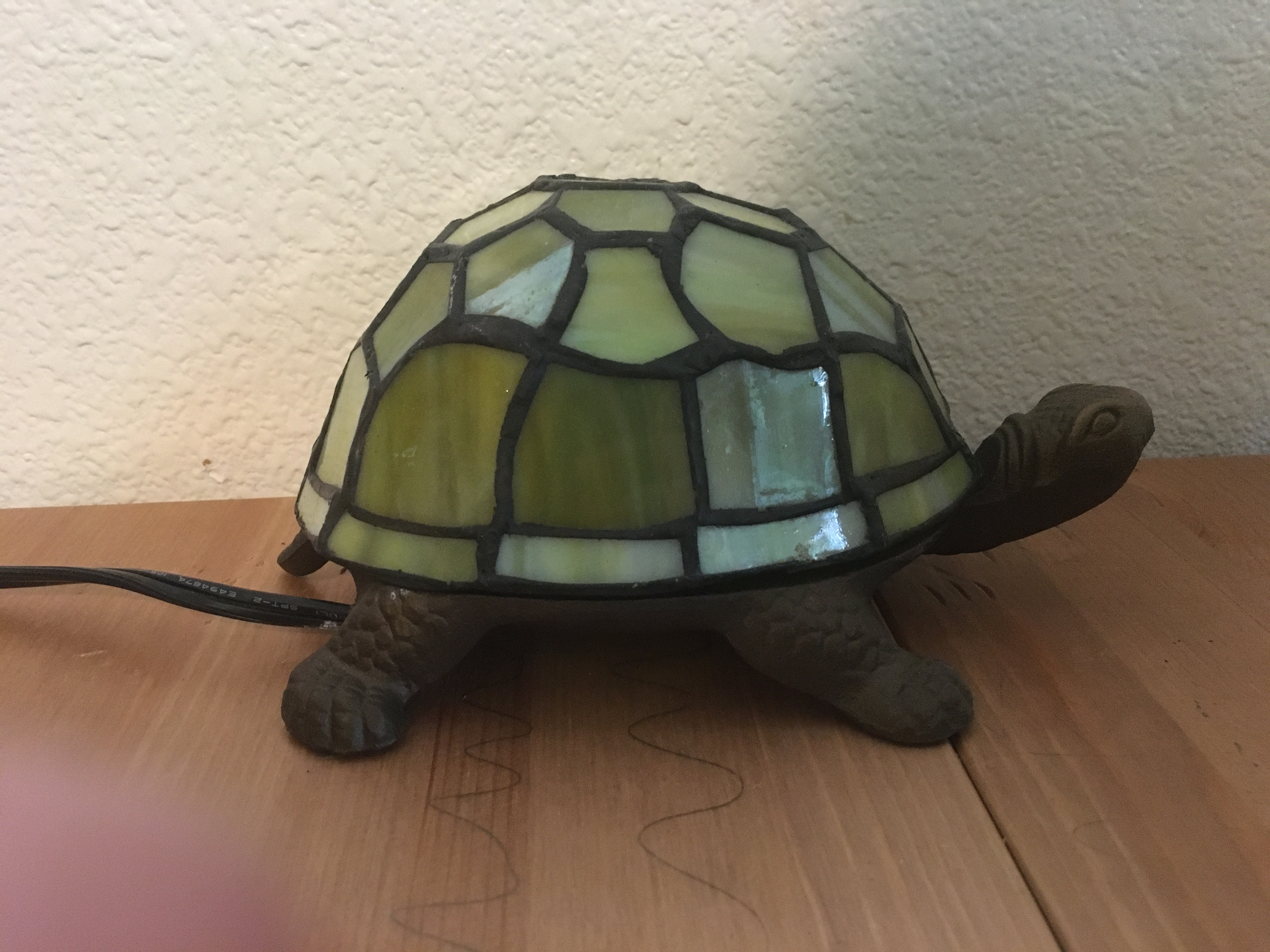
Electric lamp in the shape of a turtle

In the context of mass production and consumerism some individuals will attempt to create or maintain their lifestyle or to construct their identity when forced to accept mass-produced identical objects in their life. According to Colin Campbell in his piece "The Craft Consumer", this is done by selecting goods with specific intentions in mind to alter them. Instead of accepting a foreign object for what it is, the foreign object is incorporated and changed to fit one's lifestyle and choices, or customized.

One way to achieve a customized look and feel to common objects is to change their external appearance by applying decorative techniques, as in decoupage, art cars, truck art in South Asia and IKEA hacking.

== See also ==
- American craft
- Art Nouveau in Milan
- Art for art's sake
- Arts and Crafts movement
- Applied arts
- Design museum
- Faux painting
- Fine arts
- Industrial design
- Loewe Foundation Craft Prize
- Ornament (architecture)

== References and sources ==
Sources

- Fiell, Charlotte and Peter, eds. Decorative Art Yearbook (one for each decade of the 20th century). Translated. Bonn: Taschen, 2000.
- Fleming, John and Hugh Honour. Dictionary of the Decorative Arts. New York: Harper and Row, 1977.
- Frank, Isabelle. The Theory of Decorative Art: An Anthology of European and American Writings, 1750–1940. New Haven: Yale University Press, 2000.
- Campbell, Gordon. The Grove Encyclopedia of Decorative Arts. New York: Oxford University Press, 2006.
- Thornton, Peter. Authentic Decor: Domestic Interior, 1620–1920. London: Seven Dials, 2000.
