= Portrait of Marsilio Cassotti and His Bride Faustina =

1523 oil painting by Lorenzo Lotto

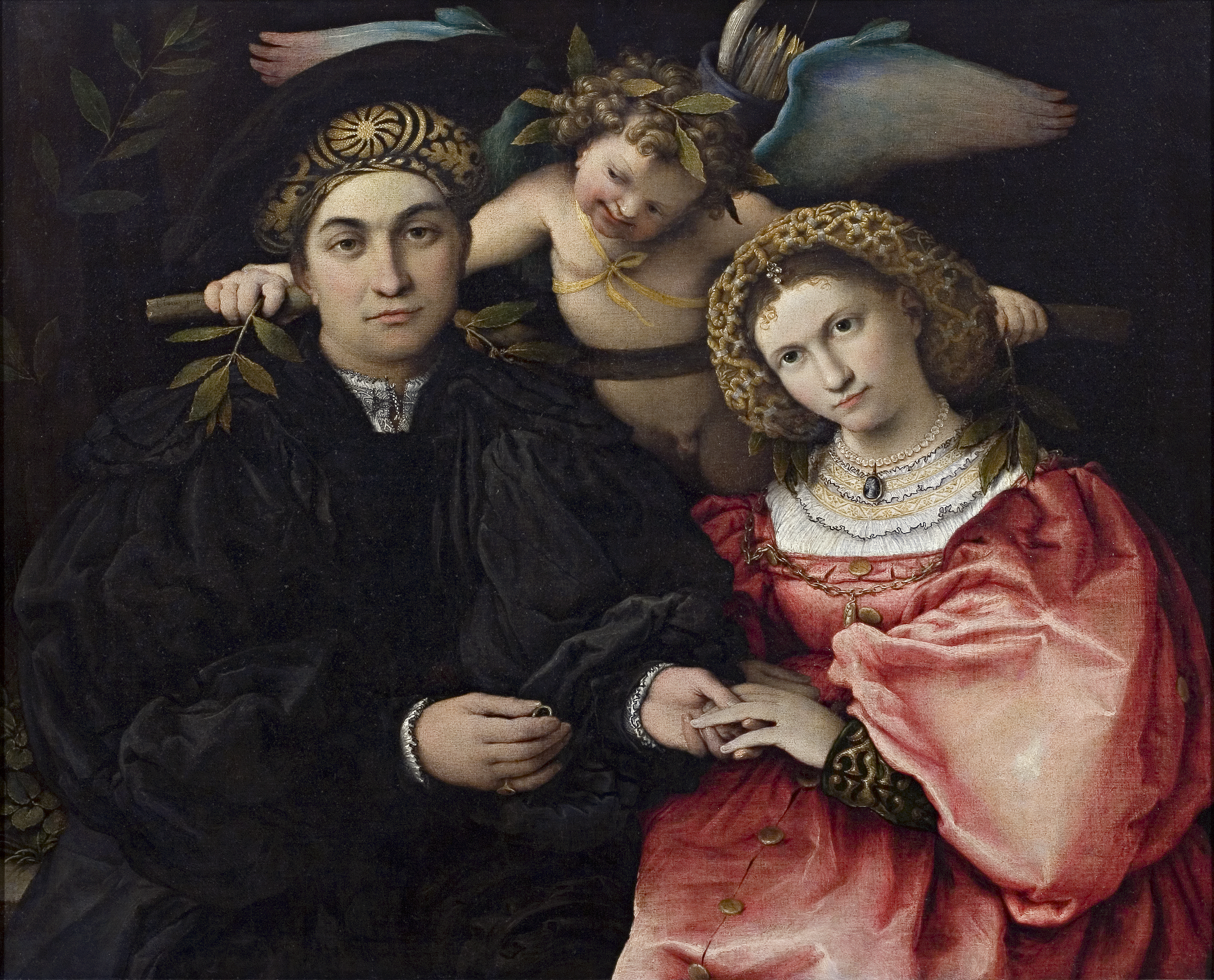
- Artist: Lorenzo Lotto
- Year: 1523
- Medium: Oil on panel
- Dimensions: 71 cm × 84 cm (28 in × 33 in)
- Location: Museo del Prado, Madrid

Portrait of Marsilio Cassotti and His Bride Faustina is an oil-on-panel painting by Italian Renaissance painter Lorenzo Lotto. The painting was created in 1523, after Lotto had settled down in Bergamo, and is currently housed in the Museo del Prado in Madrid. The work is signed and dated "Lotus Pictor 1523". It is the first known marriage portrait produced in Italy, preceded by earlier such portraits from Germany and the Netherlands, such as the Arnolfini Portrait.

== Description ==
The painting depicts the bridal couple at the moment of marriage, with the groom placing a ring on the bride's third finger. Behind the couple is Cupid, smiling while placing a yoke on their shoulders.

=== Symbolism ===
The placing of the ring on the third finger likely references a theory dating back to Saint Isidore of Seville that the vein which fed the finger led directly back to the heart. The bride wears a pearl necklace, which, at the time, was a symbol of her submission to her husband. This is further reinforced by the composition, which places her bowed to and lower than the groom. The bride also wears around her neck a cameo of Faustina the Elder, who was seen by some renaissance painters as a "model wife". Finally, the yoke placed by Cupid depicts the couple's new marriage to one another as a burden being set on their shoulders.

=== Critical analysis ===
American art historian Bernard Berenson, in his essay on Lotto's work published in 1895, describes the painting as "the first positively humorous interpretation of characters and of a situation that we have in Italian painting". Berenson interprets the painting as humorously ironic, noting the expressions of the characters, especially Cupid's "rogueish, amused look" as he binds together with a yoke the solemn couple at their moment of marriage.

== History ==
The painting was commissioned by Zanin Cassotti, Marsilio's father, for the couple's wedding. Although initially priced at 30 denari by Lotto, Zanin Cassotti ultimately purchased the piece for 20 denari. It stayed within the Cassotti family until it was taken to Spain, likely in the 17th century, and was documented in the Alcázar artwork catalogue in 1666. It was moved to its current location in the Prado Museum during the 19th century.
