= Lombardo-Venetian lira =

Currency of the Kingdom of Lombardy–Venetia

lira austriaca (Italian)

Unit
- Symbol: £

Denominations
- Subunit
- 1/100: centesimo
- Coins: c.1, c.3, c.5, c.10, c.15 £1/4, £1/2, £1, ₤3, £6
- Rarely used: £20, £40

Demographics
- Replaced by: Lombardo-Venetian florin
- Official user(s): (Austria) Lombardy–Venetia
- Unofficial user: (Austrian Empire) Austria (silver coins)

Issuance
- Mint: Milan Mint, Venice Mint, Vienna Mint

Valuation
- Pegged by: 1/3 of Austrian florin
- This infobox shows the latest status before this currency was rendered obsolete.

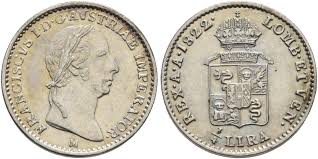
1/4 Lira From 1822 From the kingdom of Lombardy-Venetia

The lira austriaca (or lira; plural: lire) was the currency of the Kingdom of Lombardy–Venetia.

== History ==
The lira was made of 4.33 grams of silver (with 9/10 of purity). Six lire were equal to the scudo which was equivalent to the Austrian Conventionsthaler, hence they had no relation to the former currencies the Venetian lira and the Milanese scudo. The lira was divided into 100 centesimi (cents). Coins were minted in Milan, Venice and Vienna.

Due to the heavy consequences of the war, Austria was not able to immediately produce the new currency when it took possession of the territory in 1814. Hence the Napoleonic Italian lira continued to be a legal tender for eight years after the fall of its inventor. The first issue of the Austrian currency was possible only in 1822. The new lire had a lower value than their French-Italian predecessors, which weighed 5 grams.

During the revolutions of 1848, the Lombard Provisional Government briefly suspended the production of the lira and minted instead a special 5 Italian lire coin. After the revolutions and the restoration of the Austrian monetary standard, copper coins were reduced in weight. For political purposes the name on these coins (the most popular in circulation) was changed from Kingdom of Lombardy–Venetia to the Austrian Empire.

When metropolitan Austria decimalized in 1857, the change did not immediately affect the Kingdom, where old lira austriaca were minted again in 1858. Only in 1862, after the loss of Lombardy to the newborn Italian State, did the remaining part of the Austrian territories adopt the general coinage of the Empire. The Lombardo-Venetian florin (equal to the Austro-Hungarian florin) became the basic unit of currency, and was divided in 100 soldi; only subunits were specifically produced for the Venetian province. Curiously on these coins, the word Lombardy–Venetia re-appeared, as a sign of revanchism for the lost Lombardy.

== Coins ==
=== Copper coins ===
- 1 centesimo
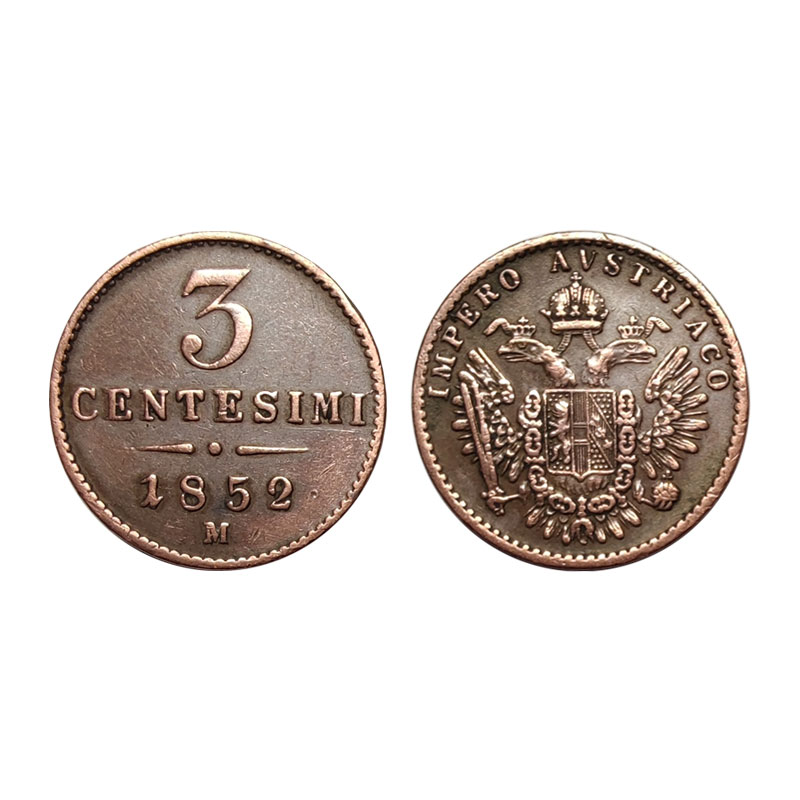
  3 Centesimi 1852
  - Weight: 1.75 grams
  - Type 1852: 1.09 grams
- 3 centesimi
  - Weight: 5.25 grams
  - Type 1852: 3.28 grams
- 5 centesimi
  - Weight: 8.75 grams
  - Type 1852: 5.47 grams
- 10 centesimi
  - Sole issue: 1852
  - Type 1852: 10.94 grams
- 15 centesimi
  - Sole issue: 1852
  - Type 1852: 16.04 grams

=== Silver coins ===
- 1/4 lira
  - Value: 25 cents
  - Purity: 6/10
  - Weight: 1.62 grams
- 1/2 lira
  - Purity: 9/10
  - Weight: 2.17 grams
- 1 lira austriaca
  - Purity: 9/10
  - Weight: 4.33 grams
- 1 fiorino
  - Value: £3
  - Purity: 9/10
  - Weight: 12.99 grams
- 1 scudo
  - Value: £6
  - Purity: 9/10
  - Weight: 25.99 grams

=== Gold coins ===
- 1/2 sovrano
  - Value: £20
  - Purity: 9/10
  - Weight: 5.67 grams
- 1 sovrano
  - Value: £40
  - Purity: 9/10
  - Weight: 11.33 grams

== See also ==
- History of coins in Italy
