= Vezzi porcelain =

Porcelain factory in Venice

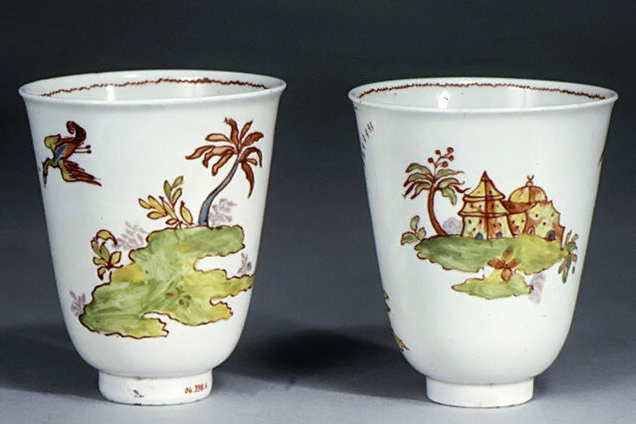
Vezzi porcelain beakers, Metropolitan Museum of Art

Vezzi porcelain is porcelain made by the Vezzi porcelain factory in Venice, Italy, established in 1720 by the Vezzi family. It was the first porcelain factory in Italy, after the experimental Medici porcelain of the 16th century. It operated only until 1727, so surviving pieces are few, probably fewer than 200. It made "true" hard-paste porcelain, and was only the third factory in Europe to do so, hiring technicians from Meissen porcelain and Vienna porcelain, the first two makers.

The great majority of wares are teaware: cups, saucers, teapots and a few small plates. Many cups are beakers without handles, and the teapots, which form an unusually large proportion of the surviving pieces, often have moulded shapes, including relief decoration. The bodies can be white, but often tend to grey; they are very translucent. The shapes often draw from silverware, but they are brightly painted in a variety of styles, influenced by the northern factories and Asian export wares.

== History ==
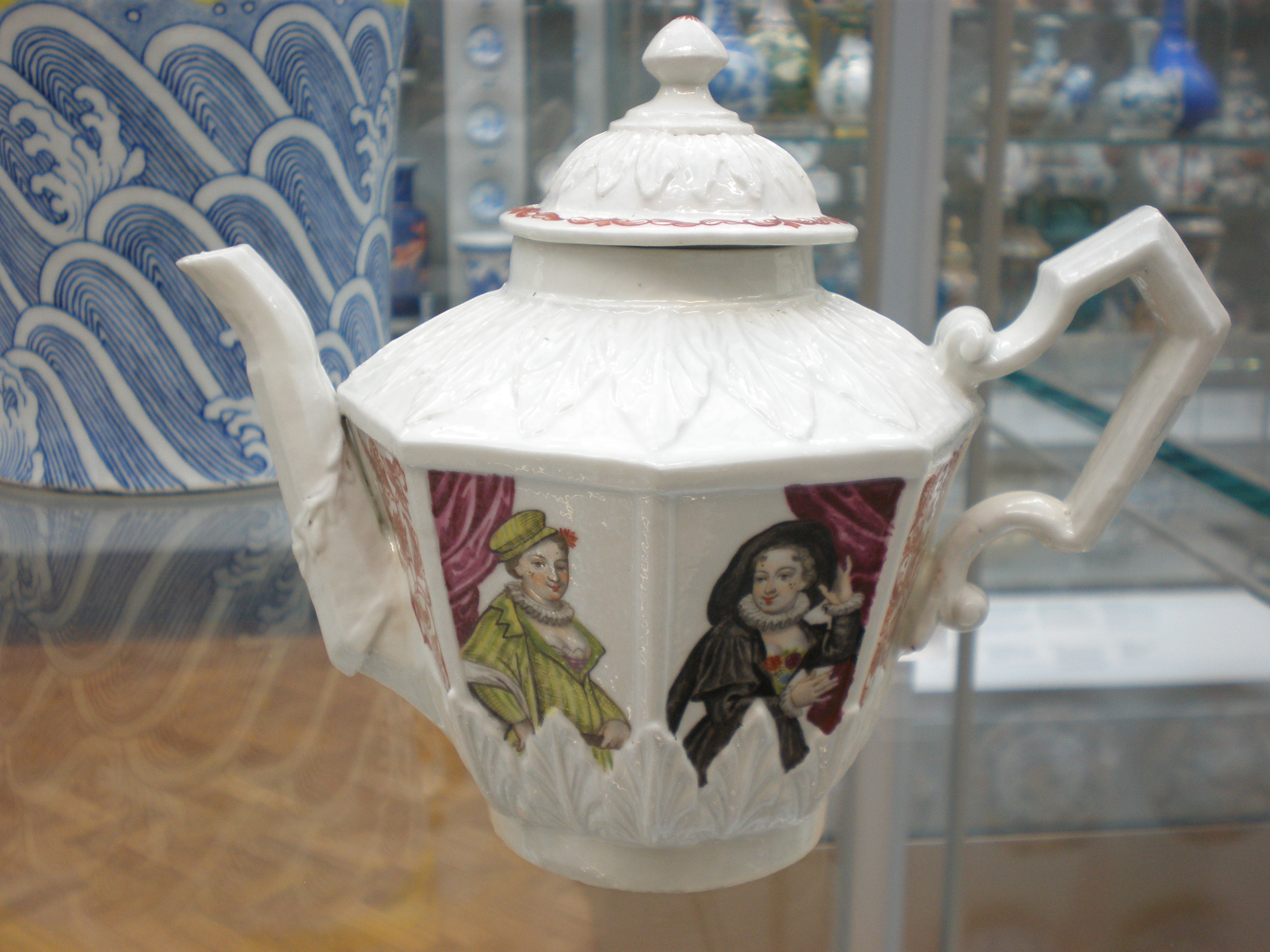
Teapot with relief and painted decoration of actresses, V&A

Francesco Vezzi (1651–1740) was a goldsmith, though more interested in business as a "speculator", and had visited the Vienna factory. He had recently bought a Venetian title of nobility. He financed the factory, run by his son Giovanni (born 1687). They made Christoph Conrad Hunger a partner in 1721. He had worked in Vienna and had visited Meissen, apparently learning some of its secrets. He left Venice in 1724, and returned to Meissen in 1727. This seems to have led to the end of supplies of the vital ingredient kaolin being sent to Venice from Saxony.

There was to be no more porcelain made in Venice between 1727 and 1758, and only the Cozzi porcelain factory was to achieve a lasting success there in the 18th century, operating from 1764 to 1812. The Vezzi factory was at the time unique among European factories in operating on a purely commercial basis. Most other factories were owned by the ruler, as Meissen and later Vienna were, or at least had government support, both moral and financial.

Later, the English factories such as Chelsea and Bow were also to stand alone. Giovanni Vezzi may eventually have faced opposition even from his father Francesco, perhaps because his new peer group in the Venetian nobility felt that owning a smoky manufacturing business in the city was inappropriate behaviour. In 1727 an agreement between father and son cancelled the latter's debts but required him to destroy the kilns.

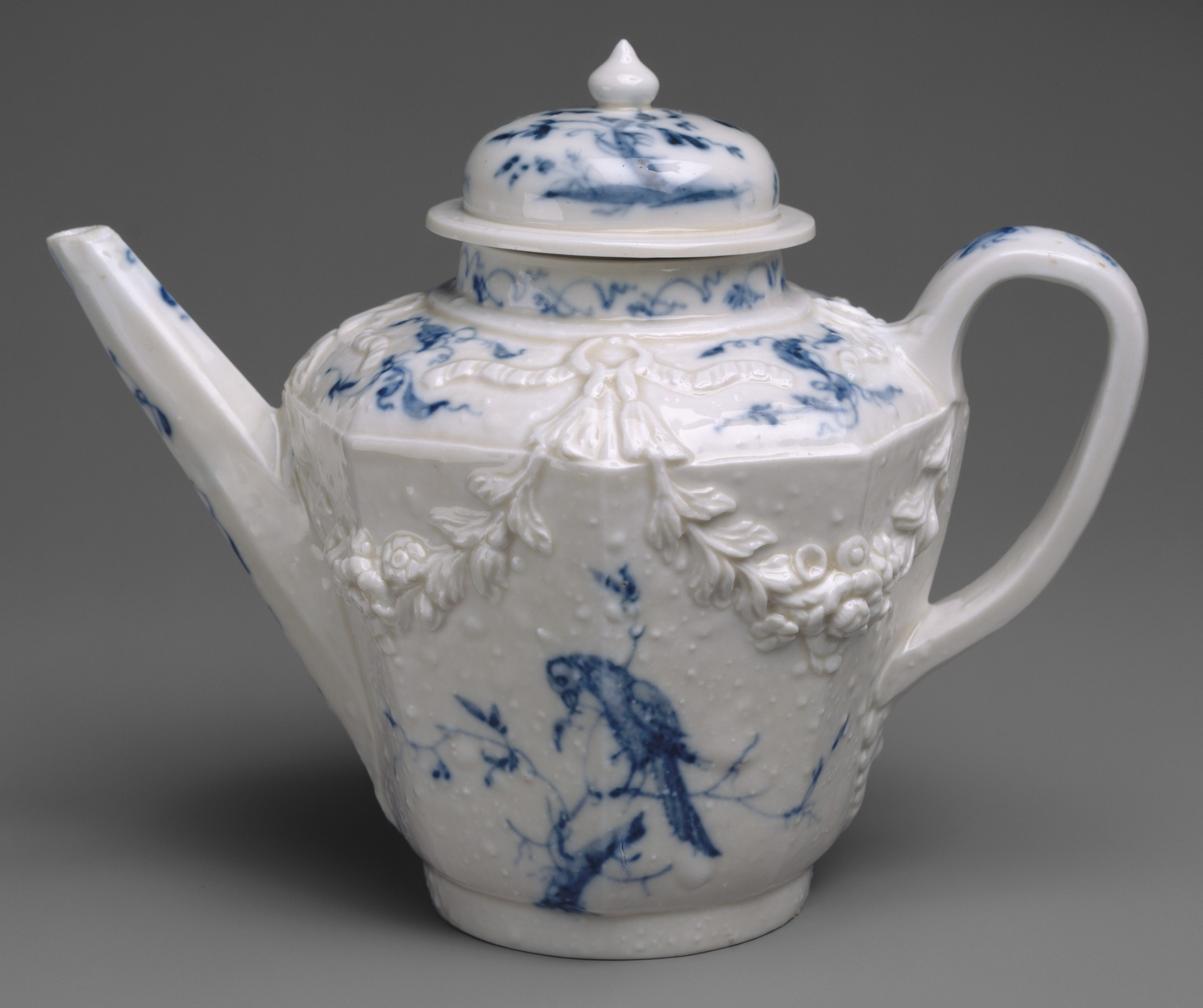
Teapot with relief and painted decoration

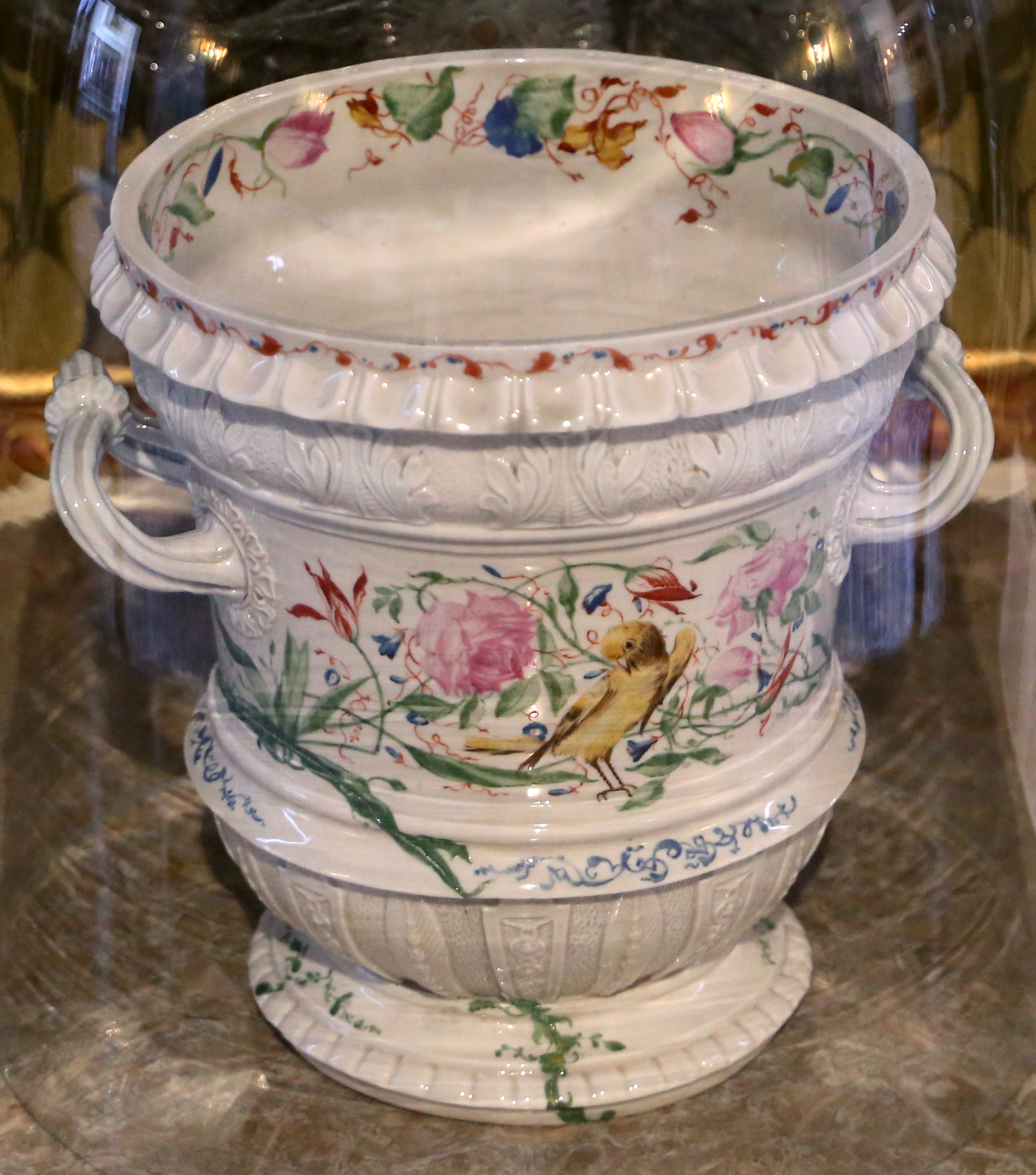
Vase

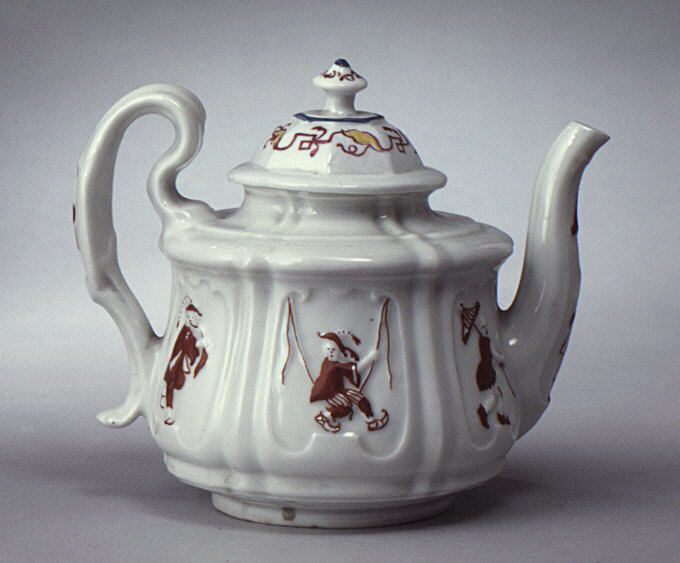
Teapot with relief and painted decoration

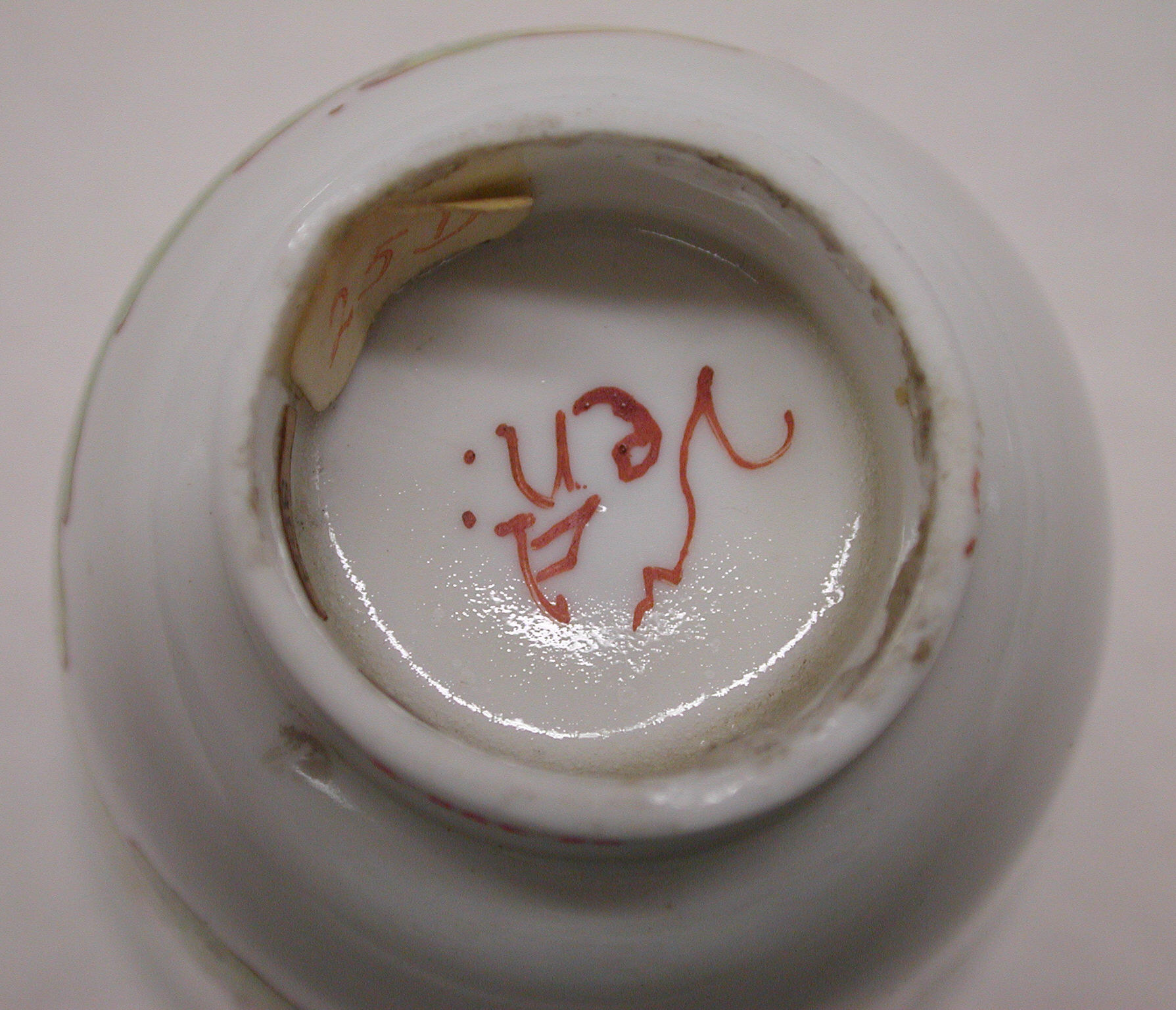
Mark with "Vena." for "Venice"

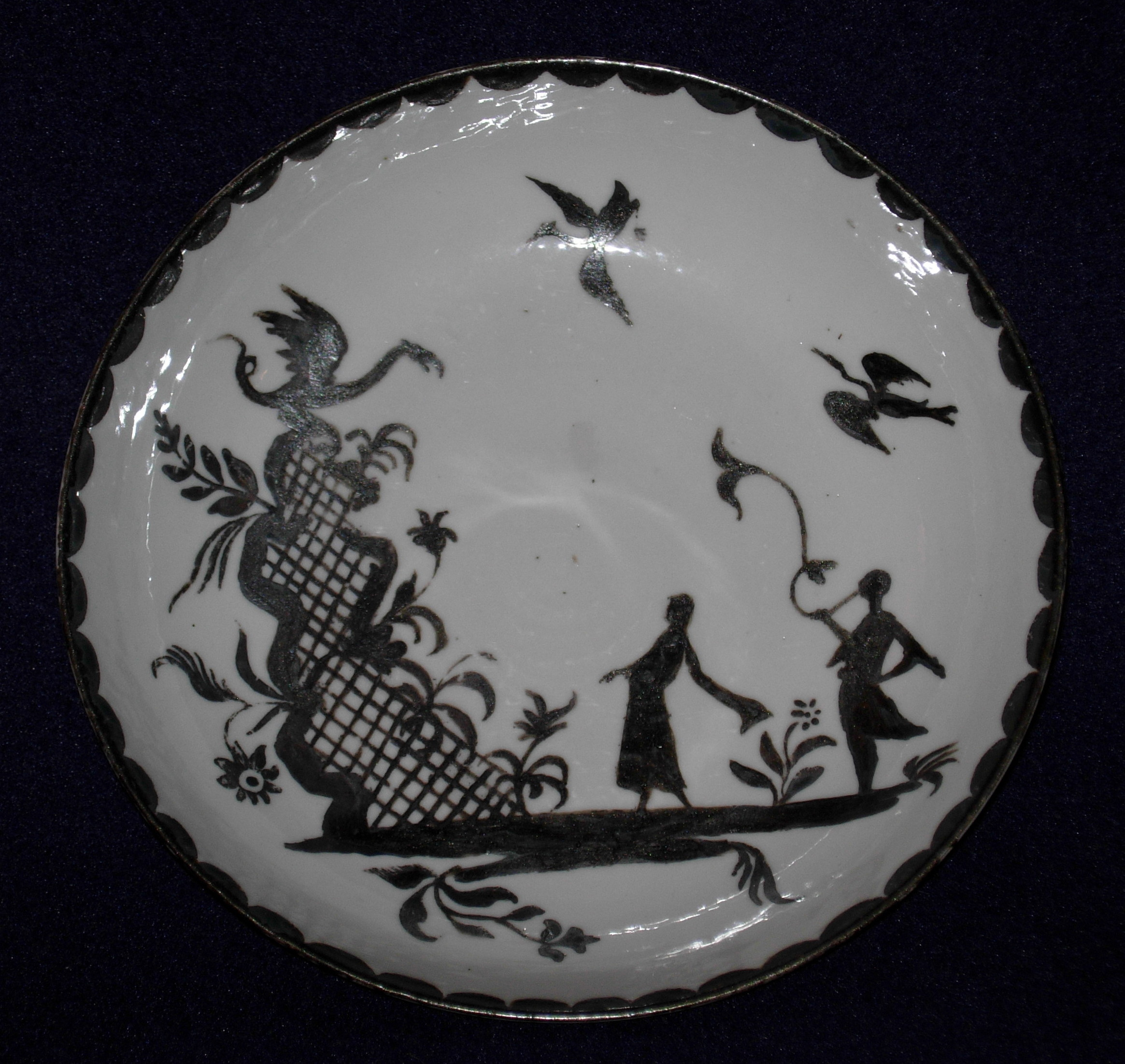
Plate (black and white photo)

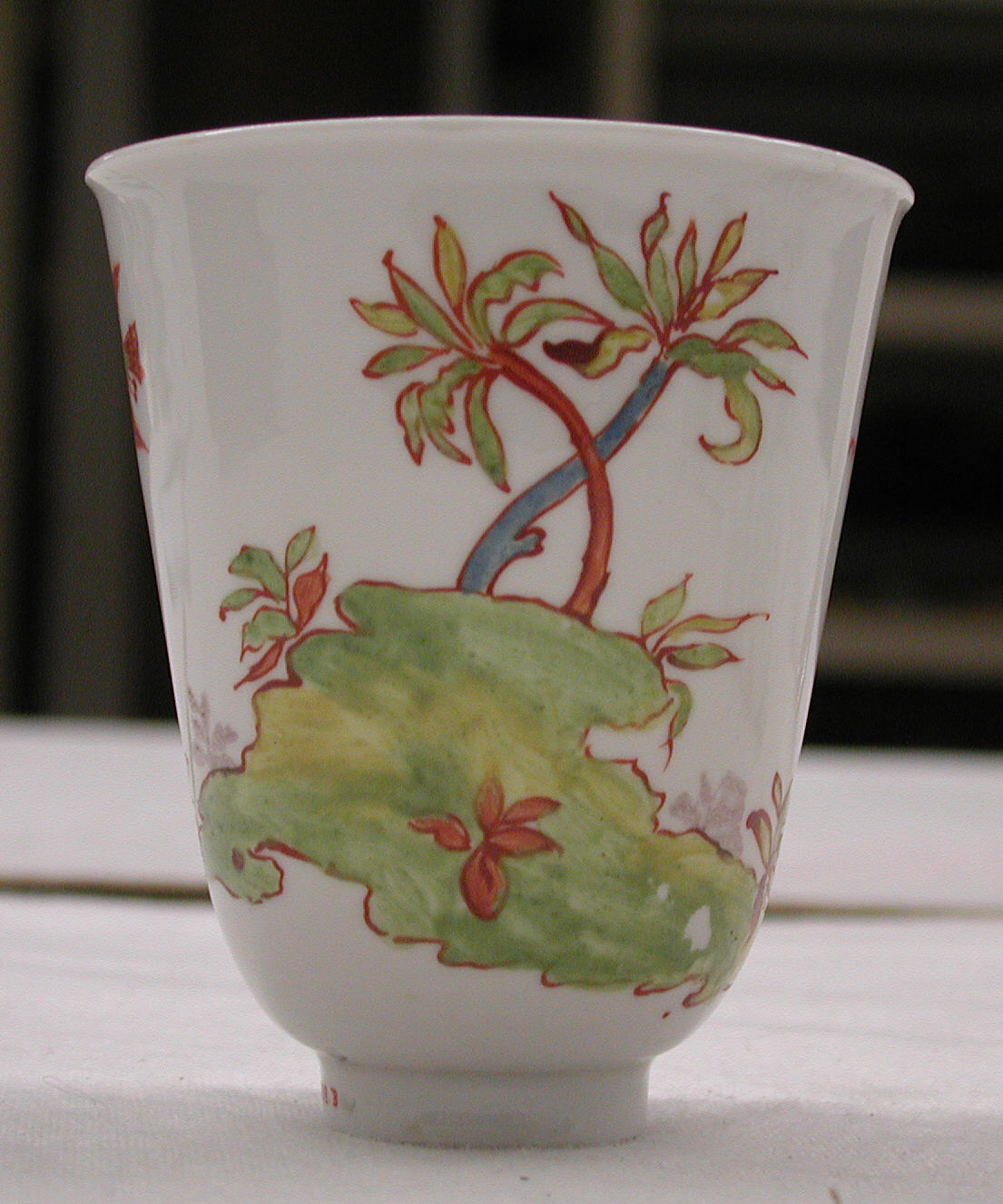
Beaker (other side of one at top)
