= Nove =

- Comune
- Comune di Nove
- Coat of arms

- Location within Italy Location within Veneto
- Coordinates: 45°44′N 11°41′E
- Country: Italy
- Region: Veneto
- Province: Vicenza (VI)
- Frazioni: Crosara

Government
  - Mayor: Manuele Bozzetto (Lega Nord-Northern League)

Area
  - Total: 8 km^{2} (3.1 sq mi)
- Elevation: 84 m (276 ft)

Population (31 December 2014)
  - Total: 5,069
  - Density: 630/km^{2} (1,600/sq mi)
- Demonym: Novesi
- Time zone: UTC+1 (CET)
  - Summer (DST): UTC+2 (CEST)
- Postal code: 36055
- Dialing code: 0424
- Patron saint: Sts. Peter and Paul
- Saint day: June 29
- Website: Official website

Nove is a town and comune in the province of Vicenza in the region of Veneto, north-eastern Italy, with just over 5,000 inhabitants. It is located on the Brenta river, near Marostica and Bassano del Grappa.

The town is home of a local network of ceramic industries.

The name of the town comes from the antique Italian nove, in the meaning of "new". As matter of fact, the lands where the town is located were considered new because of the lowering of the level of the Brenta. The lowering of the river revealed soft lands rich of clay. The first artisans of the area started using the clay for the production of pottery.

The town have a beautiful ceramic museum with a Pablo Picasso gallipot and other important pieces of the 18th and 19th century.

== International relations ==
Nove is twinned with:

- Welkenraedt, Belgium
- Langhirano, Italy
- Montelupo Fiorentino, Italy
- Carlos Barbosa, Brazil
