= Venetian lira =

Currency of Venice

The lira (plural lire) was the distinct currency of Venice until 1848, when it was replaced by the Italian lira. It originated from the Carolingian monetary system used in much of Western Europe since the 8th century CE, with the lira subdivided into 20 soldi, each of 12 denari.

== History ==
From its initial value of 305.94 g fine silver, the Venetian lira had depreciated so much in value over its 1,000-year lifetime that this original unit was referred to from 1200 CE as the lira piccola (small lira) in comparison to larger units of the same name. The denaro or piccolo worth 1/240 lira was the only coin produced between 800–1200nbspCE. Initially weighing 1.7 g fine silver, it was gradually debased over the centuries until it contained only 0.08 g fine silver by 1200 CE.

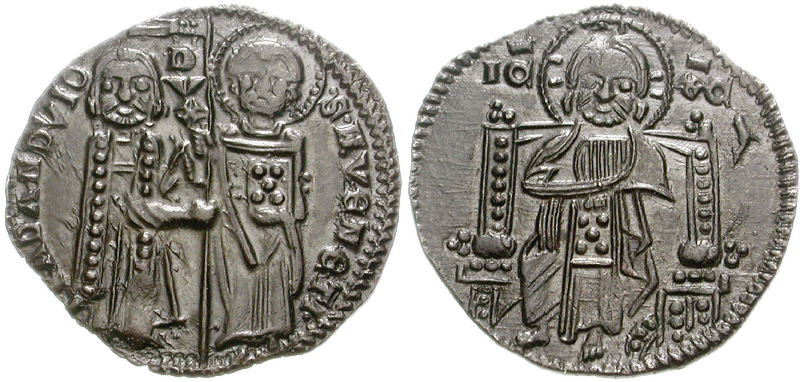
Silver grosso of Francesco Dandolo, 1328–1339

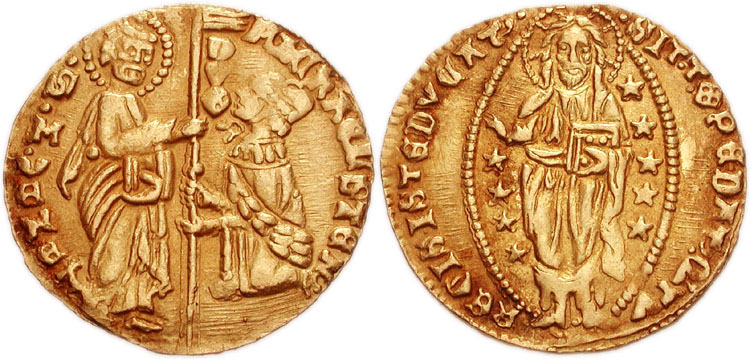
Gold ducat (zecchino) of doge Michele Steno, 1400–1413

The Venetian grosso then became Venice's most important silver coin from the 13th to 15th centuries. It contained 2.1 g fine silver and was valued in 1200 CE at 26 denari piccoli, increasing to 48 piccoli by 1350. The lira di grossi was then invented as a monetary unit equal to 240 grossi and increasing in value from 26 to 48 lire piccole.

The gold ducat then became an even more popular Venetian coin from the 13th to 19th centuries. Issued in 1284 in imitation of the Florentine florin and containing around 3.5 g fine gold, it was initially valued at 2.4 lire piccole or 18 silver grossi (each grosso then worth 32 piccoli). By 1472 its value has increased to 6.2 lire piccole.

By 1472 the lira di grossi gave way to the ducat accounting unit, equal to 1/10 the lira di grossi or 24 grossi, and fixed at 6.2 lire or 124 soldi piccoli. Confusion then set in the 16th century when the accounting ducat became worth less than the gold ducat, leading to the gold coin being called the zecchino (English: sequin) and understood to be worth more than the accounting ducat of 6.2 lire.

The various currency systems of Italy became of less importance to European trade after the Age of Discovery in the 16th century; nonetheless Venice continued to issue new coins. The scudo d'argento of 30.1 g fine silver was introduced in 1578 for 7 lire, rising to 12.4 lire by 1739. The tollero of 23.4 g fine silver was issued in 1797 for 10 lire.

The Venetian lira piccola was supplanted in the 19th century by the Italian lira of the Napoleonic Kingdom of Italy in 1806 and the Lombardy-Venetian lira of the Austrian Empire. The Italian lira was reintroduced by the Republic of San Marco in 1848 at par with the French franc, which finally replaced all previous currencies as well as the lira piccola, with the latter valued at 0.5116 Italian lira.

== Coins ==
A huge variety of coins were minted under their post-1750 currency system when the lira piccola contained 2.4 grams fine silver, with many coins having unique names as follows:

- Copper 1/2 soldo (bezzo)
- Billon 1 soldo (marchetto), 2 soldi (gazetto, from which the gazette was named after), 5, 10, 15 soldi and 30 soldi (lirazza)
- Silver Ducatello or Ducato Effettivo: 8 lire (also in fractions of 1/2, 1/4 & 1/8)
- Silver Ducatone or Giustiniano: 11 lire (also in fractions of 1/2, 1/4 & 1/8)
- Silver Scudo d'Argento or Scudo della Croce: 12.4 lire (also in fractions of 1/2, 1/4 & 1/8)
- Gold Zecchino (or sequin, ducat; also in multiples): 22 lire
- Gold Doppio (also called doubloon or pistole): 38 lire.

The provisional government issued silver tolleros worth 10 lire piccole in 1797. These were followed during the Austrian occupation by silver 1/2, 1, 1 1/2 and 2 lire provinciale worth much less than the lira piccola. Rejection of these coins led to the later issuance of the lira austriaca from 1815 to 1848.

== Sources ==
- Krause, Chester L.; Clifford Mishler (1978). Standard Catalog of World Coins: 1979 Edition. Colin R. Bruce II (senior editor) (5th ed.). Krause Publications. ISBN 0873410203.
