= List of £1 banknotes and coins =

This is a list of £1 banknotes, bills, and coins.

== Current currencies ==
- Sterling
  - British one pound coin and sovereign
  - Royal Bank of Scotland £1 note
  - Bank of England £1 note (demonetised)
- Egyptian £1 coin and note
- Falklands £1 coin
- Gibraltarian £1 coin
- Guernsey £1 coin and note
- Manx £1 coin
- Jersey £1 coin and note
- South Sudanese £1 SSP coin
- Sudanese LS 1 coin
- Saint Helena £1 coin and note

== Obsolete currencies ==
- Australian £A 1 note
- Bahamian £1 note
- Bermudian £1 note
- Biafran £1 note
- British £1 note
- British West African 20/– note
- Canadian £1 note
- Cypriot £C 1 note
- Fijian £1 note
- Gambian £1 note
- Ghanaian £1 note
- Irish pound
  - Series A IR£1 note
  - Series B IR£1 note
  - Irish IR£1 coin
- Israeli IL1 note and coin
- Jamaican £1 note
- Libyan £L1 note
- Maltese £M 1 note and coin
- New Brunswick £1 note
- Newfoundland £1 note
- New Guinea £1 note
- New Zealand £NZ 1 note
- Nigerian £1 note
- Nova Scotian £1 note
- Oceanian £1 note
- Palestinian £P1 note
- Prince Edward Island £1 note
- Rhodesia and Nyasaland £1 note
  - Rhodesian £1 note
  - Southern Rhodesian £1 note
  - Malawian £1 note
  - Zambian £1 note
- Solomon Islands £1 note
- South African £SA 1 note
- South West African £1 note
- Thirteen Colonies:
  - Connecticut £1 bill
  - Delawarean £1 bill
  - Georgian £1 bill
  - Maryland £1 bill
  - Massachusettsan £1 bill
  - New Hampshire £1 bill
  - New Jerseyan £1 bill
  - New York £1 bill
  - North Carolinian £1 bill
  - Pennsylvanian £1 bill
  - Rhode Island £1 bill
  - South Carolinian £1 bill
  - Virginian £1 bill
- Tongan £1 note
- Western Samoan £1 note

== See also ==
- List of £5 banknotes and coins
- List of £10 banknotes, bills, and coins
