= Pound (currency) =

Unit of currency

Countries where a unit of the national currency is pound (dark blue) or lira (light blue)

Pound is a name of various base units of currency, and the name of some of those currencies by extension. It is used in some countries today and previously was used in many others. The English word pound derives from the Latin expression lībra pondō, 'a pound by weight', in which lībra means 'scale' or 'balance' and pondō means 'pound' or 'weight'. The currency's symbol is £, a stylised form of the blackletter L ($\mathfrak{L}$) (from libra), crossed to indicate abbreviation.

The term was adopted in England from the weight (Note: The Pound (mass) in question was a Tower pound (5,400 grains, 349.9 grams or 11.25 troy ounces, about 0.77 avoirdupois pounds, also called the Moneyers' Pound (referring to the Saxon moneyers before the Conquest). "In practice they" [the silver pennies] "varied considerably in weight and 240 of them seldom added up to a pound".) of silver used to make 240 pennies, and eventually spread to British colonies all over the world. Although silver penny mintage began seven centuries earlier, the first pound coin was minted under Henry VII in 1489.

== Countries and territories currently using currency units named pound ==
Country/territory	Currency	ISO 4217 code	Tied to sterling?
Egypt	Egyptian pound	EGP	No
Falkland Islands	Falkland Islands pound	FKP	Yes
Gibraltar	Gibraltar pound	GIP	Yes
Guernsey	Guernsey pound	GBP	Yes
Alderney	Alderney pound	GBP (informally)	Yes
Isle of Man	Manx pound	GBP	Yes
Jersey	Jersey pound	GBP	Yes
Lebanon	Lebanese pound	LBP	No
Saint Helena, Ascension and Tristan da Cunha	Saint Helena pound	SHP	Yes
South Sudan	South Sudanese pound	SSP	No
Sudan	Sudanese pound	SDG	No
Syrian Arab Republic	Syrian pound	SYP	No
United Kingdom	Sterling (Note: The correct name for the currency is "sterling" and the "pound" is its primary unit. When necessary to distinguish sterling from other pounds, the qualified names "pound sterling" or "British pound" are used, especially in international trade contexts, where those names are used even when disambiguation is not needed. This qualified form is almost never encountered in the United Kingdom, except in banking.)	GBP	N/A
British Antarctic Territory	Sterling	GBP	N/A
British Indian Ocean Territory	Sterling	GBP	N/A
South Georgia and the South Sandwich Islands	Sterling	GBP	N/A

== Historical currencies ==
- Australian pound (until 1966, replaced by the Australian dollar). The Australian pound was also used in the Gilbert and Ellice Islands, Nauru, New Hebrides and Papua and New Guinea. It was replaced in the New Hebrides/Vanuatu in 1981 by the Vanuatu vatu.
- Bahamian pound (until 1966, replaced by the Bahamian dollar)
- Bermudian pound (until 1970, replaced by the Bermudian dollar)
- Biafran pound (1968 to 1970, replaced by the Nigerian pound)
- British West African pound
  - in British Cameroons replaced by the CFA franc in 1961 (for its southern part)
  - in Gambia, replaced by the Gambian pound in 1968
  - in Ghana, replaced by the Ghanaian pound in 1958
  - in Liberia, replaced by the U.S. dollar in 1943
  - in Nigeria, replaced by the Nigerian pound in 1958
  - in Sierra Leone, replaced by the leone in 1964
- Canadian pound (until 1859, replaced by the Canadian dollar)
- Cypriot pound (Cyprus and Sovereign Base Areas of Akrotiri and Dhekelia, until 1 January 2008, replaced by the euro)
- Fijian pound (until 1969, replaced by the Fijian dollar)
- Gambian pound (1968 to 1971, replaced by the dalasi)
- Ghanaian pound (1958 to 1965, replaced by the cedi)
- Irish pound (Irish: Punt na hÉireann) (until 2002, replaced by the euro)
- Israeli pound, also known as the Israeli lira (until 1980, replaced by the shekel)
- Jamaican pound (until 1968, replaced by the Jamaican dollar). The Jamaican pound was also used in Cayman Islands and Turks and Caicos Islands until 1968.
- Jordanian pound; see Palestine pound, below.
- Libyan pound (until 1971, replaced by the Libyan dinar)
- Malawian pound (1964 to 1970, replaced by the Malawian kwacha)
- Maltese pound (also known as the Maltese lira and replaced by the euro on 1 January 2008)
- New Brunswick pound (until 1860, replaced by the New Brunswick dollar)
- Newfoundland pound (until 1865, replaced by the Newfoundland dollar)
- New Guinean pound
- New Zealand pound (until 1967, replaced by the New Zealand dollar). The New Zealand pound was also used in the Cook Islands and the Pitcairn Islands.
- Nigerian pound (1958 to 1973, replaced by the naira)
- Nova Scotian pound (until 1860, replaced by the Nova Scotian dollar)
- Oceanian pound (1942-1945 under Japanese occupation of Kiribati, Nauru, New Guinea, Solomon Islands and Tuvalu)
- Palestine pound (replaced by the Israeli pound; also served as Jordanian pound, replaced in Jordan by the Jordanian dinar)
- Pound Scots of Scotland (until 1707 union with England)
- Prince Edward Island pound (until 1871, replaced by the Prince Edward Island dollar)
- Rhodesian pound (1964 until 1970 in Rhodesia, replaced by the Rhodesian dollar)
- Rhodesia and Nyasaland pound (1955-1964, replaced in Southern Rhodesia renamed Rhodesia by the Rhodesian pound, in Northern Rhodesia renamed Zambia by the Zambian pound, and in Nyasaland renamed Malawi by the Malawian pound)
- Samoan pound (1914–1920 provisional issue by the New Zealand Government military administration. 1920–1959 by the New Zealand Government administration (Treasury notes). 1960–1963 by the Bank of Western Samoa. Replaced 1967 by the tala ($).)
- Scottish pound: see Pound Scots, above.
- Solomon Islands pound (1916-1932, replaced by the Australian pound)
- South African pound (until 1961, replaced by South African rand). The South African pound was also used in Basutoland, Bechuanaland, South West Africa and Swaziland.
- South African Republic pond (refers to the republic in Transvaal, issued 1867–1902, replaced by the South African pound)
- South West African pound (1930s to 1961, replaced by South African rand)
- Southern Rhodesian pound (1896-1955, circulated also in Northern Rhodesia and Nyasaland; replaced by Rhodesia and Nyasaland pound)
- Sudanese pound (until 1992 and since January 2007)
- Tongan pound (1921–1966 Government of Tonga Treasury notes. 1967 replaced by the pa'anga ($))
- Transvaal pound (see above, South African Republic pond)
- West Indian pound (until 1949, replaced by East Caribbean dollar)
- Western Samoan pound (1920-1967, replaced by Samoan tala)
- Zambian pound (1964 to 1968, replaced by the Zambian kwacha)

=== Currencies of the former British colonies in America ===
All of the following currencies have been replaced by the US dollar.

- Connecticut pound (Connecticut Colony)
- Delaware pound (Delaware Colony)
- Georgia pound (Province of Georgia)
- Maryland pound (Province of Maryland)
- Massachusetts pound (Province of Massachusetts Bay)
- New Hampshire pound (Province of New Hampshire)
- New Jersey pound (Province of New Jersey)
- New York pound (Province of New York)
- North Carolina pound (Province of North Carolina)
- Pennsylvania pound (Province of Pennsylvania)
- Rhode Island pound (Colony of Rhode Island and Providence Plantations)
- South Carolina pound (Province of South Carolina)
- Virginia pound (Colony of Virginia)

== See also ==
- Green pound, used within the European Union's Common Agricultural Policy until 1999
- Carolingian pound (Latin: libra), a unit of weight and coinage, ancestor of German: Pfund, French: livre, Spanish: peso, Lira (Italian: lira, Turkish: lira) as well as the English word pound
  - Libra (weight), an ancient Roman unit of weight, basis for the Carolingian pound
- Local exchange trading system: many British LETS use(d) the term "pound"
  - Bristol pound, a LETS unit
- Sterling area, a group of countries historically either adopted or pegged their currencies to the pound sterling
