= List of £5 banknotes and coins =

This is a list of £5 banknotes, bills, and coins.

== Current currencies ==
- Sterling:
  - British £5 coin
  - Bank of England £5 note
  - Bank of Scotland £5 note
  - Bank of Ireland £5 note
  - Clydesdale Bank £5 note
  - Royal Bank of Scotland £5 note
  - Ulster Bank £5 note
- Egyptian £5 note
- Falklands £5 note
- Gibraltarian £5 note
- Guernsey £5 note
- Manx £5 note
- Jersey £5 note
- Saint Helena £5 note
- South Sudanese £5 SSP note
- Sudanese LS 5 note
- Syrian LS 5 coin

== Obsolete currencies ==
- Australian £A 5 note
- Bahamian £5 note
- Bermudian £5 note
- Biafran £5 note
- British West African 100/– note
- Canadian £5 note
- Cypriot £C 5 note
- Fijian £5 note
- Gambian £5 note
- Ghanaian £5 note
- Irish pound
  - Series A IR£5 note
  - Series B IR£5 note
  - Series C IR£5 note
- Israeli IL5 note and coin
- Jamaican £5 note
- Libyan £L5 note
- Maltese £M 5 note
- New Brunswick £5 note
- New Zealand £NZ 5 note
- Nigerian £5 note
- Nova Scotian £5 note
- Palestinian £P5 note
- Prince Edward Island £5 note
- Rhodesia and Nyasaland £5 note
  - Rhodesian £5 note
  - Southern Rhodesian £5 note
  - Malawian £5 note
  - Zambian £5 note
- Solomon Islands £5 note
- South African £SA 5 note
- South West African £5 note
- Tongan £5 note
- Western Samoan £5 note

== See also ==
- List of £1
- List of £10
