= £sd =

Pre-decimal currencies

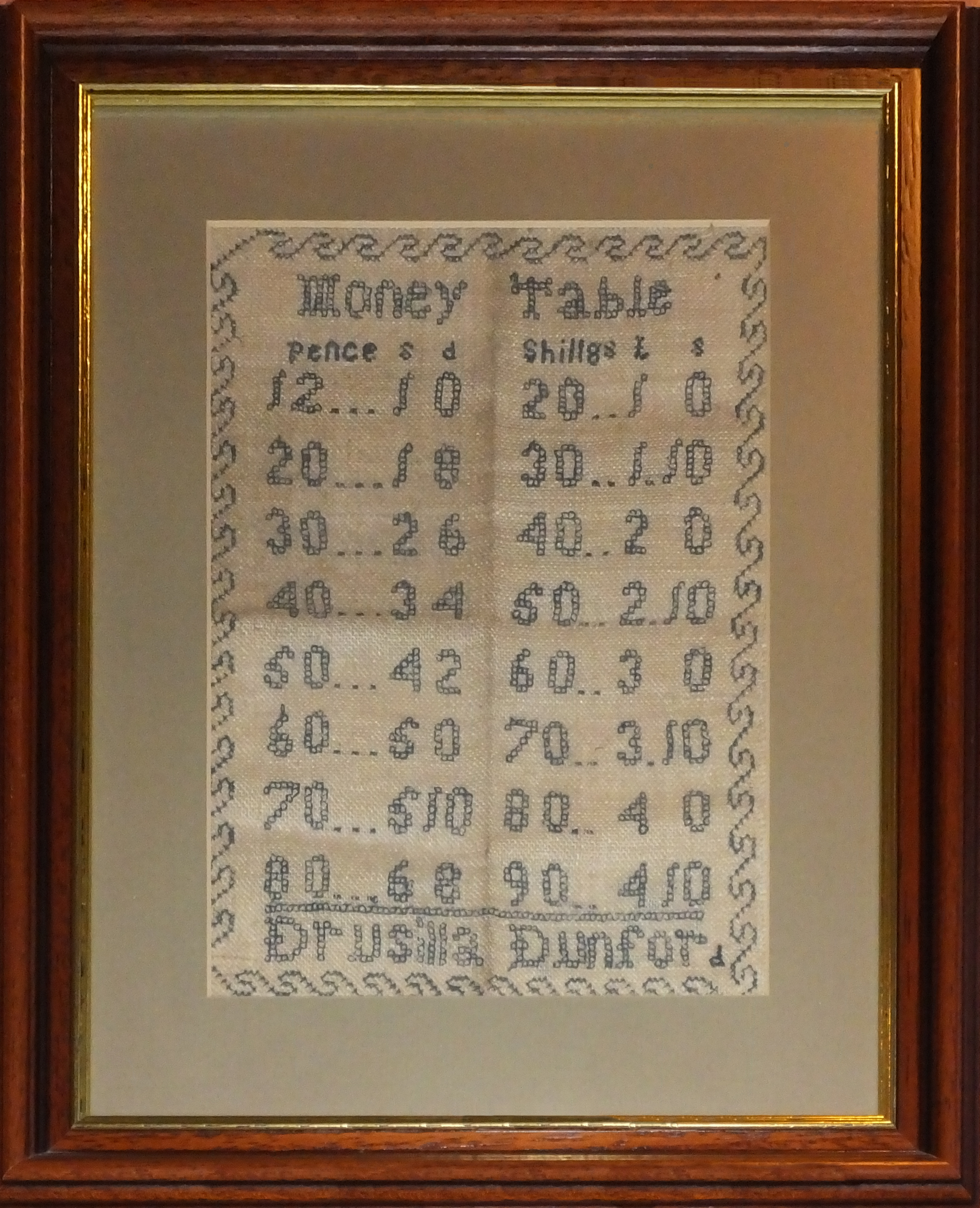
A sampler in the Guildhall Museum of Rochester illustrates the conversion between pence and shillings and shillings and pounds.

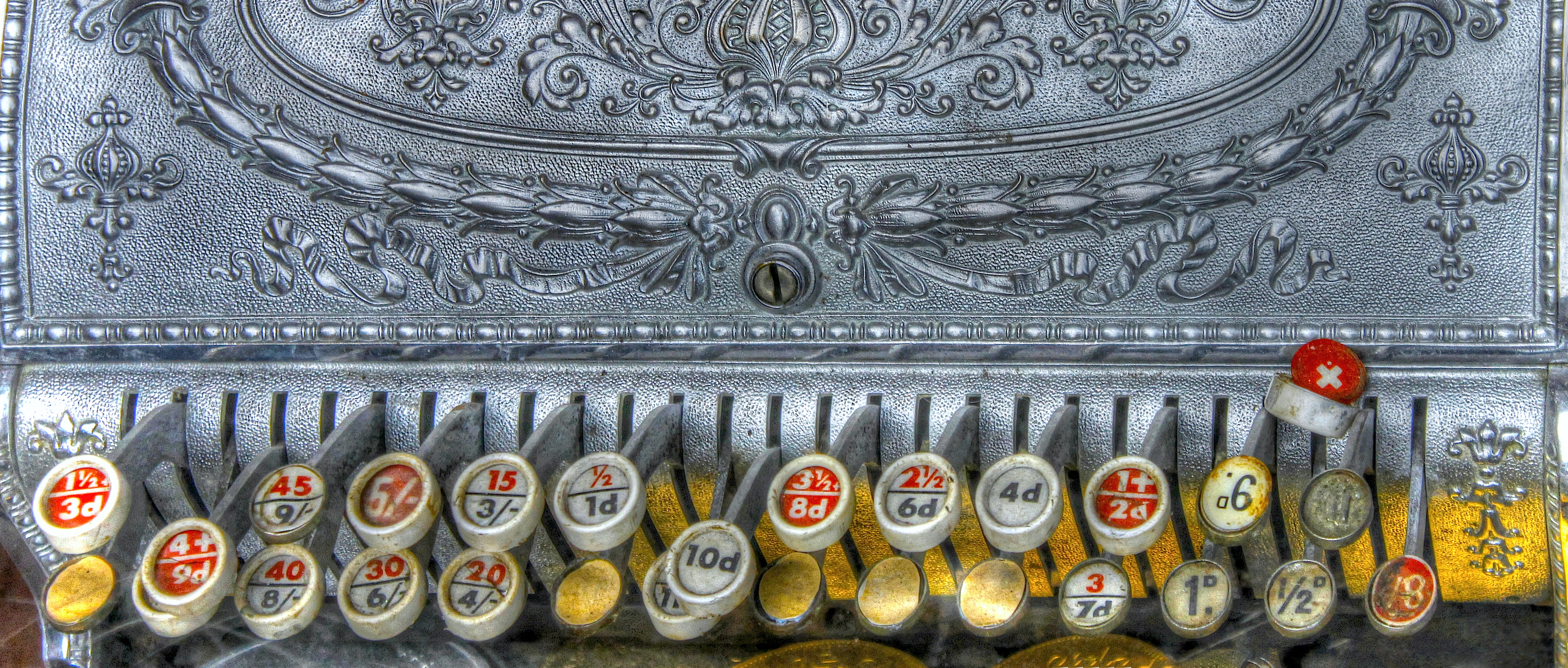
Old till in Ireland, with "shortcut" keys in various £sd denominations (lower numbers) and their "new pence" equivalent (upper numbers)

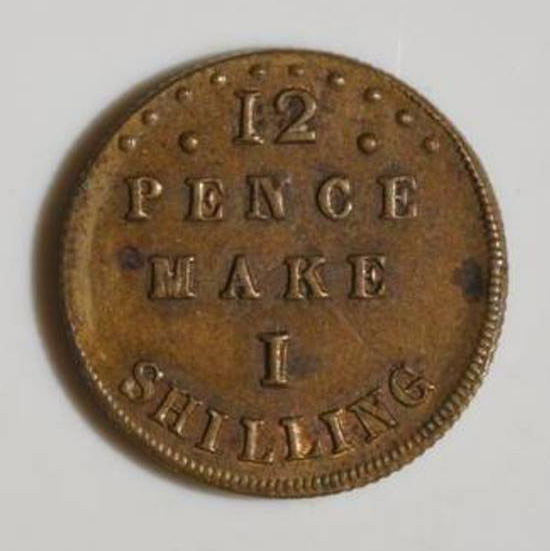
Toy coin, which teaches children the value of a shilling

£sd (occasionally written Lsd (Note: The modern £ symbol is a stylised form of the letter L as written in blackletter type – like $\mathfrak{L}$ – with a stroke to indicate that it is an abbreviation of the word Libra (see Pound sign § Origin for details).)) is the popular name for the pre-decimal currencies once common throughout Europe. The abbreviation originates from the Latin currency denominations librae, solidi, and denarii. Under this system, there were 12 denarii in a solidus and 20 solidi (or 240 denarii) in a libra. In the countries of the (former) British Empire, these were called pounds, shillings, and pence (pence being the plural of penny), with 12 pence in a shilling and 20 shillings in a pound.

Although the names originated from popular coins in the classical Roman Empire, their definitions and the ratios between them were introduced and imposed across Western Europe by Carolingian Emperor Charlemagne. King Offa of Mercia adopted the Frankish silver standard of librae, solidi, and denarii into Britain in the late 8th century.

The £sd system was the standard across much of the European continent for over a thousand years, until the decimalisations of the 18th and 19th centuries. The United Kingdom was one of the few countries that retained it into the 20th century, and so the system became particularly associated with Britain. For much of the 20th century, £sd remained the monetary notation of most countries in the (former) British Empire – with the exceptions of Canada and India – until the 1960s and 1970s, with Nigeria being the last to abandon it in the form of the Nigerian pound, on 1 January 1973.

Historically, similar systems based on Roman coinage were used elsewhere; e.g., the division of the livre tournois in France and other pre-decimal currencies such as Spain, which had 20 maravedís to 1 real and 20 reales to 1 duro or 5 pesetas.

== Origins ==
The classical Roman Empire originally used a decimal currency system based on the "as" whereby 1 denarius = 10 asses. The silver denarius was the common circulation coin, but accounting was in sestercii. Later Roman Emperors undertook multiple coinage reforms, redefining weights and coins' relative values and introducing new coins and new accounting systems for them. Since most reforms were not even completed before the next one began, the late Roman Empire had a veritable mess of multiple overlapping systems of weights and currencies.

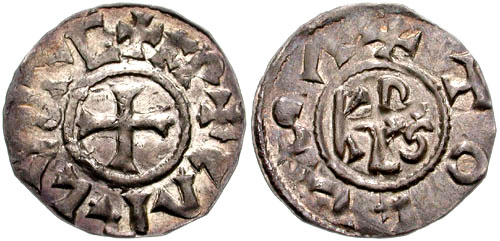
Carolingian denarius

Around the 780s, the Frankish emperor Charlemagne created a new uniform system of coinage. He defined the "libra" as a new measure of weight equivalent to around 408 g (14.4 oz) (Note: There is uncertainty about the value of the original Carolingian pound. Estimates as high as 489.6 g (17.27 oz) can be seen.) (substantially larger than the old Roman pound of 328.9 g (11.60 oz)), and ordered 240 silver units known as denarii to be struck from the new Carolingian pound of pure silver, each denarius containing 22.5 grains (1.46 g) of silver. To simplify the accounting that would be needed in the new system, Charlemagne also decreed that the pound was divisible into 20 solidi, each of 12 denarii. Thus began the Carolingian monetary system (1l. = 20s. = 240d.).

The new coinage and accounting system was imposed uniformly across the vast Carolingian Empire, and was also used in some commerce in neighbouring nations. In the late 8th century, King Offa of Mercia imported the system into Britain to facilitate transactions (notably "Peter's pence") with the Roman Catholic Church (which used the Carolingian coinage system). For some time, the £sd system coexisted with the Viking "mark" accounting system, which had been previously introduced into Danelaw regions. Although £sd ultimately prevailed in Britain, the "mark of account" system lingered on in North Sea trade and areas of Hanseatic influence through much of the Middle Ages.

Charlemagne's new monetary system prevailed across much of Western Europe, including France (where the units were known as the livre, sou and denier), Italy (lira, soldo and denaro), the Holy Roman Empire (Pfund, Schilling and Pfennig) and in England (pound, shilling and penny). The English word pound is derived from the Latin word pondo, and the abbreviation lb comes from the word used for the measurement in Latin, libra (as in the phrase libra pondo, meaning 'a pound weight'). On the Iberian peninsula, the Kingdom of Aragon adopted the Carolingian monetary system (Catalan: lliura, sou and diners), but those of Portugal and Castile (and subsequently Spain) retained the currency system inherited from al-Andalus.

During the early Middle Ages, only the denarius (denier) was issued as an actual coin; the libra and solidus were merely units of account. But over time, Europe's silver resources were gradually exhausted and the coins became repeatedly debased by medieval monarchs, prompting the minting of larger coins from the 13th century. It also led to the specification of currencies by mint of origin in contracts and accounting (e.g. a denier parisis, of the Paris mint, contained more actual silver than the very debased denier tournois of Tours).

To facilitate larger transactions, gold coins began to be minted in western Europe around the same time. The French franc, introduced in 5 December, 1360, was the first coin anywhere to represent exactly £1, and the gold "sovereign", first minted in 1489, was the first English £1 coin. As new coins representing various quantities were introduced, expressions in terms of these new coins (guineas, crowns, farthings, etc.) made their way into the common language. However, the £sd system remained intact in ledger accounting

== Decimalisation ==
Conversion of some British pre-decimalisation currencies, and the decimal equivalent

The £sd system continued in much of Western Europe for nearly a thousand years, until the "decimalisations" of the 18th and 19th centuries. Britain considered following the continental example, and a parliamentary select committee was set up in 1853 to inquire into decimalisation. The committee recommended retaining the £sd system. However, pressure groups formed inside Britain advocating the adoption of decimalisation of the currency, and Parliament returned to the matter in the 1850s. Various decimalisation schemes were considered – the Pound-and-Mil scheme, the Farthing scheme, the Half-penny scheme, the Alb scheme, etc. – but all were determined to have deficiencies, and the transition appeared too difficult and expensive. Thus, the £sd system was maintained in Britain until 1971.

As countries of the British Empire became independent, some abandoned the £sd system quickly, while others retained it almost as long as the UK itself. The United States of America was among the first to drop the £sd system and adopt a decimal currency in 1792, 10 years after independence from the British Empire, but retains many other aspects of the customary units for length and weight. Australia, on the other hand, only changed to using a decimal currency on 14 February 1966. New Zealand did so on 10 July 1967. Still others, notably Ireland, decimalised only when the UK did. The UK abandoned the old penny on Decimal Day, 15 February 1971, when one pound sterling became divided into 100 new pence. This was a change from the system used in the earlier wave of decimalisations in Australia, New Zealand, Rhodesia and South Africa, in which the pound was replaced with a new major currency called either the "dollar" or the "rand". The British shilling was replaced by a 5 new pence coin worth one-twentieth of a pound. In Europe, decimalisation of currency (as well as other weights and measures) began in Revolutionary France with the law of 1795 ("Loi du 18 germinal an III", 7 April 1795), replacing the £sd accounting system of the Ancien régime with a system of 1 franc = 10 decimes = 100 centimes. Decimalisation was propagated by France to neighbouring European countries during the Napoleonic wars. By the mid-19th century, most of continental Europe had decimalised, leaving the United Kingdom as the only major country to continue to operate the £sd system.

All countries and territories that formerly used the £sd system have now decimalised their currency (France and the US in 1790s; Australia, New Zealand, South Africa and Commonwealth countries in the 1960s), with most decimalisations occurring after the Second World War. The British pound sterling and Irish pound were among the next to be decimalised, on 15 February 1971. The last countries to decimalise were Malta decimalised its currency in 1972 and Nigeria decimalised in 1973.

In places where £sd was used, there were several approaches to decimalisation:

- The pound remained the base unit (in Malta, using the Maltese name "lira"), but was subdivided into new fractional units of 1/100 of a pound. The new fractional unit (called the "new penny" in the UK and Ireland and the "cent" in Malta) was worth 2.4 old pence. Malta also created a fractional unit worth 1/1000 of a pound, called the "mil", worth slightly less than a farthing (0.24 old pence).
- A new base unit (often called the "dollar") was created equal to ten shillings (half a pound), and subdivided into 100 fractional units, with one fractional unit (usually called the "cent") equal to 1/10 of a shilling or 1.2 old pence. This was the approach adopted in South Africa (as the Rand), Australia, New Zealand, Jamaica, Fiji and many other countries.
- A new base unit called the "dollar" was created at parity with the US dollar. This was done in Canada in 1858 and in many places in the West Indies in the nineteenth and twentieth centuries. In Bermuda in 1970, as the pound was fixed at US$2.40, i.e. US$1 = 100d., this made the new Bermudian dollar equal to exactly 100 old pence, with the new cent equal to one old penny.
- Some countries have adopted alternative approaches, such as Ghana, which created a new base unit equal to 100 old pence (not equal to the US dollar), with a fractional unit equal to one old penny, Bahamas, which adopted a new base unit equal to seven shillings, with a fractional unit equal to 0.84 old pence, and The Gambia, which created a new base unit equal to four shillings, with a fractional unit equal to 0.48 old pence.

Major currency units before and after decimalisation
New unit	Value of new unit		Old unit	Year of change
New unit	As fraction of old unit	In £sd	Old unit	Year of change
(South Africa) South African rand	0.5	10/–	South African pound	1961
(Sierra Leone) Sierra Leonean leone	0.5	10/–	British West African pound	1964
(Ghana) Ghanaian cedi	0.4167	8/4 (= 100d)	Ghanaian pound	1965
(Australia) Australian dollar	0.5	10/–	Australian pound	1966
(The Bahamas) Bahamian dollar	0.35	7/–	Bahamian pound	1966
New Zealand dollar	0.5	10/–	New Zealand pound	1967
(Samoa) Western Samoan tala	0.5	10/–	Western Samoan pound	1967
(Tonga) Tongan paʻanga	0.5	10/–	Tongan pound	1967
(Zambia) Zambian kwacha	0.5	10/–	Zambian pound	1968
(Jamaica) Jamaican dollar	0.5	10/–	Jamaican pound	1969
(Fiji) Fijian dollar	0.5	10/–	Fijian pound	1969
(Rhodesia) Rhodesian dollar	0.5	10/–	Rhodesian pound	1970
(Bermuda) Bermudian dollar	0.4167	8/4 (= 100d)	Bermudian pound	1970
(The Gambia) Gambian dalasi	0.2	4/–	Gambian pound	1971
(Malawi) Malawian kwacha	0.5	10/–	Malawian pound	1971
(Republic of Ireland) Irish pound	1	£1	Irish pound	1971
(United Kingdom) Pound stg.	1	£1	Pound stg.	1971
(Malta) Maltese lira	1	£M 1	Maltese pound	1972
(Nigeria) Nigerian naira	0.5	10/–	Nigerian pound	1973
This table is not exhaustive.

The following table shows the conversion rates of common denominations of coins of the £sd systems. The 1/2d, 1d and 3d coins were all demonetised on decimalisation; in the UK and Ireland, the 6d (as 2 1/2p) continued in use until demonetised subsequently.

Coin	Amount	New £p (e.g. UK)	New $c (e.g. NZ)
Halfpenny	1/2d.	5/24p ≈ 0.2083p	5/12c ≈ 0.4167c
Penny	1d.	5/12p ≈ 0.4167p	5/6c ≈ 0.8333c
Threepence	3d.	1 1/4p	2 1/2c
Sixpence	6d.	2 1/2p	5c
Shilling	1/–	5p	10c
Florin	2/–	10p	20c
Half crown	2/6	12 1/2p	25c

The following coins were not in common circulation in the UK at the time of decimalisation, though the ten shilling note and the pound note were.

Common name	Amount	New £p (e.g. UK)	New $c (e.g. NZ)
Double florin	4/-	20p	25c
Crown	5/–	25p	50c
Half sovereign	10/–	50p	$1
Sovereign	£1	£1	$2

The half crown might have continued in use as 12 1/2p but had already been demonetised.

== Pre-decimal coins and banknotes ==
The penny was subdivided into 4 farthings (1/4d) until 31 December 1960, when they ceased to be legal tender in the UK and Ireland. Until 31 July 1969, there was also a halfpenny (1/2d) in circulation. The last £sd coins to cease being legal tender in the UK after Decimal Day were the sixpence (withdrawn 30 June 1980), the shilling (withdrawn 31 December 1990) and the florin (withdrawn 30 June 1993). Commemorative crowns minted post decimalisation (worth either 25p or £5) are still legal tender, but are rarely, if ever, spent.

The last £sd banknote to cease to be legal tender anywhere was the Isle of Man ten shilling note, which ceased to be legal tender there in 2013.

== Computing ==
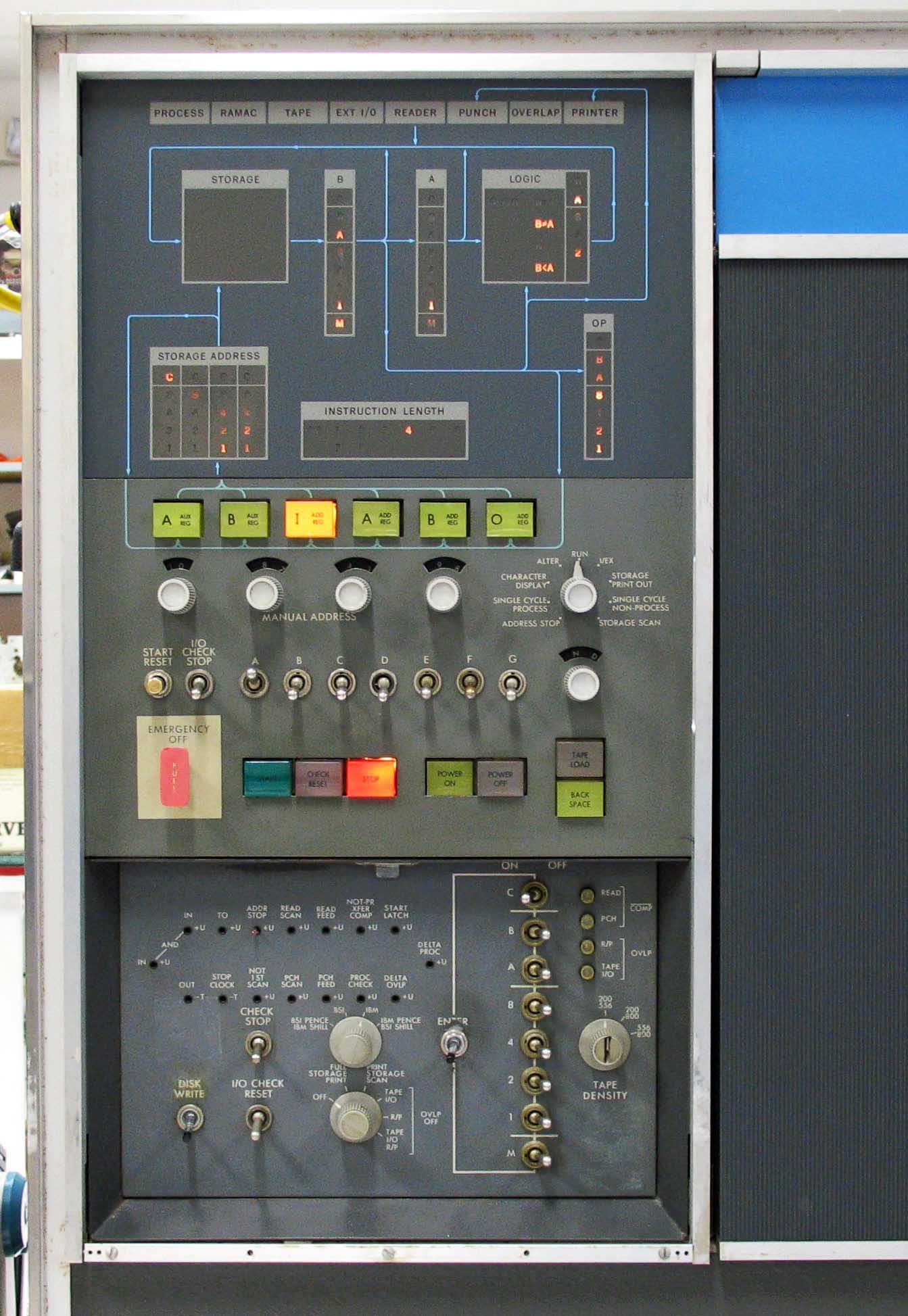
1401 Console and, below, the Auxiliary Console. The grey knob nearest the centre of the Auxiliary Console mentions "PENCE" and "SHILL".

Computers and calculators sold pre-decimalisation – mostly in the 1960s – occasionally came with special support for the £sd system in the form of a fixed-point currency datatype. The IBM 1401 is one such machine; on Sterling models with £sd support, it had a switch for selecting between IBM and BSI data layouts of £sd on its auxiliary console (see image). The ICT 1301 and the PL/I language also had £sd support.

== Writing conventions and pronunciations ==
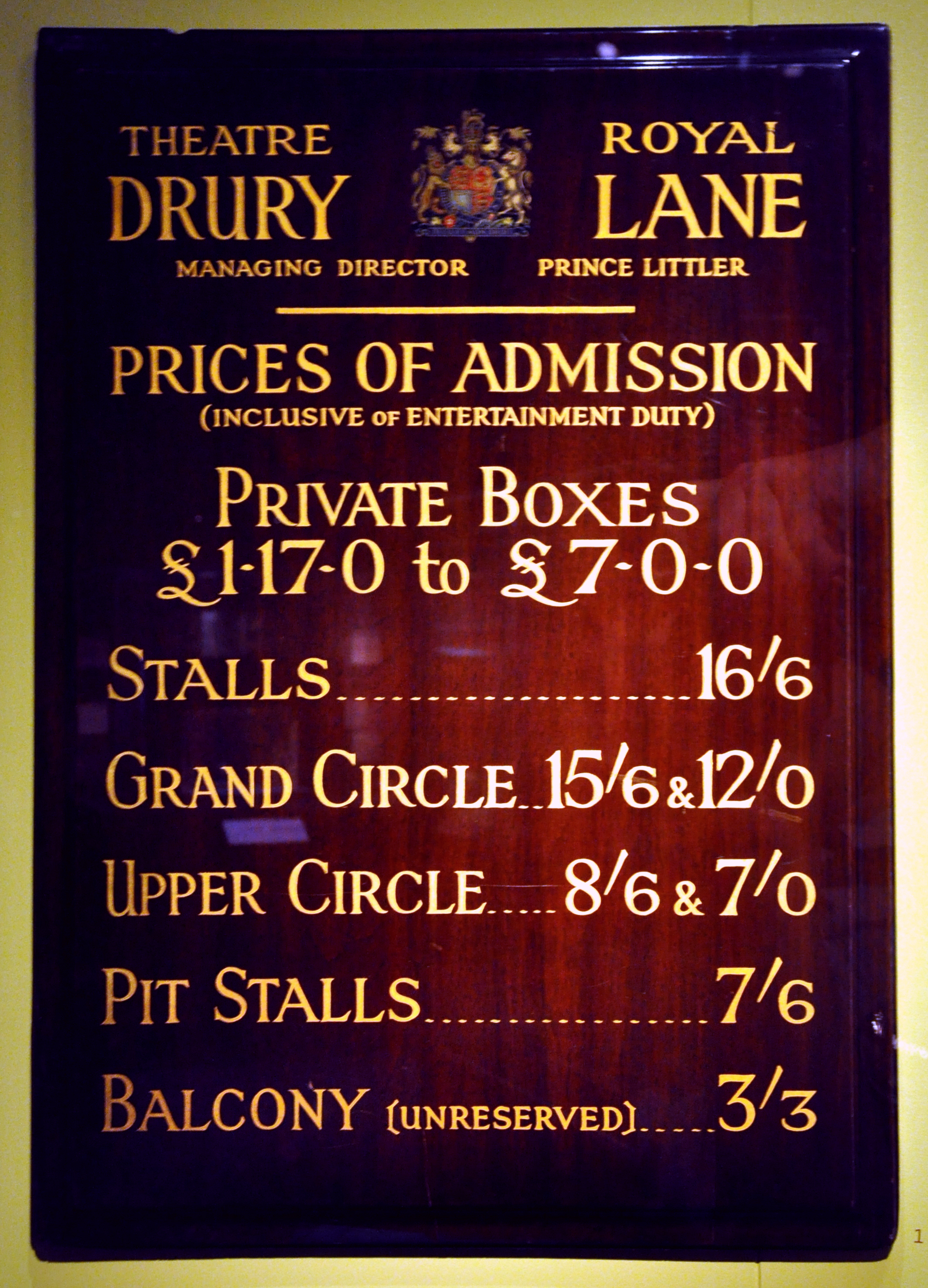
Entry prices for Theatre Royal, Drury Lane, c. 1946

In the UK, there were several ways to represent amounts of money in writing and speech, with no formal convention. Symbols for shilling and pence were optionally followed by a full stop. For example:

- 1/2d ('half penny'): pronounced (with the ⟨lf⟩ in half usually silent) as "hayp'ny" /ˈheɪpni/ or "haypence" /ˈheɪpəns/, and hence the occasional spellings ha'penny and ha'pence.
- 1 1/2d ('one-and-a-half pennies'): pronounced as "penny halfpenny" or "three halfpence".
- 2d ('two pence'): pronounced as "tuppence".
- 3d ('three pence'): pronounced as "thruppence" /ˈθrʌpəns/, "threppence" /ˈθrɛpəns/, or "throopence" /ˈθrʊpəns/; the coin was commonly referred to as a "threepenny bit".
- 6d ('six pence'): pronounced as "sixpence", "tanner" or "half a shilling".
- 11d ('eleven pence'): pronounced as "elevenpence".
- 1/– ('one shilling'): pronounced colloquially as "bob" in both singular and plural form. The slash sign ⟨/⟩ is used as separator; ⟨–⟩ is used in place of ⟨0⟩ meaning 'zero pence'.
- 2/– ('two shillings'): pronounced as "two shillings" or "one florin", or colloquially as "two-bob bit" or just "two bob".
- 2/6 ('two shillings and six pence'): usually said as "two and six" or "a half-crown"; the value could also be spoken as "half a crown", but the coin was always a "half-crown".
- 4/3 ('four shillings and three pence'): pronounced as "four and three pence" or "four-and-three".
- 5/– ('five shillings'): pronounced as "five bob", "a crown", or "a dollar".
- £1/1/– ('one pound and one shilling'): a former coin called "one guinea". Historically a unit used for payment of legal dispute settlements, but currently still the wager on the winner of a horse race.
- £1/10/– ('one pound and ten shillings'): pronounced as "one pound, ten shillings", "one pound ten", or "thirty bob".
- £3 17s. 10 1/2d. ('three pounds, seventeen shillings and ten-and-a-half pence'): pronounced as "three pounds, seventeen, and tenpence-ha'penny".
- £2/3/6 ('two pounds, three shillings and six pence'): pronounced (unless there was cause to be punctilious) as "two pound, three and six" or "two pounds, three and six". Whether pound or pounds was used depended upon the speaker, varying with class, region and context.
- £1/19/11 3/4 ('one pound, nineteen shillings and eleven-and-three-quarters pence'): pronounced as "one pound, nineteen shillings and elevenpence three farthings" – a psychological price, one farthing ('quarter of a penny') under £2.

Halfpennies and farthings were represented by the appropriate symbol (1/4 for farthing, 1/2 for halfpenny, or 3/4 for three farthings) after the whole pence. (Note: The style 1/2 was rare due to the risk of confusion between the fraction slash and a / used to divide shillings from pence. The decimal form 0.5 was never used.) British typewriters had these precomposed characters ¼, ½, and ¾ as standard, equivalent to today's Unicode characters U+00BC ¼ VULGAR FRACTION ONE QUARTER, U+00BD ½ VULGAR FRACTION ONE HALF, and U+00BE ¾ VULGAR FRACTION THREE QUARTERS respectively.

A convention frequently used in retail pricing was to list prices over one pound all in shillings, rather than in pounds and shillings; for example, £4/18/0 would be written as 98/–. This is still seen in shilling categories of Scottish beer, such as 90/– beer.

Sometimes, prices of luxury goods and furniture were expressed by merchants in guineas, although the guinea coin had not been struck since 1799. A guinea was 21 shillings (now £1.05). Professionals such as lawyers and physicians, art dealers, and some others stated their fees in guineas rather than pounds, while, for example, salaries were stated in pounds per annum. Historically, at some auctions, the purchaser would bid and pay in guineas but the seller would receive that same number of pounds; that is, the commission was that same number of shillings. Tattersalls, the main auctioneer of racehorses in the United Kingdom and Ireland, continues this tradition of conducting auctions in guineas at its UK sales (in Ireland, auctions are conducted in euros). The vendor's commission is 5%. The word guineas is still found in the names of some British horse races, even though their prize funds are now fixed in pounds – such as the 1,000 Guineas and 2,000 Guineas at Newmarket Racecourse.

== Colloquial terms ==
Coin	Pronounced	Slang (UK)	Slang (other)	Notes
Farthing and ha'penny bit (value: quarter penny and half a penny)	ˈfɑːðɪŋ, /ˈheɪpni/	"Mag" (slang for "chattering")		UK: Originally made from copper and made a ringing noise when dropped. The game of "penny pitching" (bouncing pennies against a wall to see how far they would rebound on to the pavement) was called "mag flying".
Threepenny bit (value: three pence)	Thrupney bit or threpney bit	Joey (also see Fourpence)	Australia: trey (also spelt tray), or a trey bit, from the French trois meaning 'three'. South Africa and Southern Rhodesia: tickey.	UK: When the new threepence coin replaced the fourpence coin in circulation in 1845, it took over its nickname. The coin was silver or silver alloy from 1845 to 1937 and a 12-sided bronze coin from 1937 to 1971.
Fourpenny bit (value: four pence)	ˈfɔːp(ə)ni	Joey		UK: Also known as "groat", from the mediaeval four-penny silver coin of the same name. "Joey" was from the first name of Joseph Hume, the Radical Member of Parliament who championed its reintroduction.
Sixpenny bit (value: six pence)	ˈsɪksp(ə)ns	Tanner, tester, testoon, sprasi (pronounced "sprarzee")	Australia: zack (also spell zac)	UK: "Tanner" was derived from the Romany word tano, meaning "small", because it was smaller than a shilling. Tester and testoon derived from the French coin teston. Sprasi, described by Bernard Levin, is unknown.
Shilling	ˈʃɪlɪŋ	Bob or "thin 'un"	Australia: bob, deener	UK: "Thin 'un" because it was thinner than a sovereign coin. Australia: "deener" is likely to have derived from the Latin "dinar" or "denarius".
Two-shilling piece, florin		Two bob, two-shilling bit, two-bob bit	Australia: two bob	UK: Perhaps an early attempt at decimalisation, being £ 1/10).
Half a crown or half crown (value: two shillings and sixpence)				An equivalent coin was not issued in the 1971 decimal currency range since there was no need for a 12 1/2 New Pence coin. Australia never had a half crown coin.
Crown or five-shilling piece (value: five shillings)		Dollar		
Ten-shilling note		Ten bob (note), half a bar	Australia: ten bob	UK: First printed in 1914 by the Treasury during World War I to conserve silver. These early Treasury notes (especially the 1st and 2nd Series from 1914 to 1917) were nicknamed "Bradburys", from the prominent stylised signature of Sir John Bradbury, Permanent Secretary to the Treasury.
Pound		Both coins and notes: quid, nicker. Coins: "sov", "thick 'un". Notes: bar, sheet, note.	Australia: quid, fiddly-did	"Quid" may have originated in the Latin phrase quid pro quo. UK: "Thick 'un" because it was thicker than a shilling. Australia: Fiddly-did was derived from word association (fiddly → fid → quid).

== In popular culture ==
The currency of Knuts, Sickles and Galleons in the Harry Potter books is a parody of the £sd system, with 29 Knuts to a Sickle and 17 Sickles to a Galleon. It serves as the currency of the Wizarding World, while pounds are still used by Muggles, the non-magical people.

Lysergic acid diethylamide was sometimes called "pounds, shillings and pence" during the 1960s, because of the abbreviation LSD. The English rock group the Pretty Things released a 1966 single titled "£.s.d." that highlighted the double entendre. The Chemical Defence Experimental Establishment called the first field trial with LSD as a chemical weapon moneybags as a pun.

A 26 score is also referred to as breakfast, since 2/6 ('half a crown') was the standard cost for breakfast pre-decimalisation.

== See also ==
- Coins of the pound sterling – British current and historic coinage
- Irish pound – Currency of Ireland before 2002
- Decimal time – Time of day using decimal units
- LSD (disambiguation)
