= R$ =

R$ may refer to:

- Brazilian real, the official and current currency of Brazil
- Rhodesian dollar, the former currency of Rhodesia
- Robux, the currency on the video game site in Roblox
