= Connecticut pound =

Currency of Connecticut until 1793

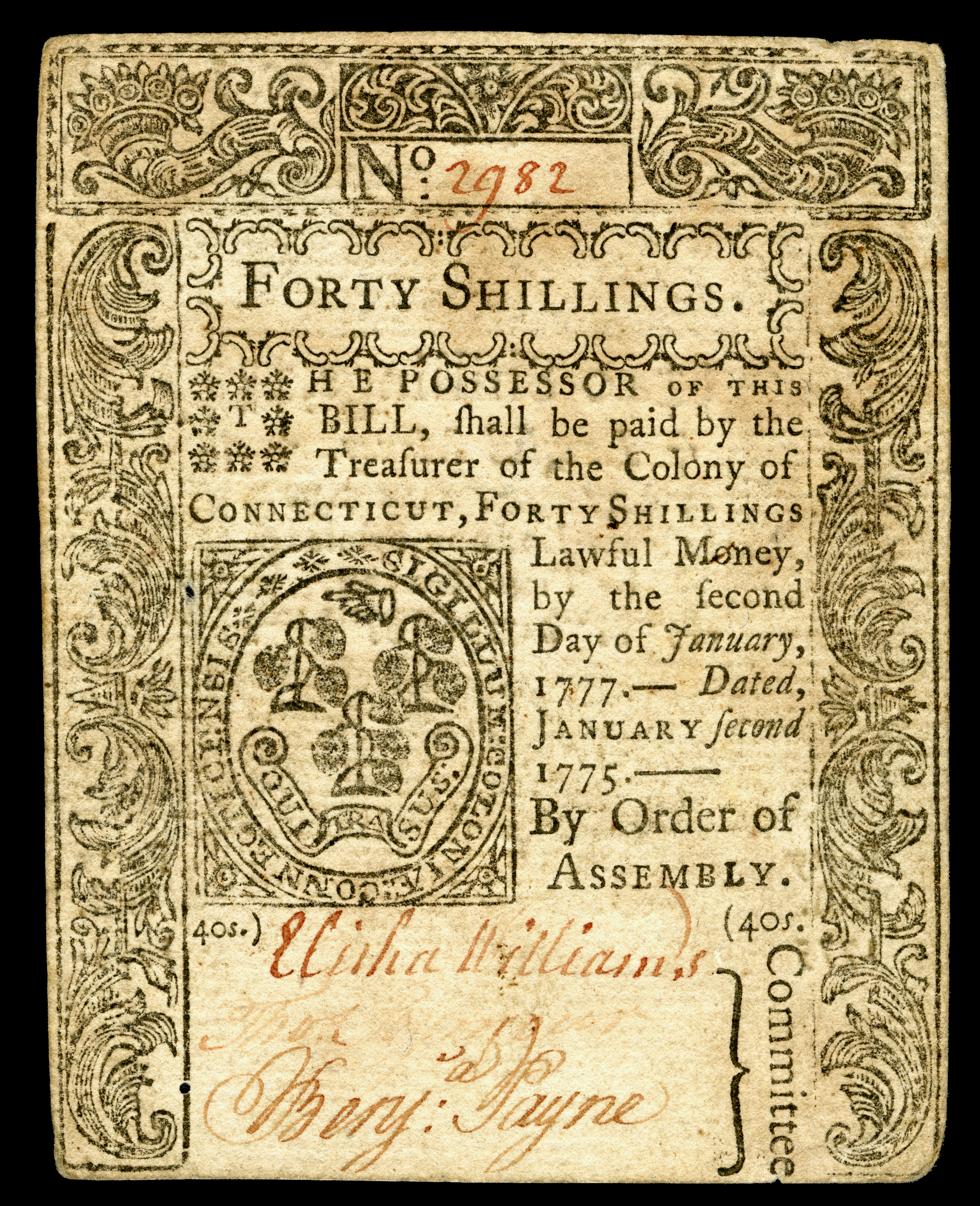
A 40 shilling note, dated 1775

The pound was the currency of Connecticut until 1793. Initially, sterling coin circulated along with foreign currencies. This was supplemented by local paper money from 1709. Although the local currency was denominated in £sd, it was worth less than sterling, with 1 Connecticut shilling = 9 pence sterling. This rated the Spanish dollar at 6 Connecticut shillings (compared to 4 shillings 6 pence sterling). The first issue of notes is known as the "Old Tenor" issue.

Due to over issue, the value of the Old Tenor notes fell relative to silver coins. In 1740, a second series of paper money was introduced, known as the "New Tenor" issue. These were worth 3½ times as much as the same denomination of Old Tenor notes. A further issue of 1755, known as "Lawful Money", replaced the Old and New Tenor issues at the rates of 1 Lawful Money shilling = 2.1 New Tenor shillings = 7.33 Old Tenor shillings.

The State of Connecticut issued Continental currency denominated in both £sd and Spanish dollars, with 1 Spanish dollar = 6 shillings. The Continental currency was replaced by the U.S. dollar at the rate of 1000 Continental dollars = 1 U.S. dollar.
