= Delaware pound =

Currency of Delaware until 1793

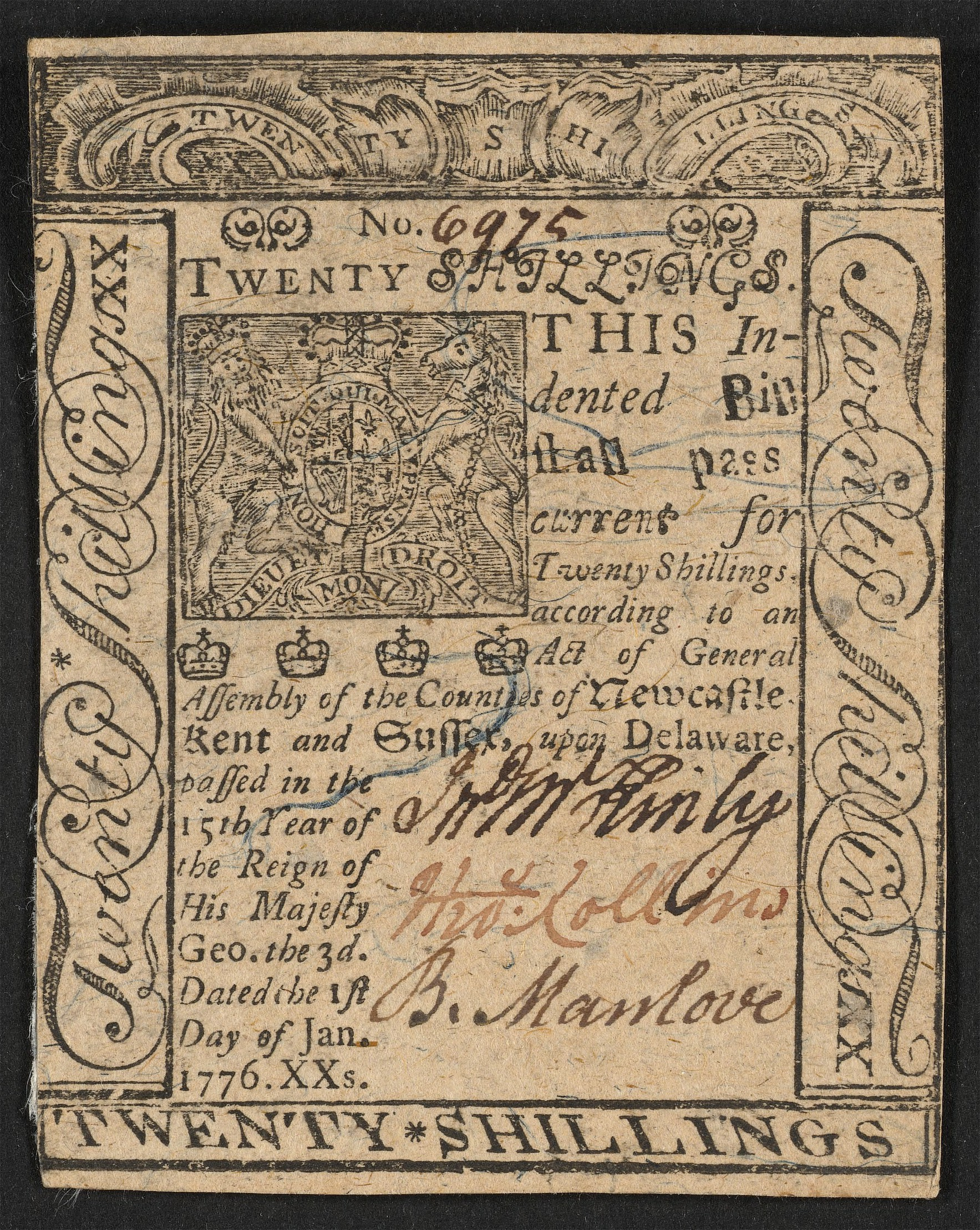
A twenty-shilling Delaware banknote issued in 1776.

The pound was the currency of Delaware until 1793. Initially, sterling coin circulated along with foreign currencies. This was supplemented by local paper money from 1723. Although the local currency was denominated in £sd, it was worth less than sterling, with 1 Delaware shilling = 9 pence sterling.

The State of Delaware issued Continental currency denominated in £sd and Spanish dollars, with the dollar equal to 7 shillings and 6 pence. The Continental currency was replaced by the U.S. dollar at the rate of 1000 continental dollars = 1 U.S. dollar.
