= Rhodesia and Nyasaland pound =

Currency of the Federation of Rhodesia and Nyasaland

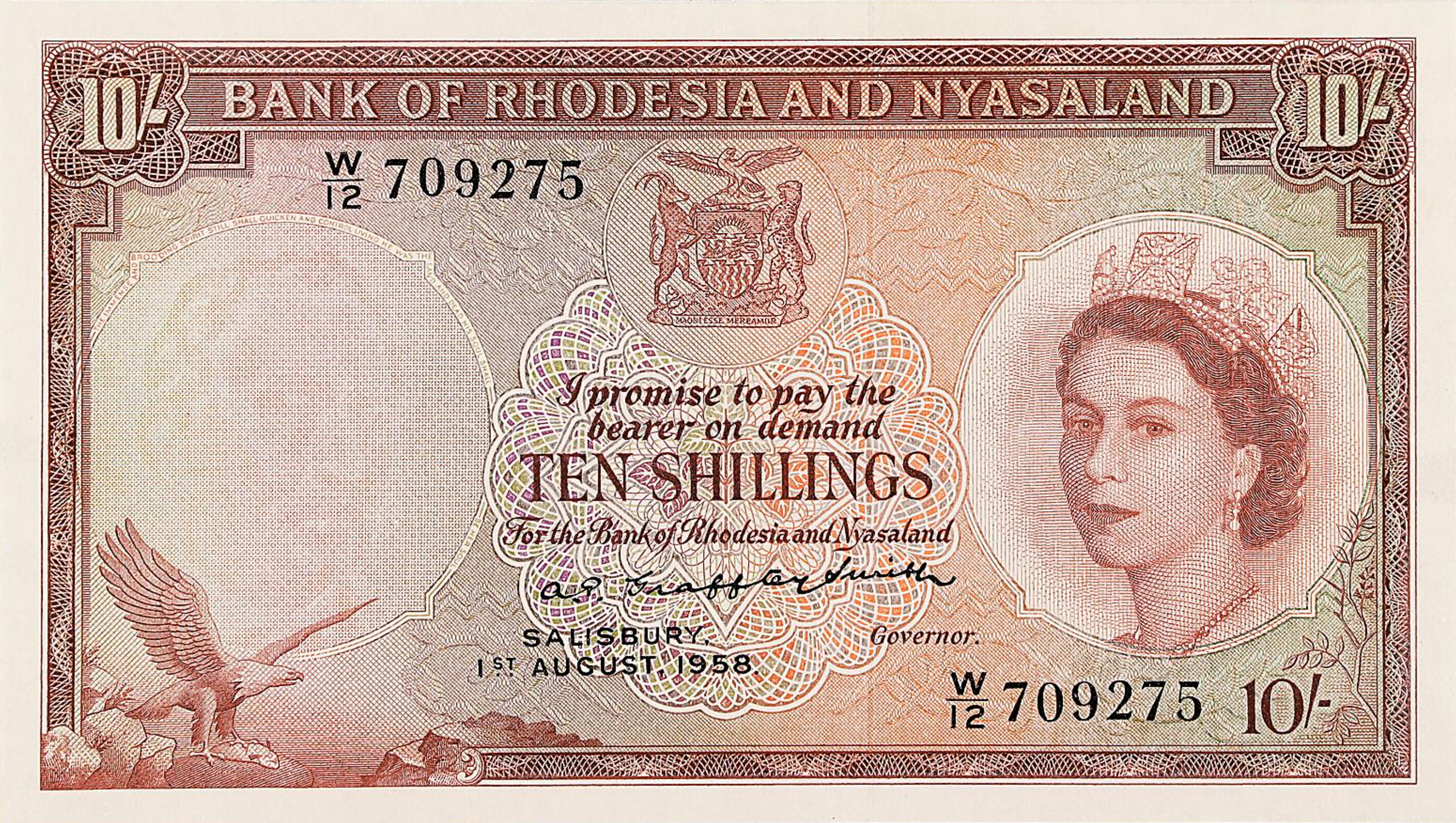
- 10/– note

Units of account
- Base unit: pound
- Plural: pounds
- Symbol: £
- Subunit
- 1/20: shilling
- 1/240: penny
- Plural
- penny: pence
- Symbol
- shilling: s or /–
- penny: d

Denominations
- Banknotes: 10/–, £1, £5, £10
- Coins: 1/2d, 1d, 3d, 6d, 1/–, 2/–, 2/6

Demographics
- User(s): Rhodesia and Nyasaland

Issuance
- Central bank: Central African Currency Board (1953–1956); Reserve Bank of Rhodesia (1956–1964)

Valuation
- Pegged with: sterling at par
- This infobox shows the latest status before this currency was rendered obsolete.

The pound was the currency of the Federation of Rhodesia and Nyasaland. It was subdivided into 20 shillings, each of 12 pence.

== History ==
The Federation was formed in 1953, and the new currency was created in 1955 to replace the Southern Rhodesian pound which had been circulating in all parts of the federation (Southern Rhodesia, Northern Rhodesia, and Nyasaland). The Rhodesia and Nyasaland pound replaced the Southern Rhodesian pound at par and was pegged at par to sterling.

The Federation broke up at the end of 1963 and the three territories reverted to being separate British colonies. In the second half of 1964, Nyasaland became independent as Malawi, Northern Rhodesia became independent as Zambia, and Southern Rhodesia declared a name change to Rhodesia. Each issued their own pounds, at par with the Rhodesia and Nyasaland pound. See Malawian pound, Zambian pound and Rhodesian pound.

== Coins ==
The Federation also issued its own coinage. In 1955 a full new set of coins were issued with the Mary Gillick obverse of the Queen and various African animals on the reverse. The denominations followed those of sterling, namely halfpennies and pennies, which had a hole in them, threepences (known as tickeys), sixpences, shillings, a two shilling piece and a half crown. There were further full issues of all these coins in 1956 and 1957, but thereafter only pennies and half pennies were produced until some further issues of sixpences in 1962 and 1963, and threepences in 1963 and 1964. The higher denomination coins, though not particularly rare, are very popular with collectors because of their attractive reverse designs. Threepences and halfpennies were struck in 1964 despite the fact the Federation ended on 31 December 1963.

Standard Coinage
Image	Value	Technical parameters				Description			Date of	
Image	Value	Diameter	Thickness	Mass	Composition	Edge	Obverse	Reverse	first minting	last minting
	1/2 penny	21 mm		3.0 g	Bronze	Smooth	Hole in center flanked by giraffes with crown above	Value around hole in center flanked by sprigs	1955	1964
	1 penny	27 mm		6.30 g	Bronze	Smooth	Hole in center flanked by elephants with crown above	Value around hole in center flanked by sprigs	1955	1963
	3 pence	16.3 mm		1.4 g	Copper-nickel	Reeded	Elizabeth II bust right	Flame lily divides date	1955	1964
	6 pence	19.4 mm		2.8 g	Copper-nickel	Reeded	Elizabeth II bust right	Lion standing on rock	1955	1963
	1 shilling	23.6 mm		5.7 g	Copper-nickel	Reeded	Elizabeth II bust right	Sable antelope	1955	1957
	2 shillings	28.4 mm		11.2 g	Copper-nickel	Reeded	Elizabeth II bust right	Eagle with talons in fish flanked by initials	1955	1957
	1/2 crown	32.3 mm		14.2 g	Copper-nickel	Reeded	Elizabeth II bust right	Coat of arms of Rhodesia and Nyasaland	1955	1957

== Banknotes ==
From 1956 to 1961, the Bank of Rhodesia and Nyasaland issued notes for 10/–, £1, £5 and £10.

Banknotes of the Rhodesia & Nyasaland Pound 1956–1964
Pick No.	Image		Value	Dimensions	Main colour	Description			Date of		
Pick No.	Obverse	Reverse	Value	Dimensions	Main colour	Obverse	Reverse	Watermark	printing	issue	withdrawal
20			10/–	132 × 75 mm	Brown	African fish eagle and Queen Elizabeth II	Lake Nyasa	Cecil John Rhodes	1956–1964	3 April 1956	
21			£1	148 × 82 mm	Green	Leopard and Queen Elizabeth II	Great Zimbabwe	Cecil John Rhodes	1956–1964	3 April 1956	
22			£5	160 × 88 mm	Blue	Sable antelope and Queen Elizabeth II	Victoria Falls	Cecil John Rhodes	1956–1964	3 April 1956	
23			£10	168 × 94 mm	Orange	Lion and Queen Elizabeth II	Elephants	Cecil John Rhodes	1956–1964	3 April 1956	

Preceded by: Southern Rhodesian pound Reason: creation of federation Ratio: at par	Currency of Rhodesia and Nyasaland; 1956 – 1964	Succeeded by: Malawian pound Location: Malawi (formerly Nyasaland); Reason: independence Ratio: at par
Preceded by: Southern Rhodesian pound Reason: creation of federation Ratio: at par	Currency of Rhodesia and Nyasaland; 1956 – 1964	Succeeded by: Rhodesian pound Location: Rhodesia (formerly Southern Rhodesia); Reason: federation break-up Ratio: at par
Preceded by: Southern Rhodesian pound Reason: creation of federation Ratio: at par	Currency of Rhodesia and Nyasaland; 1956 – 1964	Succeeded by: Zambian pound Location: Zambia (formerly Northern Rhodesia); Reason: independence Ratio: at par
