= Malawian kwacha =

Currency of Malawi

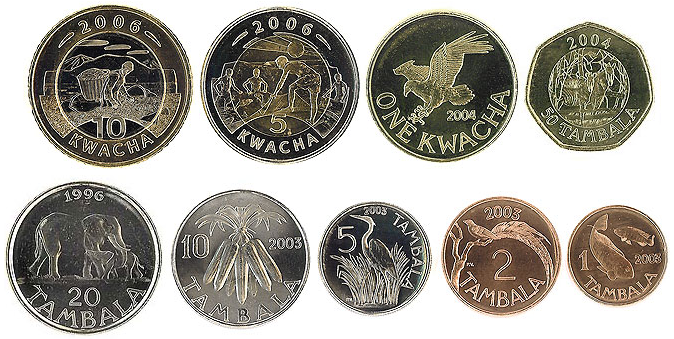
Old coins of the Malawian kwacha.
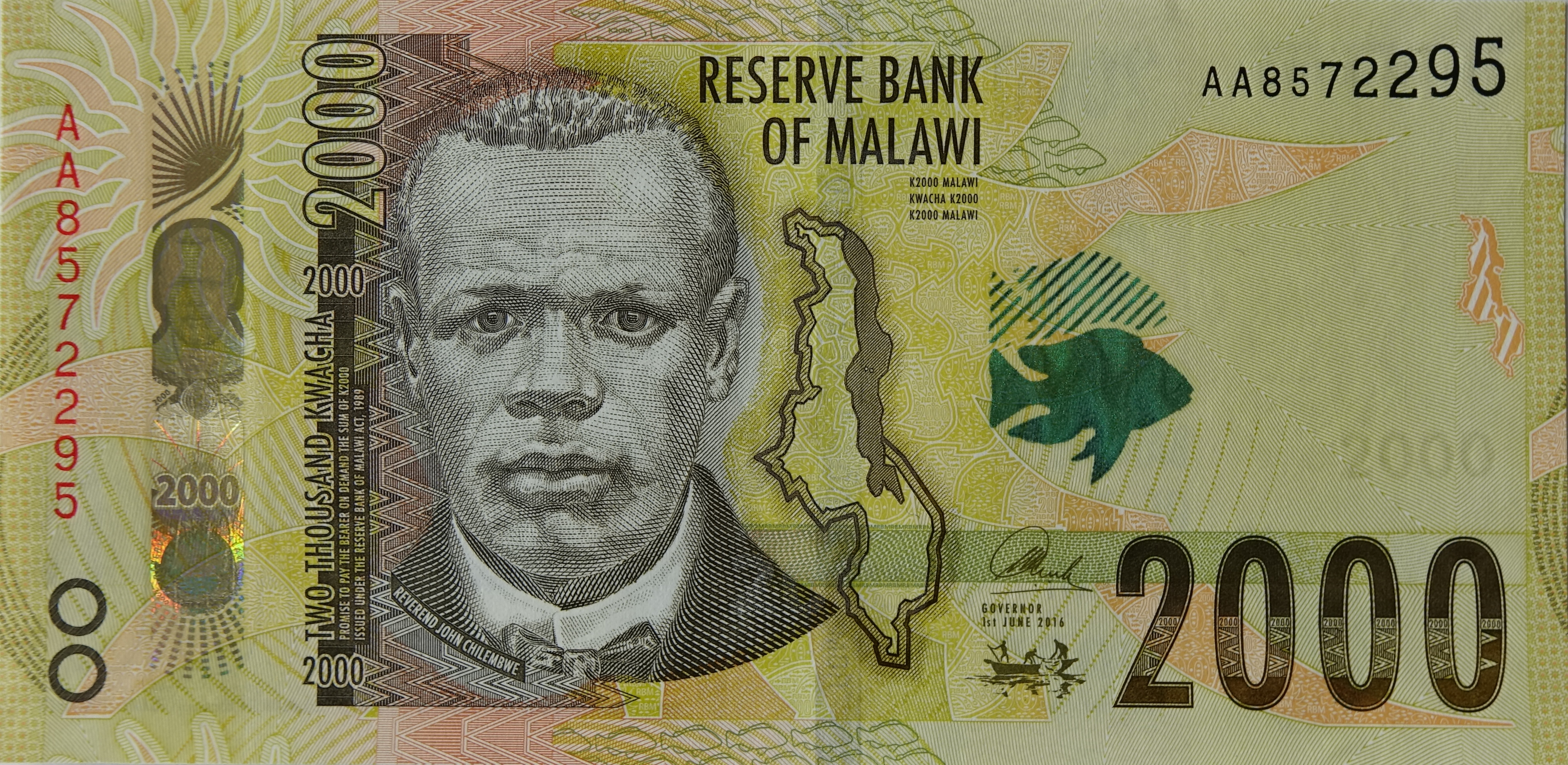
current k2000 banknote

ISO 4217
- Code: MWK (numeric: 454)
- Subunit: 0.01

Units of account
- Symbol: K
- Subunit
- 1/100: tambala

Denominations
- Banknotes
- Freq. used: 100, 200, 500, 1,000, 2,000, 5,000 kwacha
- Rarely used: 20, 50 kwacha
- Coins
- Freq. used: 10, 20, 50 kwacha
- Rarely used: 1, 2, 5, 10, 20, 50 tambala, 1, 5 kwacha

Demographics
- Date of introduction: 1971
- Replaced: Malawian pound
- User(s): Malawi

Issuance
- Central bank: Reserve Bank of Malawi
- Website: www.rbm.mw

Valuation
- Inflation: 19.90%
- Source: Rbm Nov 2016

The kwacha (/ˈkwætʃə/; ISO 4217: MWK, official name Malawi Kwacha) is the currency of Malawi as of 1971, replacing the Malawian pound. It is divided into 100 tambala. The kwacha replaced other types of currency, namely the British pound sterling, the South African rand, and the Rhodesian dollar, that had previously circulated through the Malawian economy. The exchange rate of the kwacha undergoes fixed periodical adjustments, but since 1994 the exchange rate has floated. In 2005, administrative measures were put in place by Bingu wa Mutharika to peg the exchange rate with other currencies. Banknotes are issued by the Reserve Bank of Malawi. In May 2012, the Reserve Bank of Malawi devalued the kwacha by 34% and unpegged it from the United States dollar. The currency was further devalued by 25% by the central bank in May 2022 followed by another 44% devaluation in November 2023 raising inflation rate in Malawi.

== Etymology ==
The name kwacha was first used in Zambia, where the Zambian kwacha was introduced in 1968. It derives from the Chinyanja or Chichewa word meaning "it has dawned", while tambala translates as "rooster (cock)" in Chichewa. The tambala was so named because "a hundred roosters announce the dawn."

== History ==
The kwacha replaced the Malawian pound on 15 February 1971 (on the same day the United Kingdom decimalised) at a rate of two kwacha to one pound. Malawi followed the pattern of South Africa, Australia, and New Zealand in that when it adopted the decimal system, it decided to use the half pound unit as opposed to the pound unit of account.

As of 30 August 2019, one British pound sterling was equal to approximately 883.43 kwachas, one US dollar was equal to 725.16 kwachas and one South African rand was equal to 47.69 kwachas. As of 30 August 2019 one Euro is equivalent to 797.42 Kwachas.

As of 11 November 2025, one British pound sterling was equal to approximately 2349 kwachas, one US dollar was equal to 1734 kwachas, one South African rand was equal to 104 kwachas and one Euro was equivalent to 2063 Kwachas. However, in the street, US dollars can bring a black market rate of 4300 kwachas.

== Coins ==
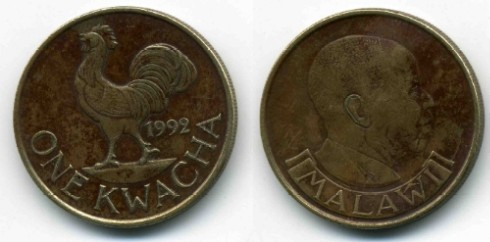
A one kwacha coin from 1992

The first coins introduced in 1971 were in denominations of 1, 2, 5, 10 and 20 tambala. In 1986, 50 tambala and 1 kwacha coins were also introduced. In January 2007, 5 and 10 kwacha coins, which actually bear a mint date of 2006, were also released into circulation. On 23 May 2012 new 1, 5 and 10 kwacha coins were released into circulation

The 1 and 2 tambala coins are composed of copper-plated steel. The 5 tambala coin is of nickel-plated steel. The 50 tambala and 1 kwacha coin are composed of brass-plated steel.

Due to inflation, coins below 10 kwacha are very rarely used because of their minimal value.

== Banknotes ==
Old Malawian 1 kwacha note, carrying the date 1 Dec 1990, depicting former President-for-Life Hastings Banda on the front and workers in a Tobacco field on the reverse.

In 1971, banknotes dated 1964 were introduced in denominations of 50 tambala, 1, 2 and 10 kwacha. 5 kwacha notes were introduced in 1973 when the 2 kwacha note was discontinued. 20 kwacha notes were introduced in 1983. 50 tambala notes were last issued in 1986, with the last 1 kwacha notes printed in 1992. In 1993, 50 kwacha notes were introduced, followed by 100 kwacha in 1993, 200 kwacha in 1995, 500 kwacha in 2001 and 2000 kwacha in November 2016 to ease desperate cash shortages.

As of 2008, the following banknote denominations are in circulation:

1997 Series
Image	Value	Dimensions	Main Colour	Description		Date of first printing
Image	Value	Dimensions	Main Colour	Obverse	Reverse	Date of first printing
	K5	126 × 63 mm	Green	John Chilembwe	Villagers mashing grain	1 July 1997
	K10	132 × 66 mm	Brown	John Chilembwe	Children in "bush" school	1 July 1997
	K20	138 × 69 mm	Purple	John Chilembwe	Workers harvesting tea leaves	1 July 1997
	K50	144 × 72 mm	Blue	John Chilembwe	Independence Arch in Blantyre	1 July 1997
	K100	150 × 75 mm	Red	John Chilembwe	Capital Hill in Lilongwe	1 July 1997
	K200	156 × 78 mm	Blue	John Chilembwe	Reserve Bank building in Lilongwe	1 July 1997
	K500	162 × 81 mm	Multi-colour	John Chilembwe	Reserve Bank building in Blantyre	1 December 2001

According to an article in the Nyasa Times dated 9 March 2012, within the next six months the Reserve Bank of Malawi would introduce a whole new series of notes, including a 1,000-kwacha note, twice the largest denomination currently in circulation. The notes were announced in Biantyre on 8 March by Governor Dr. Perks Ligoya. The new notes would be much smaller in size than the current notes, which served as a cost-cutting measure. The new 1,000-kwacha note was going to be printed by De La Rue.

On 23 May 2012, the Nyasa Times reported that the Reserve Bank of Malawi introduced the new 1,000 kwacha note into circulation along with the proposed new notes. The new 1,000 kwacha note was valued at around US$4. The new kwacha had the face of the first president Kamuzu Banda on the front and the back carries a depiction of Mzuzu maize silos.

The new 20 kwacha note was found to contain an error. On the back of the note is a building identified as the Domasi Teacher's Training College (now known as the Domasi College of Education). However, it is reported that the building is, in fact, the Machinga Teacher's Training College.

The Reserve Bank of Malawi is going to revise its new family of notes so that they are more "blind friendly". According to the Malawi Union of the Blind, the current notes have raised dots to aid in recognition of the denominations, but the dots are too small to be useful.

2012 Series
Image		Value	Dimensions	Main Colour	Description		Date of first printing
Obverse	Reverse	Value	Dimensions	Main Colour	Obverse	Reverse	Date of first printing
		K20	128 × 64 mm	Purple	Reserve Bank of Malawi headquarters in Lilongwe; Inkosi ya Makhosi M’mbelwa II (Lazalo Mkhuzo Jere)	Machinga Teachers Training College building and tree; stack of books and mortarboard	23 May 2012
		K50	128 × 64 mm	Light blue and green	Reserve Bank of Malawi headquarters building in Lilongwe; Inkosi Ya Makhosi Gomani II (Philip Zitonga Maseko)	Elephants, tree, and safari vehicle in Kasungu National Park	23 May 2012
		K100	128 × 64 mm	Red	Reserve Bank of Malawi headquarters building in Lilongwe; James Frederick Sangala	College of Medicine in Blantyre; stethoscope	23 May 2012
		K200	132 × 66 mm	Blue and violet	Reserve Bank of Malawi headquarters building in Lilongwe; Rose Lomathinda Chibambo	New Parliament building in Lilongwe	23 May 2012
		K500	132 × 66 mm	Brown and orange	Reserve Bank of Malawi headquarters building in Lilongwe; Reverend John Chilembwe	Mulunguzi dam in Zomba; water spigot; silhouette of woman carrying container on head and man carrying hoe over shoulder	23 May 2012
		K1000	132 × 66 mm	Green	Reserve Bank of Malawi headquarters building in Lilongwe; Dr. Hastings Kamuzu Banda	Mzuzu maize silos; stalk of maize (corn); silhouette of two people mashing maize	23 May 2012
		K2000		Yellow	Reverend John Chilembwe; outline of Malawi	Malawi University of Science and Technology, Thyolo District	1 June 2016

2022 Series
Image	Value	Dimensions	Main Colour	Description		Date of first issue
Image	Value	Dimensions	Main Colour	Obverse	Reverse	Date of first issue
	K2000	135 × 66 mm	Orange	Reverend John Chilembwe; outline of Malawi	Blantyre Magistrate Court	24 February 2022
	K5000		Purple	Dr. Hastings Kamuzu Banda; outline of Malawi	Reserve Bank of Malawi Mzuzu branch	24 February 2022

Current MWK exchange rates
From Google Finance:	AUD CAD CHF CNY EUR GBP HKD JPY USD ZAR EUR JPY
From Yahoo! Finance:	AUD CAD CHF CNY EUR GBP HKD JPY USD ZAR EUR JPY
From XE.com:	AUD CAD CHF CNY EUR GBP HKD JPY USD ZAR EUR JPY
From OANDA:	AUD CAD CHF CNY EUR GBP HKD JPY USD ZAR EUR JPY

== See also ==
- Economy of Malawi
- Zambian kwacha

Preceded by: Malawian pound Ratio: 2 kwacha = 1 pound	Currency of Malawi; 1971 –	Succeeded by: Current
