= Southern Rhodesian pound =

Currency of Southern Rhodesia from 1940 to 1956

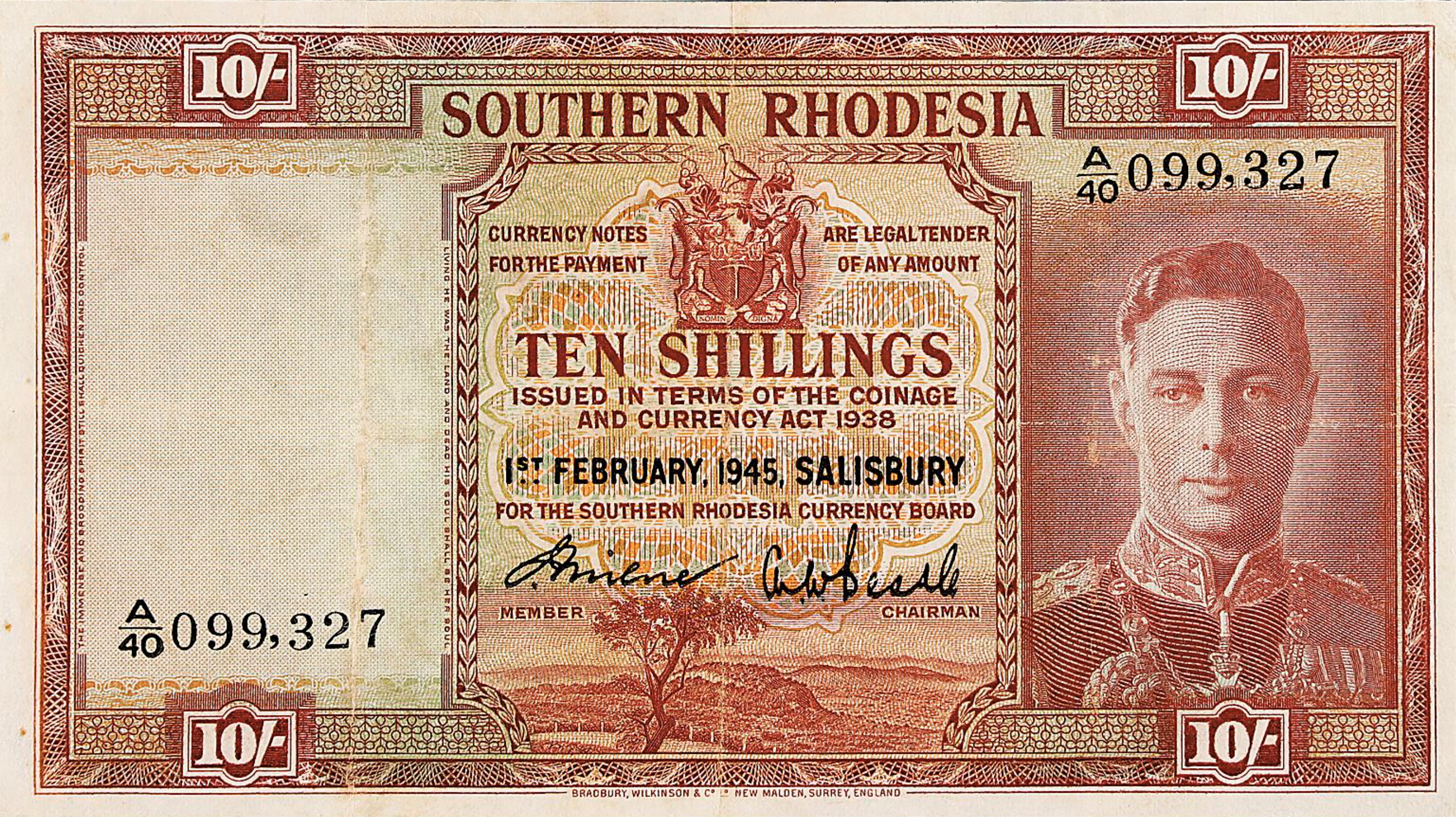
- 10/– banknote from 1945

Units of account
- Base unit: pound
- Plural: pounds
- Symbol: £
- Subunit
- 1/20: shilling
- 1/240: penny
- Plural
- penny: pence
- Symbol
- shilling: s or /–
- penny: d

Denominations
- Banknotes: 5/–, 10/–, £1, £5, £10
- Coins: 1/2d, 1d, 3d, 6d, 1/–, 2/–, 2/6

Demographics
- User(s): Southern Rhodesia

Issuance
- Central bank: Southern Rhodesia Currency Board (1938–1953); Central African Currency Board (1953–1956)

Valuation
- Pegged with: sterling at par
- This infobox shows the latest status before this currency was rendered obsolete.

The pound was the currency of Southern Rhodesia. It also circulated in Northern Rhodesia and Nyasaland. The pound was subdivided into 20 shillings, each of 12 pence.

== History ==
From 1896, private banks issued notes denominated in £sd equal to sterling. In 1932, a distinct coinage was introduced. In 1938, the Southern Rhodesia Currency Board was established and took over the issuance of paper money the following year. Southern Rhodesia, Northern Rhodesia and Nyasaland joined in 1953 to form the Federation of Rhodesia and Nyasaland, which continued to use the Southern Rhodesian pound until 1955 when coins were introduced for the Rhodesia and Nyasaland pound. 1955 also saw the Southern Rhodesia Currency Board renamed the Central African Currency Board. In 1956, the first paper money of the Rhodesia and Nyasaland pound was introduced, completing the transition.

== Coins ==
In 1932, .925 fineness silver coins were introduced in denominations of 3d, 6d, 1/–, 2/–, and 2/6. These were followed in 1934 by holed, cupro-nickel 1/2d and 1d coins. In 1942, bronze replaced cupro-nickel, whilst the silver coins were debased to .500 fineness in 1944 and replaced by cupro-nickel in 1947. Coins were issued until 1954. In 1953 a 5/– coin of .500 fineness (.45 ounce actual silver weight) was minted to commemorate the centennial of the birth of Cecil Rhodes. 124,000 were produced for circulation, plus 1500 minted as Proof coinage.

== Banknotes ==
In 1896, the Salisbury branch of the Standard Bank of South Africa introduced the first Southern Rhodesian banknotes, in denominations of £1 and £5. This bank later issued 10/– notes. The Bank of Africa, Barclays Bank and the National Bank of South Africa also issued notes. These private bank issues ended in 1938.

In 1939, the Southern Rhodesia Currency Board introduced 10/–, £1 and £5 notes, followed by 5/– notes between 1943 and 1948 and £10 in 1953. In 1955, the Central Africa Currency Board issued notes in denominations of 10/–, £1, £5 and £10.

Banknotes of the Southern Rhodesian Pound 1939–1952
Pick No.	Image		Value	Dimensions	Main colour	Description			Date of		
Pick No.	Obverse	Reverse	Value	Dimensions	Main colour	Obverse	Reverse	Watermark	printing	issue	withdrawal
8a			5/–		Brown	King George VI	5/-	None	1943–1945	1 January 1943	
8b			5/–	115 × 69 mm	Brown	King George VI	5/-	None	1945–1952	1 February 1945	
9			10/–		Brown	Eastern Highlands and King George VI	Victoria Falls	Cecil John Rhodes	1939–1952	15 December 1939	
10			£1		Green	King George VI	Great Zimbabwe	Cecil John Rhodes	1939–1952	15 December 1939	
11			£5		Blue	Mining and King George VI	Victoria Falls	Cecil John Rhodes	1939–1952	15 December 1939	

Banknotes of the Southern Rhodesian Pound 1952 - 1956
Pick No.	Image		Value	Dimensions	Main colour	Description			Date of		
Pick No.	Obverse	Reverse	Value	Dimensions	Main colour	Obverse	Reverse	Watermark	printing	issue	withdrawal
12			10/–	132 × 75 mm	Brown	Eastern Highlands and Queen Elizabeth II	Victoria Falls	Cecil John Rhodes	1952–1956	1 December 1952	
13			£1	148 × 82 mm	Green	Queen Elizabeth II	Great Zimbabwe	Cecil John Rhodes	1952–1956	1 December 1952	
14			£5	160 × 88 mm	Blue	Mining and Queen Elizabeth II	Victoria Falls	Cecil John Rhodes	1953–1956	1 January 1953	
15			£10	168 × 94 mm	Orange	Lion and Queen Elizabeth II	Elephants	Cecil John Rhodes	1953–1956	15 April 1953	

Preceded by: British pound Reason: creation of local currency Ratio: at par	Currency of Southern Rhodesia; 1940 – 1953	Currency of Rhodesia and Nyasaland; 1953 – 1956	Succeeded by: Rhodesia and Nyasaland pound Location: Rhodesia and Nyasaland; Reason: formation of federation Ratio: at par
Preceded by: British pound Reason: creation of local currency Ratio: at par	Circulates in Northern Rhodesia; 1940 – 1953	Currency of Rhodesia and Nyasaland; 1953 – 1956	Succeeded by: Rhodesia and Nyasaland pound Location: Rhodesia and Nyasaland; Reason: formation of federation Ratio: at par
Preceded by: British pound Reason: creation of local currency Ratio: at par	Circulates in Nyasaland; 1940 – 1953	Currency of Rhodesia and Nyasaland; 1953 – 1956	Succeeded by: Rhodesia and Nyasaland pound Location: Rhodesia and Nyasaland; Reason: formation of federation Ratio: at par
