= Georgia pound =

Historic currency of Georgia, United States

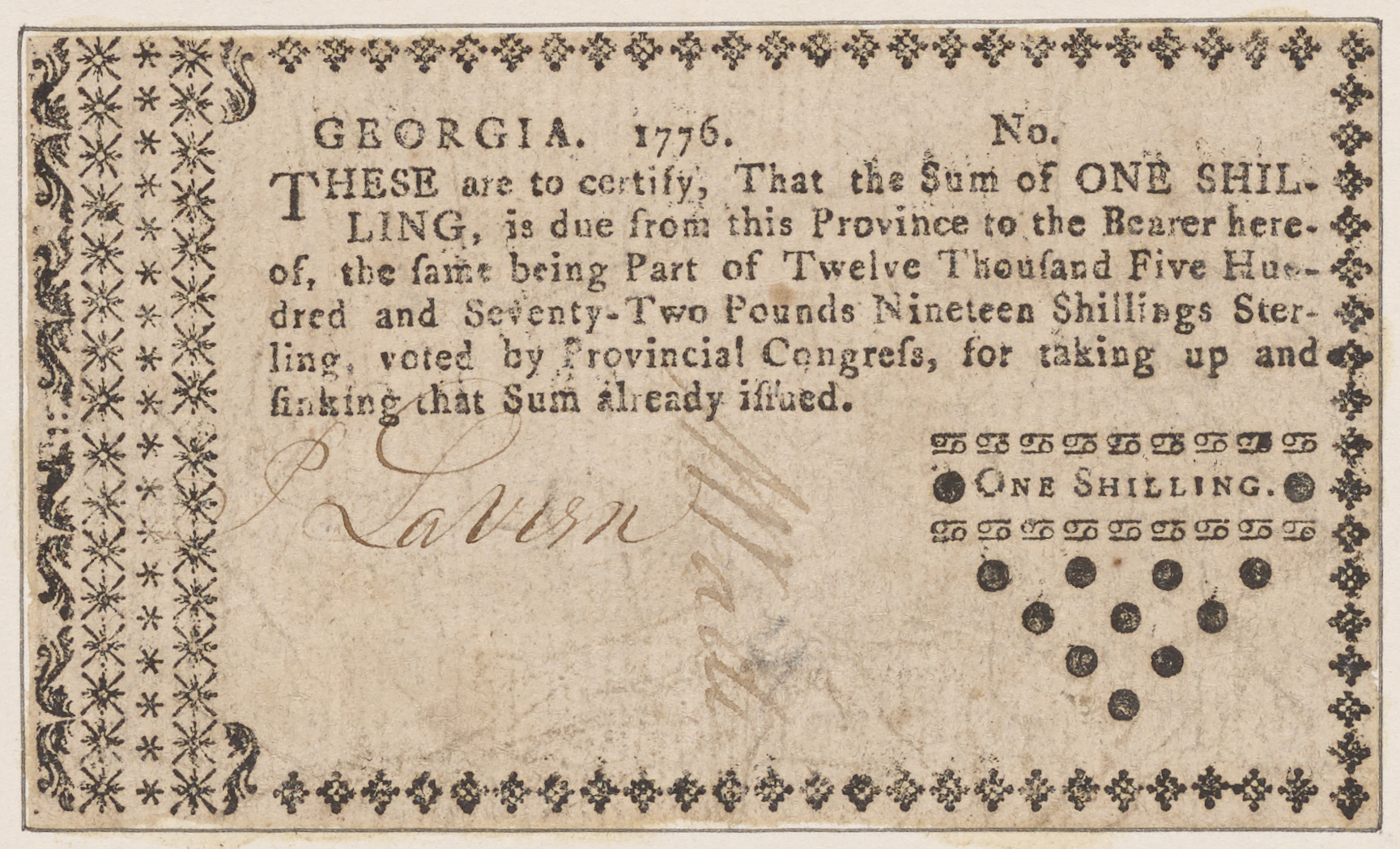
- Georgia one-shilling note (1776)

Units of account
- Subunit
- 1/20: shilling

Demographics
- Date of introduction: 1735
- Replaced by: U.S. dollar
- User(s): Georgia, United States
- This infobox shows the latest status before this currency was rendered obsolete.

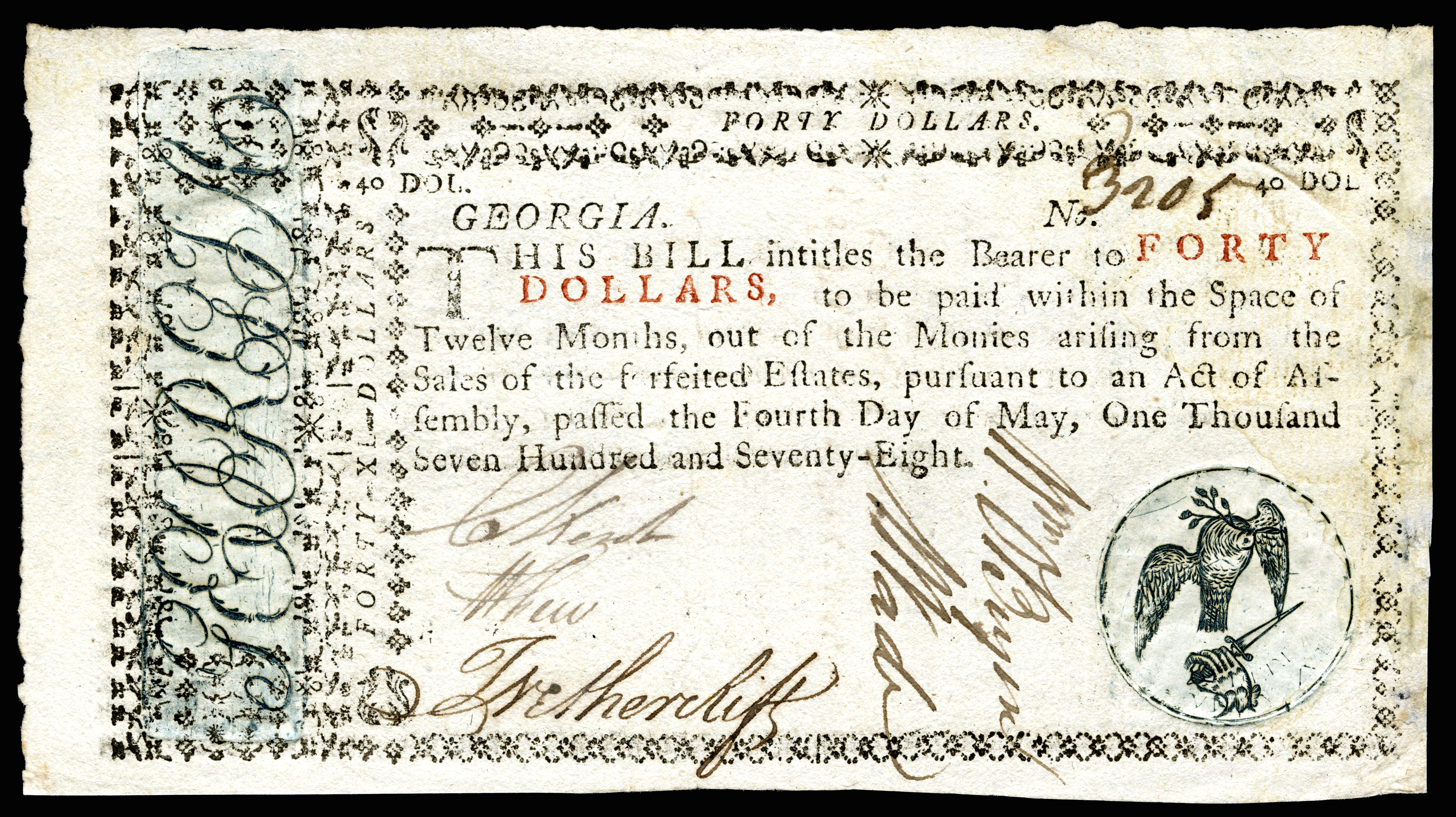
Bill of 1778 worth forty Spanish dollars, i.e. ten Georgia pounds.

The pound was the currency of Georgia until 1793. Initially, sterling coin circulated. This was supplemented from 1735 with local paper money denominated in £sd, with 1 pound = 20 shillings = 240 pence.

The State of Georgia issued Continental currency denominated in £sd and Spanish dollars, at 1 dollar = 5 shillings, i.e. £1 = $4. The continental currency was replaced by the U.S. dollar at the rate of 1000 continental dollars = 1 U.S. dollar.

== See also ==
- History of Georgia (U.S. state)
- Province of Georgia
