= New Guinean pound =

Unit
- Plural
- Symbol: £

Denominations
- Subunit
- 1/20: shilling
- 1/240: penny
- Plural
- penny: pence
- Symbol
- shilling: s or /–
- penny: d
- Coins: 1/2d, 1d, 3d, 6d, 1/–

Demographics
- User(s): Territory of New Guinea

Valuation
- Pegged with: Australian pound at par
- This infobox shows the latest status before this currency was rendered obsolete.

The pound was the currency of the Australian Territory of New Guinea between 1915 and 1966, and replaced the New Guinean mark when Australia occupied the former German colony at the end of World War I. The New Guinean pound was subdivided into 20 shillings, each of 12 pence, and was equal to the Australian pound.

No banknotes were ever issued; all denominations larger than one shilling were Australian currency.

The Australian pound currency circulated alongside coins issued specifically for New Guinea between 1929 and 1945. New Guinean coins ceased to be produced in 1945.

Between 1942 and 1945, the Oceanian pound circulated, issued by the Japanese occupiers. Australian coins and banknotes resumed circulation after the war and continued until the Papua New Guinean kina, which was introduced on 19 April 1975, replaced the Australian dollar at par. The Australian dollar continued to be legal tender in PNG until 1 January 1976 when it was withdrawn.

== Coins ==
In 1929, nickel halfpennies and pennies, as well as cupro-nickel pennies were introduced. These (as well as all subsequent New Guinean coins) were holed. The inscription on the reverse read: Georgius V. D G Rex et Ind. Imp., which translates from Latin as, "George the Fifth, by the Grace of God King and Emperor of India". The inscription on the obverse reads Territory of New Guinea. These coins are extremely rare, as they were withdrawn shortly after being released.

These coins were followed in 1935 by threepences, sixpences and shillings.

The following year, pennies were minted depicting King Edward VIII. That was relatively rare because Edward abdicated less than eleven months after succeeding to the throne, meaning that most Dominions and colonies which featured the British monarch on their currency had not yet redesigned their coins. Coins of varying denominations were minted under the reign of George VI, beginning in 1938. In 1945, production of New Guinean coins ceased until Papua New Guinea started circulating its own currency (Papua New Guinean kina) in April 1975.

== Gallery ==
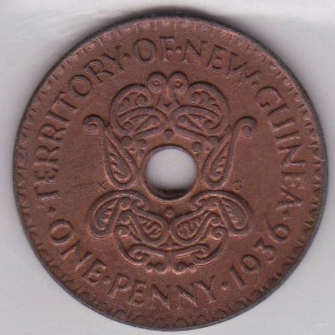
1936 penny, obverse

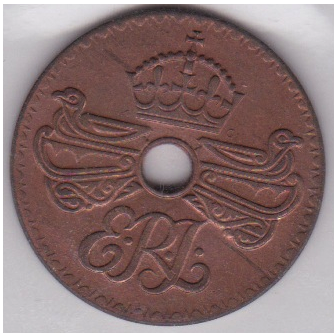
1936 penny, reverse

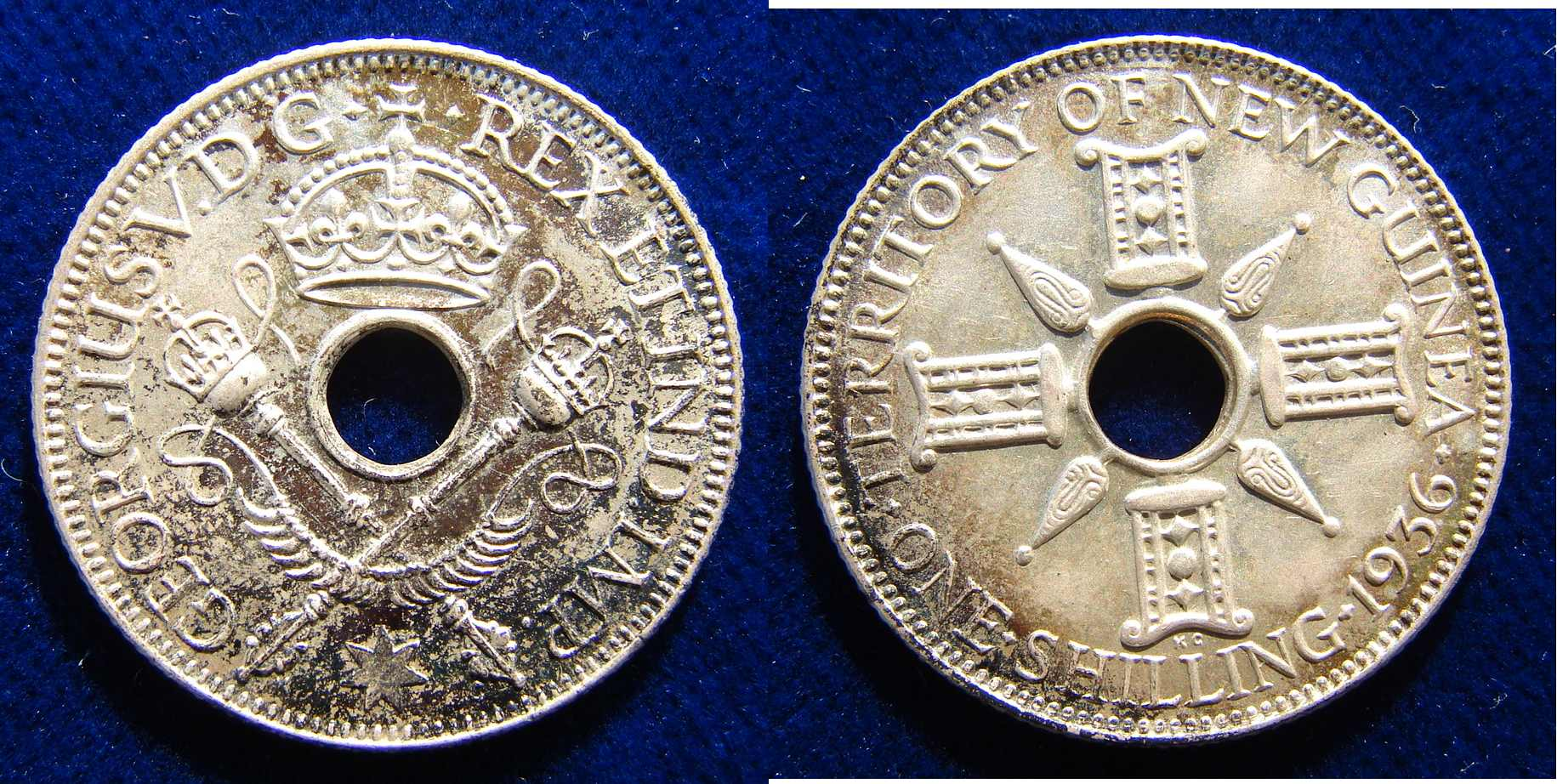
1936 shilling

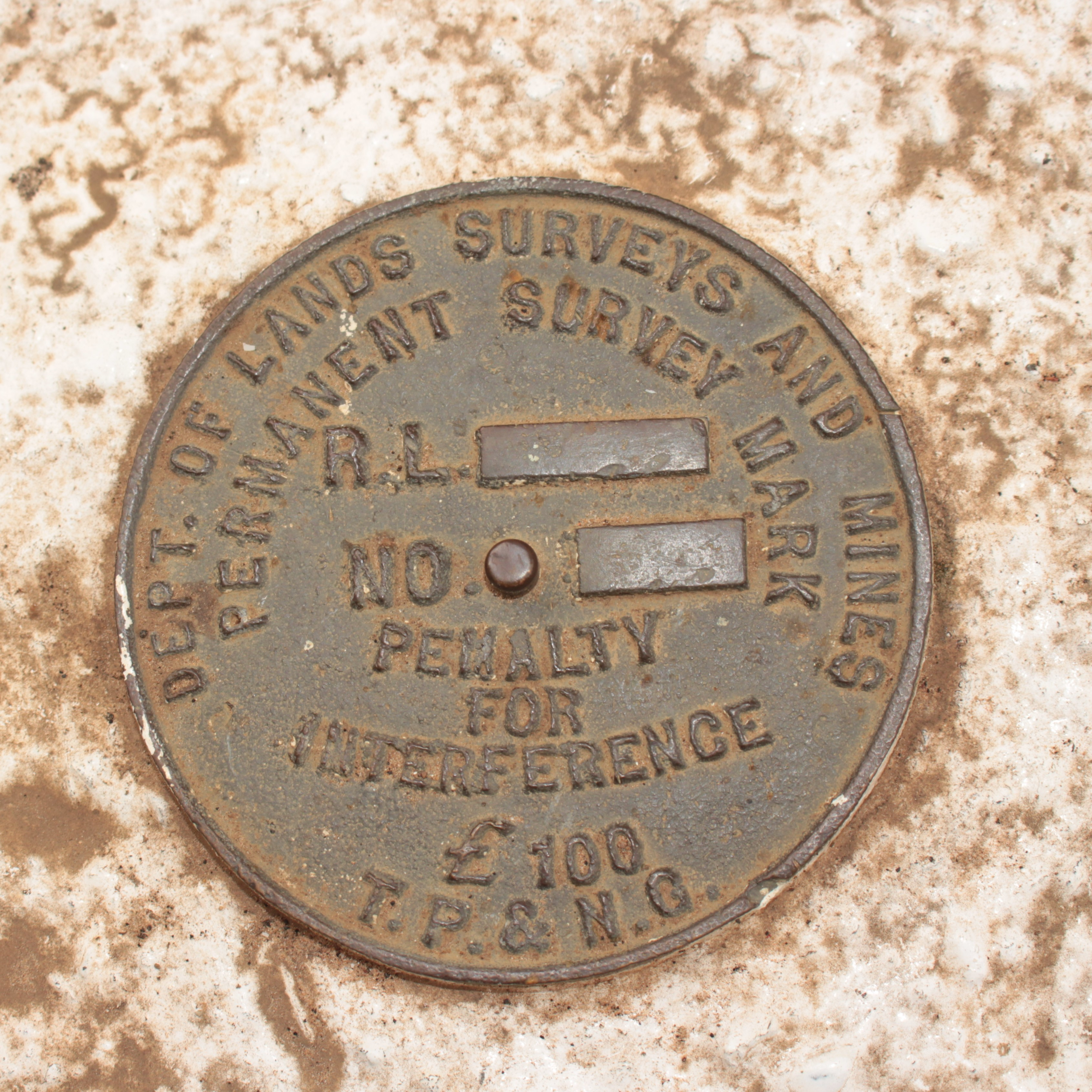
Survey marker bearing the initials of the Territory of Papua and New Guinea and indicating a fine for interference denominated in New Guinean pounds.

Preceded by: German gold mark Ratio: at par	Currency of New Guinea; 1915 – 1942; Concurrent with: Australian pound	Succeeded by: Oceania pound Reason: Japanese occupation Ratio: par

Preceded by: Oceania pound Reason: Liberation from Japanese occupation	Currency of New Guinea; 1945 – 1966; Concurrent with: Australian pound	Succeeded by: Australian dollar Reason: decimalisation Ratio: 2 dollars = 1 pound
