= Rhodesian pound =

Currency of Rhodesia from 1965 to 1970

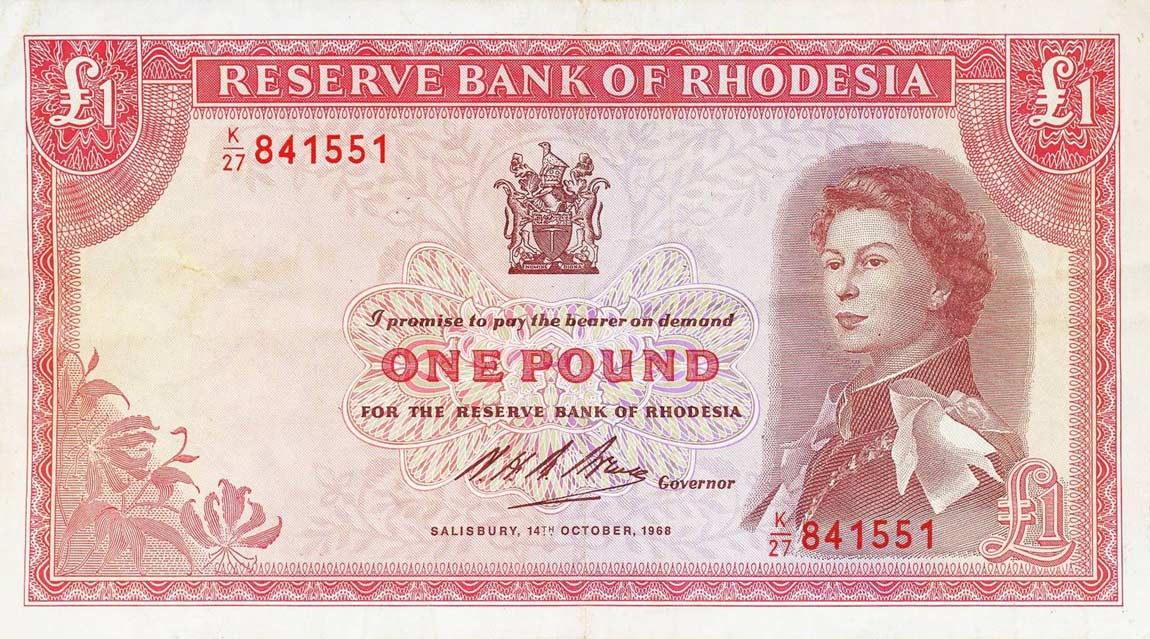
- 1968-issue £1 note

Units of account
- Base unit: pound
- Plural: pounds
- Symbol: £
- Subunit
- 1/20: shilling
- 1/240: penny
- Plural
- penny: pence
- Symbol
- shilling: s or /–
- penny: d

Denominations
- Banknotes: 10/–, £1, £5
- Coins: 3d, 6d, 1/-, 2/–, 2/6

Demographics
- User(s): Southern Rhodesia (1964–1965); Rhodesia (1965–1970)

Issuance
- Central bank: Reserve Bank of Rhodesia
- Printer: Bradbury Wilkinson (before 1965) in Rhodesia between 1966 and October 1968

Valuation
- Pegged with: £1 sterling at par, later £1 Rhodesian = US$2.80
- This infobox shows the latest status before this currency was rendered obsolete.

The pound was the currency of Southern Rhodesia from 1964 to 1965 and Rhodesia from 1965 until 1970. It was subdivided into 20 shillings, each of 12 pence.

== History ==
The Rhodesian pound was introduced following the break-up of the Federation of Rhodesia and Nyasaland, when Southern Rhodesia changed its name to simply Rhodesia. The Rhodesian pound replaced the Rhodesia and Nyasaland pound at par and the coins and banknotes of this earlier currency continued to circulate.

Like its predecessor, the Rhodesian pound was initially pegged to sterling. When sterling was devalued from US$2.8 to US$2.4 in 1967, Rhodesia switched its peg to £1 Rhodesian = US$2.8. In 1970, the pound was replaced by the dollar, at a rate of £1 Rhodesian = $2 Rhodesian, so $1 Rhodesian was US$1.40.

== Coins ==
In 1964, coins were introduced for 6d, 1/–, 2/– and 2/6. These coins also bore a denomination in cents (5^{c}, 10^{c}, 20^{c} and 25^{c}, respectively), although Rhodesia did not decimalise until 1970. This was possibly for compatibility with the South African rand, which retained a fixed 2:1 parity with the Rhodesian pound until 1967. In 1968, 3d coins were introduced which did not bear a denomination in cents. All coins had the title of Queen Elizabeth II in English, rather than in Latin, as had been the case on the coins of Rhodesia and Nyasaland and Southern Rhodesia.

== Banknotes ==
Beginning in 1964, banknotes were issued in denominations of 10/–, £1 and £5. All notes featured Queen Elizabeth II on the obverse. The reverse designs were reused on the new dollar notes introduced on 17 February 1970. The Rhodesian dollar notes are similar to the earlier Rhodesian pound issues, but marked with the new currency units, the bank logo replaces the coat of arms, and the coat of arms replaces the portrait of Queen Elizabeth II.

Prior to the UDI, Rhodesia was a member of the sterling zone. The banknotes were printed and supplied from the UK by the printers Bradbury Wilkinson. After UDI, the British government expelled Rhodesia from the sterling zone and the supply of banknotes dried up. This very soon had an adverse effect in Rhodesia, and the shortage of new notes and the condition of those in circulation began to become a pressing concern.

In early 1966, the Reserve Bank of Rhodesia ordered a completely new series of Rhodesian banknotes from the German printers Giesecke+Devrient in Munich. A court injunction prevented the banknotes from being despatched to Rhodesia, and the entire order was destroyed by the printers. Substitute consignments were printed in Rhodesia between 1966 and October 1968.

Banknotes of the Rhodesian Pound 1964–1965
| Pick No. | Image | | Value | Dimensions | Main colour | Description | | | Date of | | |
| Pick No. | Obverse | Reverse | Value | Dimensions | Main colour | Obverse | Reverse | Watermark | printing | issue | withdrawal |
|---|---|---|---|---|---|---|---|---|---|---|---|
| 24 | | | 10/– | 132 × 75 mm | Blue | Zimbabwe Bird and Queen Elizabeth II | Tobacco field | Cecil John Rhodes | 1964–1966 | 14 October 1964 | |
| 25 | | | £1 | 148 × 81 mm | Red | Flame lily and Queen Elizabeth II | Victoria Falls | Cecil John Rhodes | 1964–1966 | 7 September 1964 | |
| 26 | | | £5 | 160 × 88 mm | Grey | Sable antelope and Queen Elizabeth II | Great Zimbabwe | Cecil John Rhodes | 1964–1966 | 10 November 1964 | |

Banknotes of the Rhodesian Pound 1966–1970
| Pick No. | Image | | Value | Dimensions | Main colour | Description | | | Date of | | |
| Pick No. | Obverse | Reverse | Value | Dimensions | Main colour | Obverse | Reverse | Watermark | printing | issue | withdrawal |
|---|---|---|---|---|---|---|---|---|---|---|---|
| 27 | | | 10/– | 134 × 75 mm | Blue | Zimbabwe Bird and Queen Elizabeth II | Tobacco field | Cecil John Rhodes | 1966–1970 | 1 June 1966 | |
| 28 | | | £1 | 150 × 82 mm | Red | Flame lily and Queen Elizabeth II | Victoria Falls | Cecil John Rhodes | 1966–1970 | 15 June 1966 | |
| 29 | | | £5 | 157 × 87 mm | Grey | Sable antelope and Queen Elizabeth II | Great Zimbabwe | Cecil John Rhodes | 1966–1970 | 1 July 1966 | |

| Preceded by: Rhodesia and Nyasaland pound Reason: federation break-up Ratio: at par | Currency of Rhodesia; 1964 – 1970 | Succeeded by: Rhodesian dollar Reason: decimalisation Ratio: $2 = £1 |
