= Nigerian pound =

Currency of Nigeria between 1907 and 1973

Unit
- Symbol: £

Denominations
- Subunit
- ^{1}/_{20}: shilling
- ^{1}/_{240}: penny
- Symbol
- shilling: s or /–
- penny: d
- Banknotes: 5/–, 10/–, £1, £5
- Coins: 1/2d, 1d, 3d, 6d, 1/–, 2/–

Demographics
- Replaced: British West African pound
- Replaced by: Nigerian naira
- User(s): Nigeria

Issuance
- Central bank: Central Bank of Nigeria
- Website: www.cenbank.org
- This infobox shows the latest status before this currency was rendered obsolete.

The pound was the currency of Nigeria between 1907 and 1973. Until 1958, Nigeria used the British West African pound, after which it issued its own currency. The pound was subdivided into 20 shillings, each of 12 pence, Similar to Pre-decimal UK and many other £sd countries. The Nigerian pound, at parity with sterling with free convertibility, was replaced in 1973 with the decimal naira at a rate of £1 = ₦2, making Nigeria the last country to abandon the pre-decimal £sd currency system.

== Coins ==
Coins were issued in 1959 in denominations of 1/2, 1, 3 and 6 pence, 1 and 2 shillings. The 1/2d and 1d coins were holed and struck in bronze. The 3d coin, minted in nickel-brass, was a smaller version of the distinctive twelve-sided threepenny bits that were used in the UK, Fiji and Jersey. The higher denominations were struck in cupro-nickel.

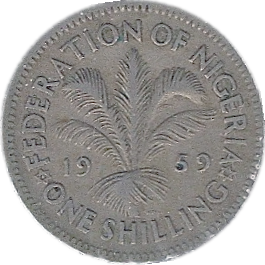
1 Nigerian Shilling

== Banknotes ==
In 1918, emergency issues were made by the government in denominations of 1/–, 10/– and 20/–. In 1959, the Central Bank of Nigeria introduced notes in denominations of 5/– and 10/–, £1 and £5. Three series of notes were issued–in 1958, 1967 and in 1968.

== See also ==
- Economy of Nigeria
