= Bermudian pound =

Former currency of Bermuda

Unit
- Symbol: £

Denominations
- Subunit
- ^{1}/_{20}: shilling (s or /–)
- ^{1}/_{240}: penny (d)
- Banknotes: 5/–, 10/–, £1, £5, £10
- Coins: 5/–

Demographics
- Date of withdrawal: 1970
- Replaced by: Bermudian dollar
- User(s): Bermuda

Issuance
- Central bank: Bermuda Currency Commissioners

Valuation
- Pegged with: sterling at par
- This infobox shows the latest status before this currency was rendered obsolete.

The pound was the currency of Bermuda until 1970. It was equivalent to sterling, alongside which it circulated, and was similarly divided into 20 shillings each of 12 pence. Bermuda decimalised in 1970, replacing the pound with the Bermudian dollar at a rate of $1 = 8s.4d. (i.e., $1 = 100d), equal to the US dollar.

== Coins ==
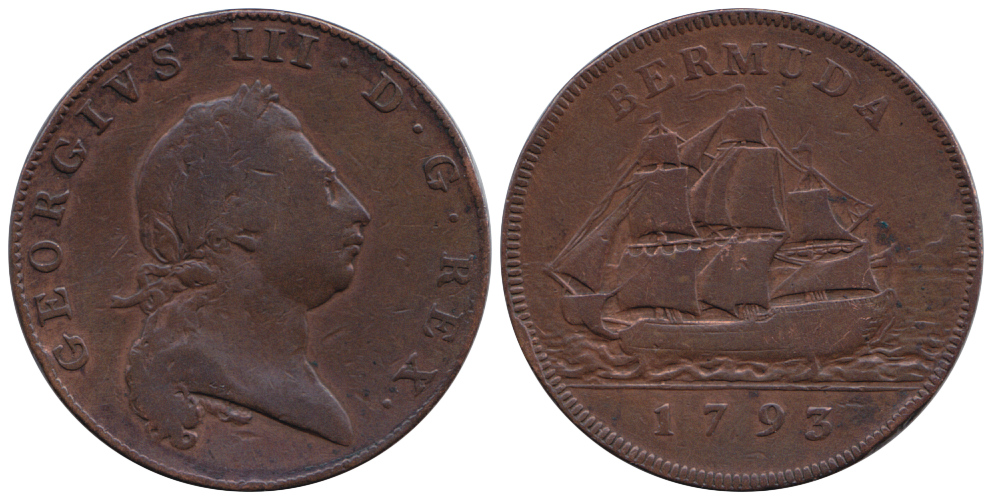
Bermuda Penny 1793, George III.

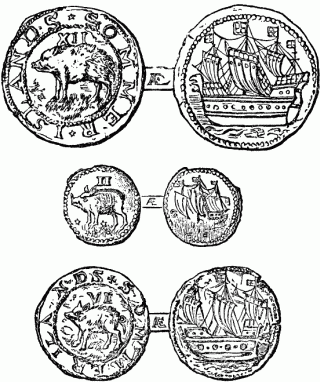
"Hogge money" featured a hog on the obverse and a sailing ship on the reverse

The first Bermudian currency issue was the so-called "hogge money", 2d, 3d and 6d, and 1/– coins issued between 1612 and 1624. Their name derives from the appearance of a pig on the obverse. At this time, Bermuda was known as Somers Island (which is still an official name) and this name appears on the coins. The next coins to be issued were copper pennies in 1793. When Bermuda adopted the sterling currency system in the first half of the nineteenth century, the coinage that circulated was exactly the standard sterling coinage that circulated in the United Kingdom. No special varieties of coinage were ever issued for general use in Bermuda. However, special silver crowns (five shillings) were issued in 1959 and again in 1964. These commemoratives were similar in appearance to the British crowns, but featured Bermudian designs on their reverses. The first issue has a map of the islands to mark their 350th anniversary of settlement. The second coin shows the islands' coat of arms. Because of the rising price of precious metals, the diameter of the 1964 issue was reduced from 38 to 36 millimeters and the silver content dropped from 92.5% to 50%. Their respective mintages were 100,000 and 500,000 (30,000 of the latter being issued in proof). Both coins remain readily available to collectors.

== Banknotes ==
In 1914, the government introduced £1 notes. In 1920, 5/– notes were introduced, followed by 10/– in 1927 and £5 in 1941. The 5/– note ceased production in 1957, with £10 notes introduced in 1964.

== History ==
For nearly four hundred years Spanish dollars, known as pieces of eight, were in widespread use on the world's trading routes, including the Caribbean Sea region. However, following the revolutionary wars in Latin America, the source of these silver trade coins dried up. The last Spanish dollar was minted at the Potosi mint in 1825.

The United Kingdom had adopted a very successful gold standard in 1821, and so the year 1825 was an opportune time to introduce the British sterling coinage into all the British colonies. An imperial order-in-council was passed in that year for the purposes of facilitating this aim by making sterling coinage legal tender in the colonies at the specified rating of $1 = 4s.4d. (One Spanish dollar to four shillings and four pence sterling). As the sterling silver coins were attached to a gold standard, this exchange rate did not realistically represent the value of the silver in the Spanish dollars as compared to the value of the gold in the British gold sovereign, and as such, the order-in-council had the reverse effect in many colonies. It had the effect of actually driving sterling coinage out, rather than encouraging its circulation.

Remedial legislation had to be introduced in 1838 so as to change over to the more realistic rating of $1 = 4s.2d. However, in Jamaica, British Honduras, Bermuda, and later in the Bahamas also, the official rating was set aside in favour of what was known as the 'Maccaroni' tradition in which a sterling shilling, referred to as a 'Maccaroni', was treated as one quarter of a dollar. The common link between these four territories was the Bank of Nova Scotia which brought in the 'Maccaroni' tradition, resulting in the successful introduction of both sterling coinage and sterling accounts.

It wasn't until 1 January 1842 that the authorities in Bermuda formally decided to make sterling the official currency of the colony to circulate concurrently with Doubloons (64 shillings) at the rate of $1 = 4s.2d. Contrary to expectations, and unlike in the Bahamas where US dollars circulated concurrently with sterling, the Bermudas did not allow themselves to be drawn into the U.S. currency area. The Spanish dollars fell away in the 1850s but returned again in the 1870s following the international silver crisis of 1873. In 1874, the Bermuda merchants agreed unanimously to decline to accept the heavy imports of U.S. currency except at a heavy discount, and it was then exported again. And in 1876, legislation was passed to demonetize the silver dollars.

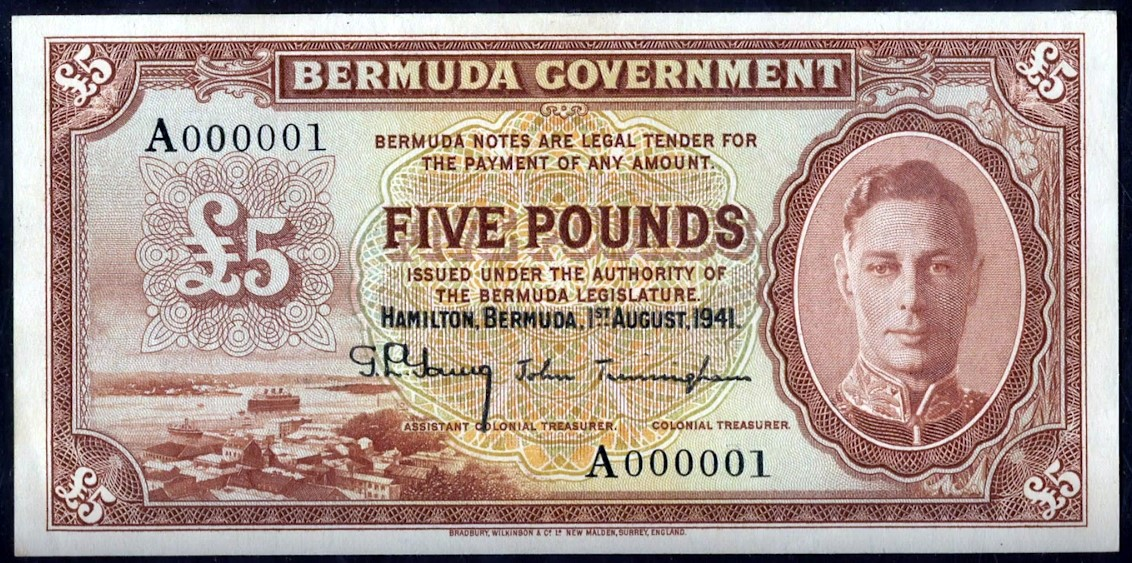
1941 £5 brown Bermuda banknote from the Ibrahim Salem collection, serial number A000001.

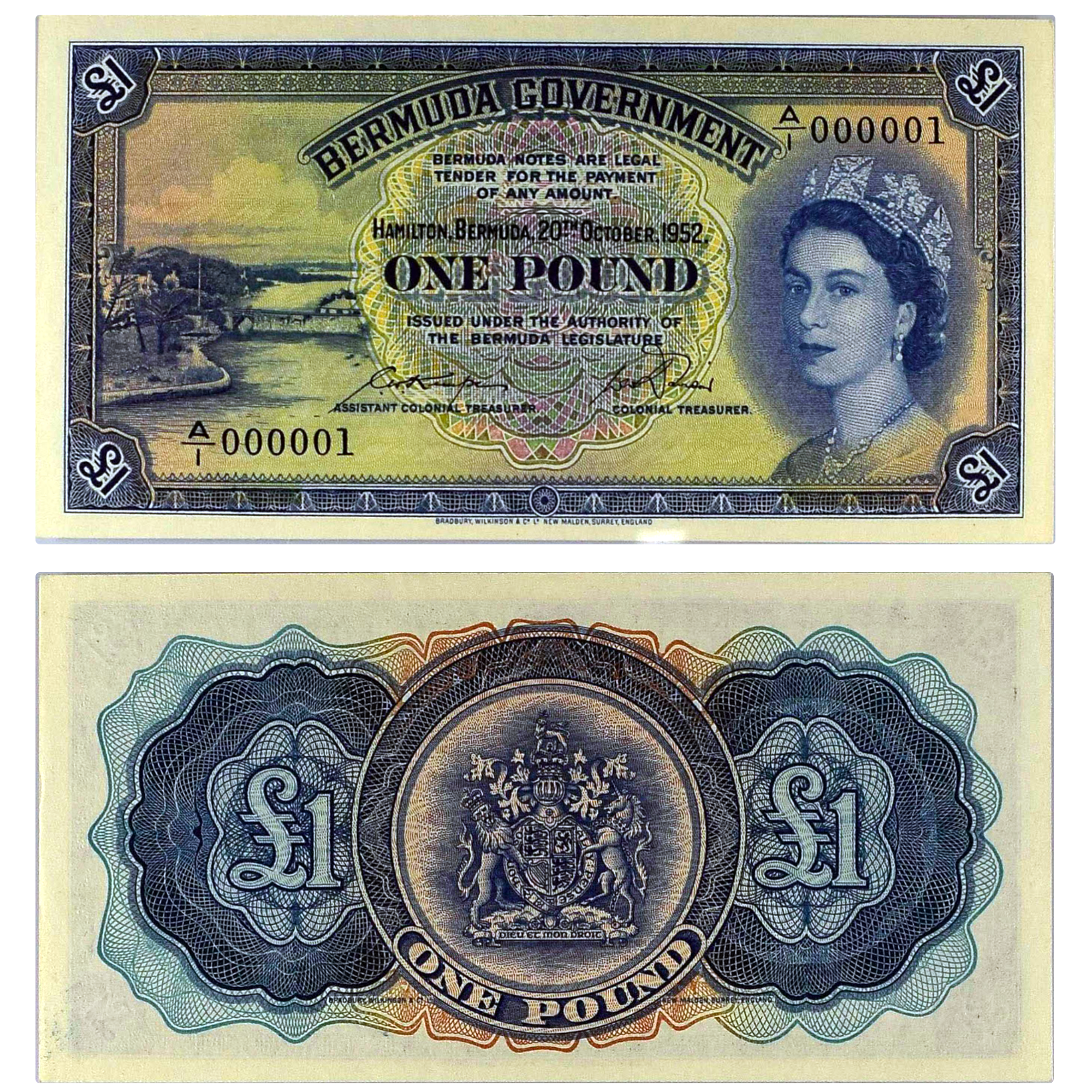
1952 £1 banknote of Bermuda

In 1882, the local 'legal tender act' demonetized the gold doubloon, which had in effect been the real standard in Bermuda, and this left sterling as the sole legal tender. Sterling then remained the official currency of Bermuda until 1970.

Due to the collapse of sterling as the world's reserve currency and the rise of the US dollar, Bermuda introduced a dollar based currency that was fixed at an equal value to the US dollar. The new Bermuda dollars operated in conjunction with decimal fractional coinage, hence ending the £sd system in that colony in the year before it was ended in the United Kingdom itself. The decision to finally align with the US dollar was at least in part influenced by the devaluation of sterling in 1967 and Bermuda's increasing tendency to keep its reserves in US dollars. Although Bermuda changed to a U.S. based currency and changed the bulk of its reserves from sterling to U.S. dollars in 1970, it still nevertheless remained a member of the sterling area since at that time, sterling and the US dollar had a fixed exchange rate of £1 = $2.40.

Following the US dollar crisis of 1971 which ended the international Bretton Woods agreement of 1944, the US dollar devalued, but the Bermuda dollar maintained its link to sterling. On 22 June 1972, the United Kingdom unilaterally ended its sterling area based exchange control laws, hence excluding Bermuda from its sterling area membership privileges. Bermuda responded on 30 June 1972 by amending its own exchange control laws accordingly, such as to impose exchange control restrictions in relation to Bermuda only. At the same time, Bermuda realigned its dollar back to one-to-one with the US dollar and formally pegged it to the US dollar at that rate. As far as United Kingdom law was concerned, Bermuda still remained a member of the overseas sterling area until exchange controls were abolished altogether in 1979.

== Bibliography ==
- Chalmers, R., "A History of Currency in the British Colonies" (1893)
- Krause, Chester L.; Clifford Mishler (1991). Standard Catalog of World Coins: 1801–1991 (18th ed.). Krause Publications. ISBN 0873411501.
- Pick, Albert (1994). Bruce, Colin R. II; Shafer, Neil (eds.). Standard Catalog of World Paper Money: General Issues (7th ed.). Krause Publications. ISBN 0-87341-207-9.
- Yeoman, R.S. (2014). Bressett, Kenneth (ed.). A Guide Book of United States Coins 2015 (68th ed.). Atlanta, Georgia: Whitman Publishing. ISBN 978-079484215-4. OCLC 875521690. OL 28306197M.
