= Rhodesian dollar =

Currency of Rhodesia from 1970 to 1980

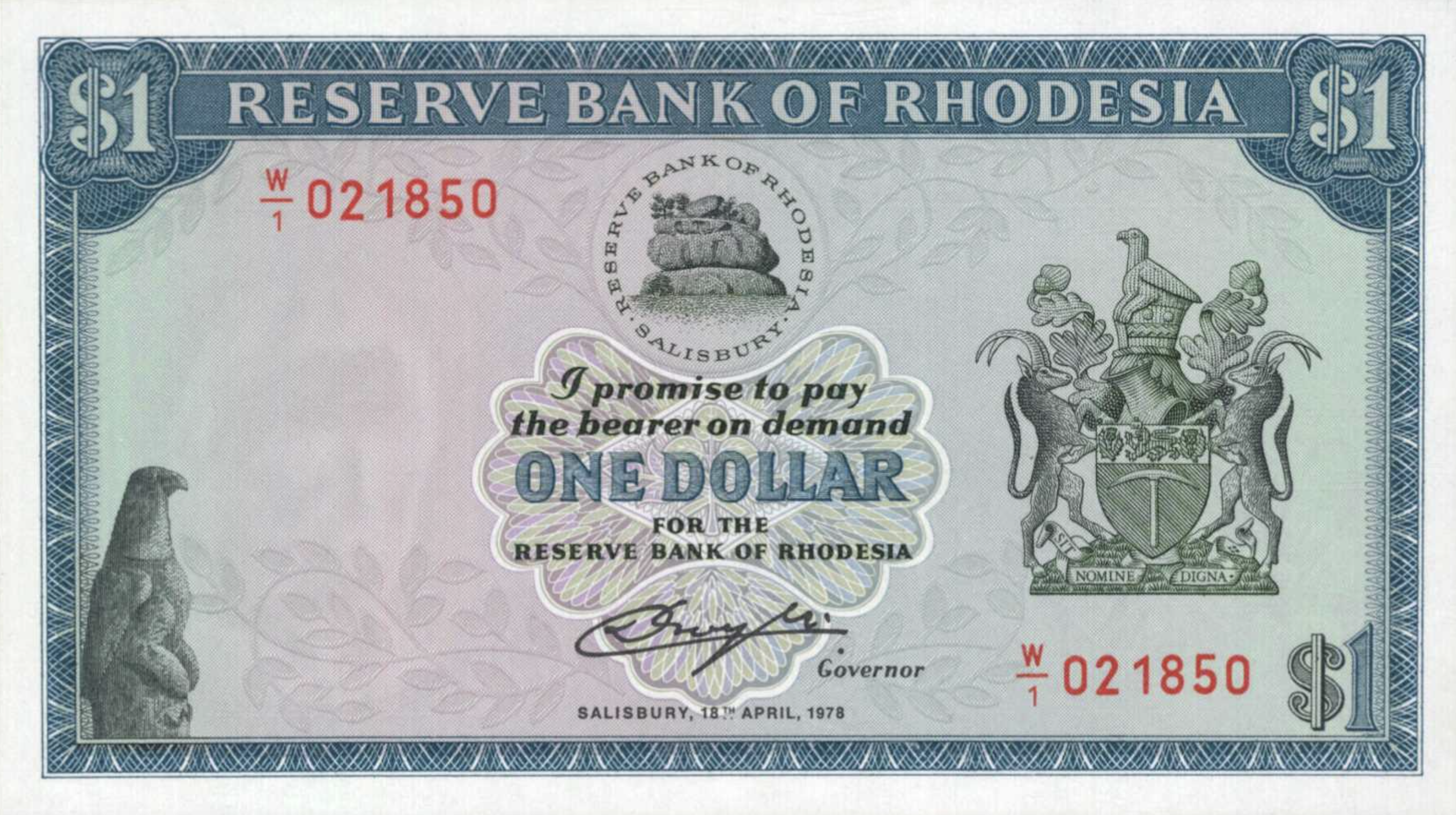
- 1 dollar note

ISO 4217
- Code: RHD

Units of account
- Symbol: $
- Subunit
- 1/100: cent

Denominations
- Banknotes: 1, 2, 5, 10 dollars
- Coins: 1/2, 1, 2 1/2, 5, 10, 20, 25 cents

Demographics
- Date of introduction: 17 February 1970
- Replaced: Rhodesian pound
- Date of withdrawal: 1980
- Replaced by: Zimbabwean dollar
- User(s): Rhodesia; Zimbabwe Rhodesia

Issuance
- Central bank: Reserve Bank of Rhodesia
- This infobox shows the latest status before this currency was rendered obsolete.

The Rhodesian dollar (R$ or Rh$, RHD) was the currency of Rhodesia between 1970 and 1980. It was subdivided into 100 cents.

== History ==
The dollar was introduced on 17 February 1970, roughly two weeks before the declaration of a republic on 2 March 1970. It replaced the Rhodesian pound at a rate of 2 dollars to 1 pound. The dollar proved to be a strong currency, at parity with the pound sterling right up to the very end of Rhodesia in 1980, when it was replaced by the Zimbabwean dollar at par. However, the Rhodesian dollar was never a fully convertible currency and its exchange rate was therefore not an indication of the underlying economics.

== Half pound ==
In adopting the Rhodesian dollar, Rhodesia followed the pattern of South Africa, Australia, and New Zealand in that when it adopted the decimal system, it decided to use the half pound unit as opposed to the pound unit of account. The choice of the name dollar was favoured by the then Minister of Finance, John Wrathall, who regarded it as having international substance.

== Coins ==
On 17 February 1970 the Rhodesian dollar was introduced and was par to the Pound; the currency was manufactured as follows - bronze 1/2 and 1 cent and cupro-nickel 2 1/2 cent coins were introduced, which circulated alongside the earlier coins of the Rhodesian pound for 5, 10, 20 and 25 cents, which were also denominated in shillings and pence. New 5-cent coins were introduced in 1973, followed by 10, 20 and 25 cents in 1975. Coins were struck until 1977 at the South African Mint in Pretoria.

Rhodesia had both 1/2 Cent and 2 1/2 Cents coins, just like in South Africa.

- The 1/2 Cent coin was struck between 1970 and 1977 - with the 1977 1/2 Cent being extremely rare, with 10 coins known.
- The 2 1/2 Cents (Tickey) was struck in 1970 only.
- The 5 Cents was struck in 1973 and between 1975 and 1977.
- The 10 and 25 Cents was struck in 1975 only.
- The 20 Cents was struck in 1975 and 1977.

Tommy Sasseen was the designer of all Rhodesian coins from 1964 to 1968 (reverse only) and 1970 to 1977 (both obverse and reverse).

== Banknotes ==
On 17 February 1970, the Reserve Bank of Rhodesia introduced notes in denominations of 1, 2 and 10 dollars. 5-dollar notes were added in 1972.

Banknotes of the Rhodesian Dollar 1970–1978
Pick No. (of example image)	Image		Value	Dimensions	Main colour	Description			Date of		
Pick No. (of example image)	Obverse	Reverse	Value	Dimensions	Main colour	Obverse	Reverse	Watermark	printing	issue	withdrawal
34c			$1	134 × 75 mm	Blue	Zimbabwe Bird	Tobacco field	Cecil John Rhodes	1970–1978	17 February 1970	
31d			$2	149 × 83 mm	Red	Flame lily	Victoria Falls	Cecil John Rhodes	1970–1978	17 February 1970	
36b			$5	152 × 86 mm	Brown	Giraffe	Lions	Cecil John Rhodes	1972–1978	16 October 1972	
37a			$10	158 × 88 mm	Grey	Sable antelope	Great Zimbabwe	Cecil John Rhodes	1970–1978	17 February 1970	

On 2 January 1979, the Reserve Bank of Rhodesia replaced the watermark of Cecil Rhodes with that of the Zimbabwe Bird, following the Internal Settlement, which saw the country renamed Zimbabwe Rhodesia.

Banknotes of the Rhodesian Dollar 1979–1980
Pick No.	Image		Value	Dimensions	Main colour	Description			Date of		
Pick No.	Obverse	Reverse	Value	Dimensions	Main colour	Obverse	Reverse	Watermark	printing	issue	withdrawal
38			$1	134 × 75 mm	Blue	Zimbabwe Bird	Tobacco field	Zimbabwe Bird	1979–1980	2 August 1979	
39			$2	149 × 83 mm	Red	Flame lily	Victoria Falls	Zimbabwe Bird	1979–1980	24 May 1979	
40			$5	152 × 86 mm	Brown	Giraffe	Lions	Zimbabwe Bird	1979–1980	15 May 1979	
41			$10	158 × 88 mm	Grey	Sable antelope	Great Zimbabwe	Zimbabwe Bird	1979–1980	2 January 1979	

== Exchange rate history ==
This table shows the historical value of one Rhodesian dollar.

Date	Official Rate	Free / Parallel Rate	notes
1970 (Feb)	US$1.40	—	Parallel market starts 1970 (July)
1971 (Aug)	R 1.00	(−30%) R 0.769	Pegged to the ZA Rand
1971 (Dec)	US$1.52	(−30% to 40%) US$1.09 to US$1.17	US dollar devalued
1972 (July)	floated	(−20% to 30%)	Floated at same time GBP was floated
1972 (Oct)	US$1.52; R 1.19	—	—
1973 (Feb)	US$1.69	—	USD devalued
1973 (Jun)	US$1.773; R 1.19	—	ZA Rand and R$ revalued against USD
1975 (Sep)	US$1.60; R 1.34	—	R$ devalued against USD and ZAR
1977 (Oct)	US$1.50; R 1.30	(−69%) US$0.46; R 0.40	R$ devalued against USD and ZAR
1980 (Mar)	—	—	Pegged to flexible basket (FRF, DEM, ZAR, CHF, GBP, USD)
1980 (Apr)	—	—	Replacement by the Zimbabwean dollar Z$1 = R$1
1981	—	—	Rhodesian dollar demonetised under Statutory Instrument 378 of the Government of Zimbabwe

Preceded by: Rhodesian pound Reason: decimalization Ratio: 2 dollars = 1 pound	Currency of Rhodesia (Zimbabwe since 1980); 1970 – 1980	Succeeded by: Zimbabwean dollar Reason: independence recognized Ratio: at par
