= Malawian pound =

Historical currency of Malawi

Units of account
- Symbol: £
- Subunit
- 1/20: shilling
- 1/240: penny
- Symbol
- shilling: s or /–
- penny: d

Denominations
- Banknotes: 5/–, 10/–, £1, £5
- Coins: 1d, 6d, 1/–, 2/–, 2/6

Demographics
- Date of withdrawal: 1971
- Replaced by: Malawian kwacha
- User(s): Malawi

Issuance
- Central bank: Reserve Bank of Malawi
- Website: www.rbm.mw
- This infobox shows the latest status before this currency was rendered obsolete.

The pound was the currency of Malawi until 1971. From 1932, Malawi (then known as Nyasaland) used the Southern Rhodesian pound. In 1955, a new currency was introduced, the Rhodesia and Nyasaland pound. This was replaced by the Malawian pound in 1964, following Malawi's independence. The pound was subdivided into 20 shillings, each of 12 pence. The pound was replaced by the decimal kwacha in 1971, at a rate of 2 kwacha = 1 pound.

== Coins ==
In 1964, coins were issued in copper-nickel and in the denominations of 6d, 1/–, 2/– and 2/6. All bore the portrait of Hastings Banda. 1d coins were introduced in 1967. The 1d had a smooth edge whereas all the other coins had 4×4 interrupted milling.

== Banknotes ==
On 6 July 1964, Nyasaland became independent from Britain and was renamed Malawi. For two years, Elizabeth II, remained head of state as Queen of Malawi. Upon becoming a republic in 1966, Malawi became a single-party state under the presidency of Hastings Kamuzu Banda, who remained president until 1994, when he was ousted from power. His portrait appears on the front of all notes issued during his three decades in office, with scenes on the back emphasizing agriculture's great importance to Malawi's economy. Notes during his presidency also carry watermarks (and later registration devices) of a rooster, the symbol of Banda's Malawi Congress Party. The first series of notes dated 1964 and issued by the Reserve Bank of Malawi consists of the denominations 5/–, 10/–, £1 and £5.

Preceded by: Rhodesia and Nyasaland pound Reason: independence Ratio: at par	Currency of Malaŵi; 1964 – 1971	Succeeded by: Malawian kwacha Ratio: 2 kwacha = 1 pound
