= Zambian pound =

Currency of Zambia (1964–1968)

- £1 note

Unit
- Symbol: £

Denominations
- Subunit
- 1/20: shilling (s or /–)
- 1/240: penny (d)
- Banknotes: 10/–, £1, £5
- Coins
- Rarely used: 1d, 6d, 1/–, 2/–

Demographics
- User(s): Zambia

Issuance
- Central bank: Bank of Zambia
- Website: www.boz.zm

The pound was the currency of Zambia from independence in 1964 until decimalization on January 16, 1968. It was subdivided into 20 shillings, each of 12 pence.

== History ==
The Zambian pound replaced the Rhodesia and Nyasaland pound at par. It was pegged 1:1 to sterling and was replaced by the kwacha at a rate of £1 = ZK2 or ZK1 = 10/–.

== Coins ==
In 1964, cupro-nickel 6d, 1/– and 2/– coins were introduced, followed by a 5/– coin in 1965, and holed, bronze 1d coins in 1966.

== Banknotes ==
In 1964, the Bank of Zambia introduced notes in denominations of 10/–, £1 and £5.

Image	Denomination	Obverse	Reverse
	10 shillings	Chaplin's barbet	Farmers plowing with tractor and oxen
	1 pound	Black-cheeked lovebird	Mining tower and conveyors
	5 pounds	Wildebeest	Victoria Falls

Preceded by: Rhodesia and Nyasaland pound Reason: independence Ratio: at par	Currency of Zambia; 1964 – 1968	Succeeded by: Zambian kwacha Ratio: 2 kwacha = 1 pound
