= Bahamian pound =

Historical currency of the Bahamas

Demographics
- Date of withdrawal: 1966
- User(s): Bahamas
- This infobox shows the latest status before this currency was rendered obsolete.

The pound was the currency of the Bahamas until 1966, issued by the Board of Commissioners of Currency. It was equivalent to the pound sterling and was divided into 20 shillings, each of 12 pence. Standard sterling coinage circulated. Apart from a Bahamas penny coin struck in 1806, there were no special coin issues such as were found in Jamaica.

== History ==
In 1825, an imperial Order-in-Council was passed to introduce sterling coinage into all the British colonies. It was not immediately very effective due to unrealistic ratings, and it required a further Order-in-Council to be passed in 1838. By the middle of the 19th century, Sterling coinage had replaced the Spanish dollar throughout all of the British West Indies. But it was only in the Bahamas, Bermuda, and Jamaica that the pound was used as a unit of account. In the Eastern Caribbean territories and in British Guiana, the US dollar unit of account was retained in conjunction with the British coinage at a fixed rate of one dollar to four shillings and two pence (£1 = $4.80). Unlike in Bermuda, the dollar circulated freely alongside sterling coinage in the Bahamas.

The pound was replaced by the dollar in 1966, at a rate of 7/– (seven shillings) = $1 (£1 = $2.85 5/7). This rate meant that the new Bahamas dollar was at a slight discount to the US dollar (to which it had been pegged at the rate £1= $2.80).

For a wider outline of the history of currency in the region, see currencies of the British West Indies.

== Coins ==
The only coin issued was a 1 penny coin struck in 1806. British coins circulated on the islands until 1966.

== Banknotes ==
The Bank of Nassau initially issued notes in denominations of 5/–, 10/–, and £1. 4/– notes were introduced in 1906. The bank failed in 1917, and the Bahamas government took over the issuance of banknotes on the islands.

The Public Treasury issued £1 notes in 1868, followed by government notes in 1869 for £1 and £5. In 1919, a new series of 4/–, 10/–, and £1 notes was introduced, with £5 notes reintroduced after 1936.
