= Western Samoan pound =

Currency of Western Samoa from 1914 to 1967

The pound was the currency of Western Samoa between 1914 and 1967. It was subdivided into 20 shillings, each of 12 pence.

== History ==
In 1914, following the New Zealand occupation of German Samoa, the pound sterling replaced the German mark as the currency of the territory. When the New Zealand pound broke its parity with the pound sterling in 1930 at the beginning of the Great Depression, the Samoan unit followed the same course as the New Zealand pound. There were no special issues of sterling coinage issued for Western Samoa. The circulating coinage was originally United Kingdom coinage and from 1934 it became predominantly the new New Zealand coinage. When New Zealand decimalized its currency in 1967, the Western Samoan pound was replaced by the tālā, at a rate of 1 pound = 2 tala.

For a more general view of history in the wider region, see British currency in Oceania.

== Banknotes ==
In 1915, the first, provisional notes (dated 1914 but issued 1915) were issued by the New Zealand Occupying Military force. These were overprinted one pound and five pound notes of the Bank of New Zealand signed by Lt. Colonel Logan. Overprinted Ten shillings notes of the Bank of New Zealand were added in 1920. In 1922, Treasury Notes were issued "by the authority of the New Zealand Government" in denominations of 10 shillings, 1 and 5 pounds. These notes were issued until 1961, when the Bank of Western Samoa took over paper money issuance. The Bank's first issues were overprints on the Treasury Notes. In 1963, regular type notes were introduced in identical denominations.
