= Albert Pick =

German numismatist

- Born: 15 May 1922; Cologne
- Died: November 22, 2015 (aged 93); Garmisch-Partenkirchen, Bavaria, Germany

Albert Pick (15 May 1922 – 22 November 2015) was a German numismatist. An internationally acknowledged authority on the subject of paper money, Pick wrote the first modern catalog of banknotes in 1974, and is widely credited with establishing the modern face of banknote collecting. His Standard Catalog of World Paper Money is the standard reference work for banknote collectors worldwide.

== Career ==
Pick started a collection of banknotes as a child in 1930. Later, after his war service (including a year in a POW camp in the U.S.), he went on to study philosophy, literature and history. He worked as the manager of a publishing house while amassing his collection of banknotes, at a time when notaphily, the collecting and study of paper money, was still in its infancy and a relatively cheap hobby.

Over the years Pick became an acknowledged expert in the field of banknotes, and by 1964 his private collection of (at that time) 180,000 notes had become too extensive for a private collector. In that year the collection was received by the Bavarian Mortgages and Exchange Bank (Bayerische Hypotheken- und Wechselbank, now HypoVereinsbank). Pick was retained as a curator in the service of the bank between 1964 and 1985 and continued to expand the collection.

Albert Pick lent his name to the Pick-numbers system, whereby collectors can unambiguously identify and catalogue each banknote.

Besides his best known work, the Standard Catalog of World Paper Money, Pick published numerous books abroad and received several international prizes and honors for his publications.

In the last years of his life he lived in retirement in Garmisch, Bavaria, Germany.
