= List of £10 banknotes and coins =

This is a list of £10 banknotes, bills, and coins.

== Current currencies ==
- Sterling
  - Bank of England £10 note
  - Bank of Scotland £10 note
  - The Royal Bank of Scotland £10 note
  - Bank of Ireland £10 note
  - Clydesdale Bank £10 note
- Egyptian £10 note
- Falklands £10 note
- Gibraltarian £10 note
- Guernsey £10 note
- Jersey £10 note
- Manx £10 note
- Sudanese LS 10 note
- Saint Helena £10 note
- Syrian LS 10 coin

== Obsolete currencies ==
- Australian £A 10 note
- Bermudian £10 note
- Cypriot £C 10 note
- Fijian £10 note
- Irish pound
  - Series A IR£10 note
  - Series B IR£10 note
  - Series C IR£10 note
- Israeli IL10 note
- Libyan £L10 note
- Maltese £M 10 note
- New Brunswick £10 note
- New Zealand £NZ 10 note
- Nova Scotian £10 note
- Palestinian £P10 note
- South African £SA 10 note
- South West African £10 note
- Thirteen Colonies:
  - Connecticut £10 bill
  - Delawarean £10 bill
  - Georgian £10 bill
  - Maryland £10 bill
  - Massachusettsan £10 bill
  - New Hampshire £10 bill
  - New Jerseyan £10 bill
  - New York £10 bill
  - North Carolinian £10 bill
  - Pennsylvanian £10 bill
  - Rhode Island £10 bill
  - South Carolinian £10 bill
  - Virginian £10 bill
- Tongan £10 note
- Western Samoan £10 note

== See also ==
- List of £1
- List of £5 banknotes and coins
