= Timocracy =

Form of government, where power derives from wealth

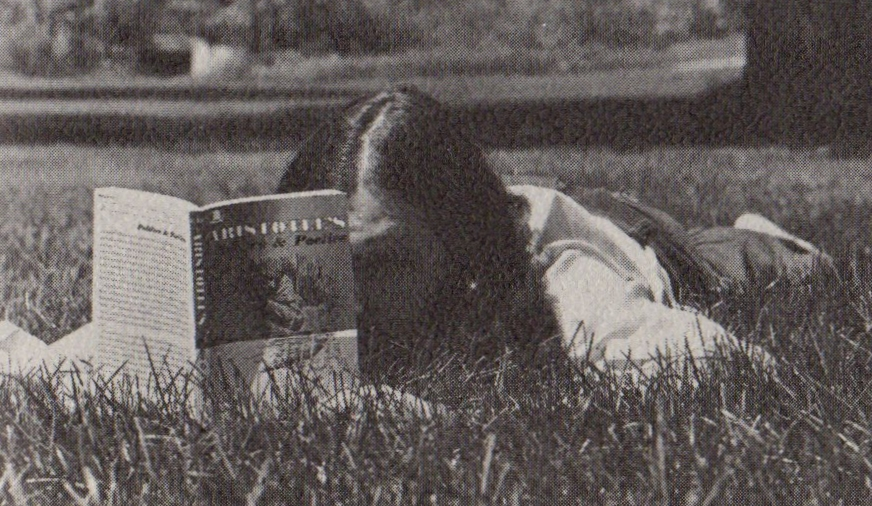
A student reading a translation of Aristotle's Politics.

A timocracy (Ancient Greek: τιμοκρατία; from Greek τιμή timē, "honor, worth" and -κρατία -kratia, "rule") in Aristotle's Politics referred to a type of government in which citizens were equal in most respects, but their political participation was determined by a hierarchy based on property. Those whose wealth required them to contribute more to public expenses enjoyed greater political privileges in proportion to their means. More advanced forms of timocracy, where power derives entirely from wealth with no regard for social or civic responsibility, may shift in their form and become a plutocracy where the wealthy rule.

== Ancient Greece ==
Solon introduced the ideas of timokratia as a graded oligarchy in his Solonian Constitution for Athens in the early 6th century BC. His was the first known deliberately implemented form of timocracy, allocating political rights and economic responsibility depending on membership of one of four tiers of the population. Solon defined these tiers by measuring how many bushels of produce each man could produce in a year, namely:

- Pentacosiomedimnoi – "Men of the 500 bushel", those who produced 500 bushels of produce per year, could serve as generals in the army
- Hippeis – Knights, those who could equip themselves and one cavalry horse for war, valued at 300 bushels per year
- Zeugitae – Tillers, owners of at least one pair of beasts of burden, valued at 200 bushels per year, could serve as hoplites
- Thetes – Manual laborers

N. G. L. Hammond supposes Solon instituted a graduated tax upon the upper classes, levied in a ratio of 6:3:1, with the lowest class of thetes paying nothing in taxes but remaining ineligible for elected office.

Aristotle later wrote in his Nicomachean Ethics (Book 8, Chapter 10) about three "true political forms" for a state, each of which could appear in corrupt form, becoming one of three negative forms. Aristotle describes timocracy in the sense of rule by property-owners: it comprised one of his true political forms. Aristotelian timocracy approximated to the constitution of Athens, although Athens exemplified the corrupted version of this form, described as democracy.

== Thirteen Colonies ==
In the early times of American independence only men who would hold enough property and money (except in New Jersey, where women meeting the requirements were allowed as well) could vote; there were also at times requirement of race:

- Connecticut: an estate worth 40 shillings annually or £40 of personal property
- Delaware: fifty acres of land (twelve under cultivation) or £40 of personal property
- Georgia: fifty acres of land
- Maryland: fifty acres of land and £40 personal property
- Massachusetts Bay: an estate worth 40 shillings annually or £40 of personal property
- New Hampshire: £50 of personal property
- New Jersey: one-hundred acres of land, or real estate or personal property £50
- New York: £40 of personal property or ownership of land
- North Carolina: fifty acres of land
- Pennsylvania: fifty acres of land or £50 of personal property
- Rhode Island and Providence Plantations: personal property worth £40 or yielding 50 shillings annually
- South Carolina: one-hundred acres of land on which taxes were paid; or a town house or lot worth £60 on which taxes were paid; or payment of 10 shillings in taxes
- Virginia: fifty acres of vacant land, twenty-fives acres of cultivated land, and a house twelve feet by twelve feet; or a town lot and a house twelve feet by twelve

== Other places ==
=== Uthiramerur ===
In the Uthiramerur inscription of the Chola dynasty, which lays down the rules for who could become a member of the Sabha, one of the requirements for a nominee was to possess and reside on a certain area of land, which may be considered a form of timocracy.

=== Decentralized Autonomous Organisations ===
In decentralized autonomous organisations, a software system for organization of other computer programs handled through a decentralized ledger technology like a blockchain, tokens can be used to distributed voting power. Governance is conducted through a series of proposals that voting addresses vote on through the blockchain, and the possession of more such tokens often translates to greater voting power. That phenomena can be considered a form of timocracy.

== Timocracy, comparable values, and Plato's five regimes ==
In The Republic, Plato describes five regimes (of which four are unjust). Timocracy (Book VIII, 545 B - 550 B) is listed as the first "unjust" regime. Aristocracy degenerates into timocracy when, due to miscalculation on the part of its governed class, the next generation of guardians and auxiliaries includes persons of an inferior nature. A timocracy, in choosing its leaders, is "inclining rather to the more high-spirited and simple-minded type, who are better suited for war". The city-state of Sparta provided Plato with a real-world model for this form of government. Modern observers might describe Sparta as a totalitarian or one-party state, although the details we know of its society come almost exclusively from Sparta's enemies. The idea of militarism-stratocracy accurately reflects the fundamental values of Spartan society. The only one of Plato's five regimes that he does deem fit to govern is aristocracy, the four other regimes (including timocracy) are unjust according to Plato. The unjust regimes in Plato's work refer to forms of governing that lead to chaos and ultimately corruption.

== See also ==
- Census suffrage
- Forty-shilling freeholders

== Bibliography ==
- Jesús Padilla Gálvez, Towards a New Timocracy, Synthesis Philosophica, 76, 2/2023, pp. 361–377. doi: 10.21464/sp38207.
- Websters New World Dictionary of the American Language, 2nd College Edition, p. 1490
