= Currency Act =

British legislation regulating colonial money in America

The Currency Act or Paper Bills of Credit Act is one of several Acts of the Parliament of Great Britain that regulated paper money issued by the colonies of British America. The Acts sought to protect British merchants and creditors from being paid in depreciated colonial currency. The policy created tension between the colonies and Great Britain and was cited as a grievance by colonists early in the American Revolution. However, the consensus view among modern economic historians and economists is that the debts by colonists to British merchants were not a major cause of the Revolution. In 1995, a random survey of 178 members of the Economic History Association found that 92% of economists and 74% of historians disagreed with the statement, "The debts owed by colonists to British merchants and other private citizens constituted one of the most powerful causes leading to the Revolution."

== Economic climate of the colonies ==
From their origin, the colonies struggled with the development of an effective medium of exchange for goods and services. After depleting the vast majority of their monetary resources through imports, the first settlers strained to keep money in circulation. They could not find a suitable medium of exchange in which the value did not depreciate. The colonists generally employed three main types of currency. The first was commodity money, using the staple of a given region as a means of exchange. The second was specie, or gold or silver money. Lastly, paper money (or fiat money), issued in the form of a bill of exchange or a banknote, mortgaged on the value of the land that an individual owned.

Each year, the supply of specie in the colonies decreased due to international factors. The dearth of specie rendered it ineffective as a means of exchange for day-to-day purchases. Colonists frequently adopted a barter system to acquire the goods and services they required. Essentially, this method proved to be ineffective and a commodity system was adopted in its place. Tobacco was used as a monetary substitute in Virginia as early as 1619. A major shortcoming of this system was that the quality of the substitutes was inconsistent. The poorer qualities ended up in circulation while the finer qualities were inevitably exported. This commodity system became increasingly ineffective as colonial debts increased.

In 1690, Massachusetts became the first colony to issue paper currency. This currency was employed as a means to finance its share of the debt from King William's War. Other colonies quickly followed suit, and by 1715 ten of the thirteen had resorted to the issuance of paper currency. Economist Stanley Finkelstein highlights the advantage of paper currency, "that unless it is backed by specie it is cost-free currency". The paper currency depreciated quickly because the colonies printed more than what was taxed out of circulation. By 1740, Rhode Island bills of exchange were only four percent of face value and those of Massachusetts was eleven percent. The money supply was growing at a much faster rate than that of the overall colonial economy, which led to hyperinflation and the corresponding reduction in purchasing power per unit of money. British merchants were forced to accept this depreciated currency as a repayment of debts. This led to the Currency Act 1751.

== Currency Act 1751 ==
Currency Act 1751
- Act of Parliament
- Parliament of Great Britain
- Long title: An Act to regulate and restrain Paper Bills of Credit in his Majesty’s Colonies or Plantations of Rhode Island and Providence Plantations, Connecticut, the Massachusets Bay, and New Hampshire in America; and to prevent the same being legal Tenders in Payments of Money.
- Citation: 24 Geo. 2. c. 53
- Territorial extent: Great Britain; Colonies of Rhode Island, Providence, Connecticut, Massachusetts, and New Hampshire; (Note: Section 1.)

Dates
- Royal assent: 25 June 1751
- Commencement: 29 September 1751
- Repealed: 15 July 1867
Other legislation
Repealed by	Statute Law Revision Act 1867

Status: Repealed

Text of statute as originally enacted

The first act, the Currency Act 1751 (24 Geo. 2. c. 53), restricted the issue of paper money and the establishment of new public banks by the colonies of New England. These colonies had issued paper fiat money known as "bills of credit" to help pay for military expenses during the French and Indian Wars. Because more paper money was issued than what was taxed out of circulation, the currency depreciated in relation to the British pound sterling. The resultant inflation was harmful to merchants in Great Britain, who were forced to accept the depreciated currency from colonists for payment of debts.

The act limited the future issue of bills of credit to certain circumstances. It allowed the existing bills to be used as legal tender for public debts (i.e. paying taxes), but did not allow their use for private debts (e.g. for paying merchants).

== Currency Act 1764 ==
Currency Act 1764
- Act of Parliament
- Parliament of Great Britain
- Long title: An Act to prevent paper bills of credit hereafter to be issued in any of His Majesty's colonies or plantations in America from being declared to be a legal tender in payments of money, and to prevent the legal tender of such bills as are now subsisting from being prolonged beyond the periods limited for calling in and sinking the same.
- Citation: 4 Geo. 3. c. 34
- Territorial extent: Great Britain

Dates
- Royal assent: 19 April 1764
- Commencement: 1 September 1764
- Repealed: 15 July 1867
Other legislation
Amended by	Paper Currency in America Act 1772
Repealed by	Statute Law Revision Act 1867
Relates to	Colony of New York Act 1770

Status: Repealed

Text of statute as originally enacted

Colony of New York Act 1770
- Act of Parliament
- Parliament of Great Britain
- Long title: An act to enable the governor, council, and assembly of his Majesty's colony of New York, to pass an act of assembly for creating and issuing upon loan paper bills of credit to a certain amount; and to make the same a legal tender in payments into the loan offices and treasury of the said colony.
- Citation: 10 Geo. 3. c. 35
- Territorial extent: Great Britain; Colony of New York

Dates
- Royal assent: 19 May 1770
- Commencement: 9 January 1770 (Note: Start of session.)
- Repealed: 15 July 1867
Other legislation
Repealed by	Statute Law Revision Act 1867
Relates to	Currency Act 1764

Status: Repealed

Text of statute as originally enacted

Paper Currency in America Act 1772
- Act of Parliament
- Parliament of Great Britain
- Long title: An Act to explain and amend an Act made in the fourth year of His present Majesty, intituled "An Act to prevent paper bills of credit hereafter to be issued in any of His Majesty's colonies or plantations in America from being declared to be a legal tender in payments of money, and to prevent the legal tender of such bills as are now subsisting from being prolonged beyond the periods limited for calling in and sinking the same."
- Citation: 13 Geo. 3. c. 57
- Territorial extent: Great Britain; Colony of New York

Dates
- Royal assent: 21 June 1773
- Commencement: 1 September 1773
- Repealed: 4 April 1870
Other legislation
Amends	Currency Act 1764
Repealed by	Coinage Act 1870

Status: Repealed

Text of statute as originally enacted

The Currency Act 1764 (4 Geo. 3. c. 34) extended the 1751 act to all of the British colonies of North America. Unlike the earlier act, this statute did not prohibit the colonies from issuing paper money, but it did forbid them from designating future currency issues as legal tender for public and private debts. This tight money policy created financial difficulties in the colonies, where gold and silver were in short supply. Benjamin Franklin, a colonial agent in London, lobbied for repeal of the act over the next several years, as did other agents. The act arose when Virginia farmers continued to import during the French and Indian War. Virginia issued £250,000 in bills of credit to finance both public and private debts. This legislation differed from the 1751 act in that it prohibited the colonists from designating paper currency for use as payment for any debts, public or private. Parliament did not, however, prohibit the colonists from issuing paper money. The act was put into place as a hedge against risks associated with economic fluctuations and uncertainty.

The colonial government of the Province of New York insisted that the Currency Act prevented it from providing funds for British troops in compliance with the Quartering Act 1765. As a result, in 1770, Parliament gave permission in the Colony of New York Act 1770 (10 Geo. 3. c. 35) for New York to issue £120,000 in paper currency for public but not private debts. Parliament extended these concessions to the other colonies in 1773 via the Paper Currency in America Act 1772 (13 Geo. 3. c. 57) by amending the Currency Act 1764, permitting the colonies to issue paper currency as legal tender for public debts. According to historian Jack Sosin, the British government had made its point:

After nine years, the colonial agents had secured a paper currency for the provinces. But the Americans had tacitly, if not implicitly, acknowledged the authority of Parliament. And in the final analysis this was all the imperial government wanted.

== Legacy ==
Currency Acts created tension between the colonies and the mother country, and were a contributing factor in the coming of the American Revolution. In all of the colonies except Delaware, the acts were considered to be a "major grievance". When the First Continental Congress met in 1774, it issued a Declaration of Rights, which outlined colonial objections to certain acts of Parliament. Congress called on Parliament to repeal the Currency Act 1764, one of seven acts labeled "subversive of American rights".

However, according to historians Jack Greene and Richard Jellison, the currency debate was no longer really a "live issue" in 1774, due to the 1773 amendment of the act. The controversy's most important impact was psychological, in that it helped convince many colonists that Parliament did not understand or care about their problems. Colonial leaders came to believe that they, rather than Parliament, were better suited to legislate for the colonies.

== See also ==
- Early American currency
- Gold Standard Act of the United States (1900), also sometimes called the "Currency Act"
- Mercantilism
- Navigation Acts
- Sugar Act 1764
- Stamp Act 1765
- Monetary sovereignty

== Bibliography ==
- Allen, Larry (2009). The Encyclopedia of Money (2nd ed.). Santa Barbara, CA: ABC-CLIO. pp. 96–98. ISBN 978-1598842517.
- Finkelstein, Stanley S. "The Currency Act of 1764: A Quantitative Reappraisal." The American Economist 12.2 (1968): 38–47.
- Greene, Jack P. and Richard M. Jellison. "The Currency Act of 1764 in Imperial-Colonial Relations, 1764–1776". The William and Mary Quarterly, Third Series, Vol. 18, No. 4 (October 1961), 485–518.
- Morgan, David. The Devious Dr. Franklin, Colonial Agent: Benjamin Franklin's Years in London. Macon, Georgia: Mercer University Press, 1999.
- Reid, John Phillip. Constitutional History of the American Revolution, III: The Authority to Legislate. Madison: University of Wisconsin Press, 1991. ISBN 0-299-13070-3.
- Sosin, Jack M. "Imperial Regulation of Colonial Paper Money, 1764–1773". Pennsylvania Magazine of History and Biography, Volume 88, Number 2 (April 1964), 174–98.
- Walton, Gary M., and Hugh Rockoff. History of the American Economy. 11th ed. Mason, OH: South-Western/Cengage Learning, 2010.
- Ward, Harry M. "Review: Money and Politics in America, 1755–1775: A Study in the Currency Act of 1764 and the Political Economy of Revolution." The Journal of Southern History 40.3 (1974): 460–462.
