= Early American currency =

Money in the English/British American colonies and the pre-1789 United States

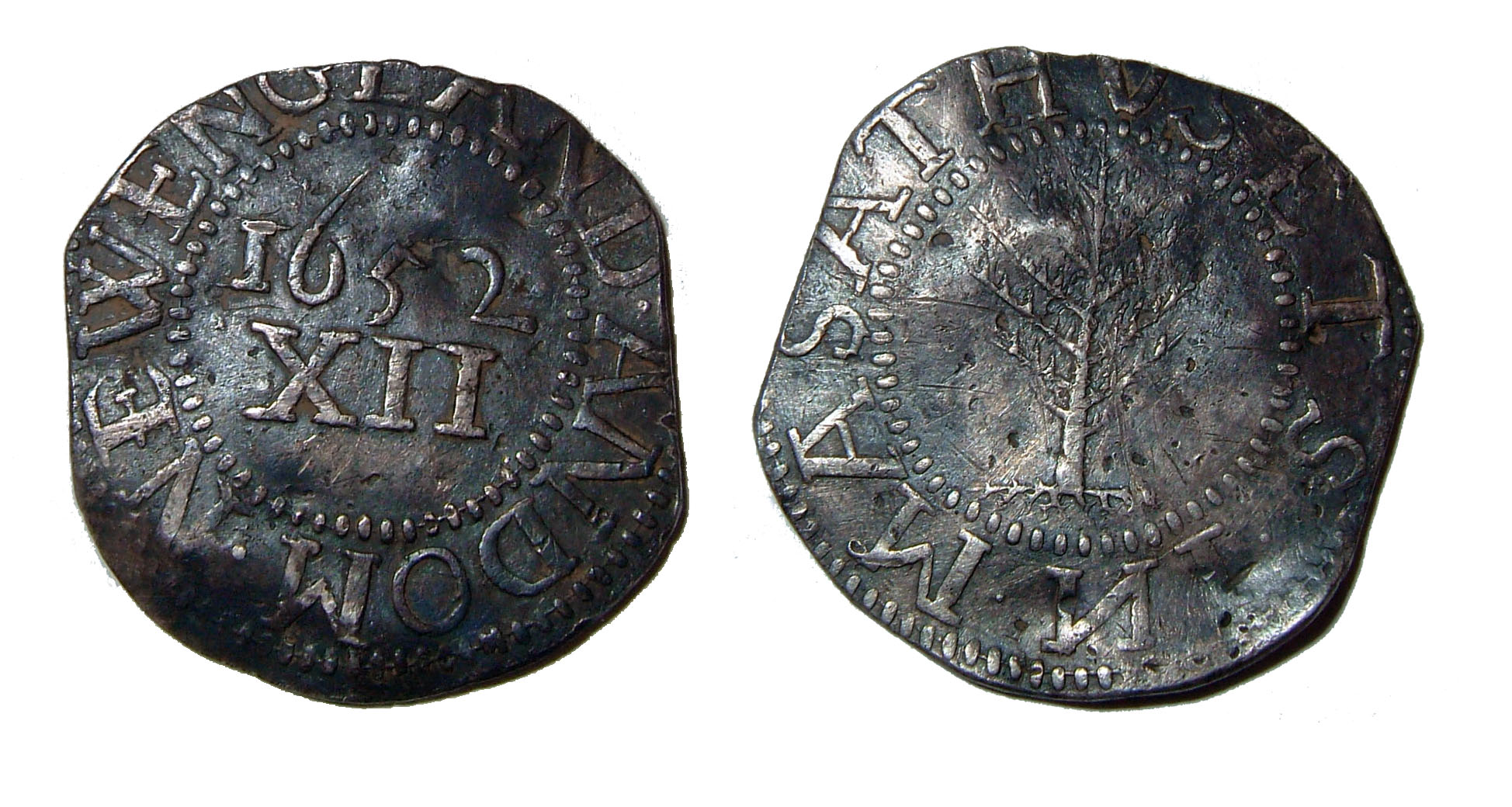
1652 pine tree shilling

Early American currency went through several stages of development during the colonial and post-Revolutionary history of United States. John Hull was authorized by the Massachusetts legislature to make the earliest coinage of the colony (the willow, the oak, and the pine tree shilling) in 1652.

Because few coins were minted in the Thirteen Colonies, which later became the United Colonies and then the United States, foreign coins like the Spanish dollar were widely circulated. Colonial governments, at times, issued paper money to facilitate economic activities. The Parliament of Great Britain passed currency acts in 1751, 1764, and 1773 to regulate colonial paper money.

During the American Revolutionary War, the colonies became independent states. No longer subject to monetary regulations of the British Parliament, the states began to issue paper money to pay for military expenses. The Continental Congress also issued paper money during the revolution—known as continental currency—to fund the war effort. The unchecked printing of fiat money by state and continental governments, driven by the demands of war, led to rampant inflation and the phrase "not worth a continental," as the currency rapidly lost value. By the end of the war, these paper notes became effectively worthless. Additionally, British counterfeiting teams contributed further to the decreased value. By its conclusion, only a few counterfeiters had been caught and preemptively hanged, for the crime. The failure of the continental currency underscored the risks of fiat money, prompting the United States to adopt a bimetallic standard of gold and silver under the Coinage Act of 1792 to ensure a stable and trusted monetary system.

== Colonial currency ==
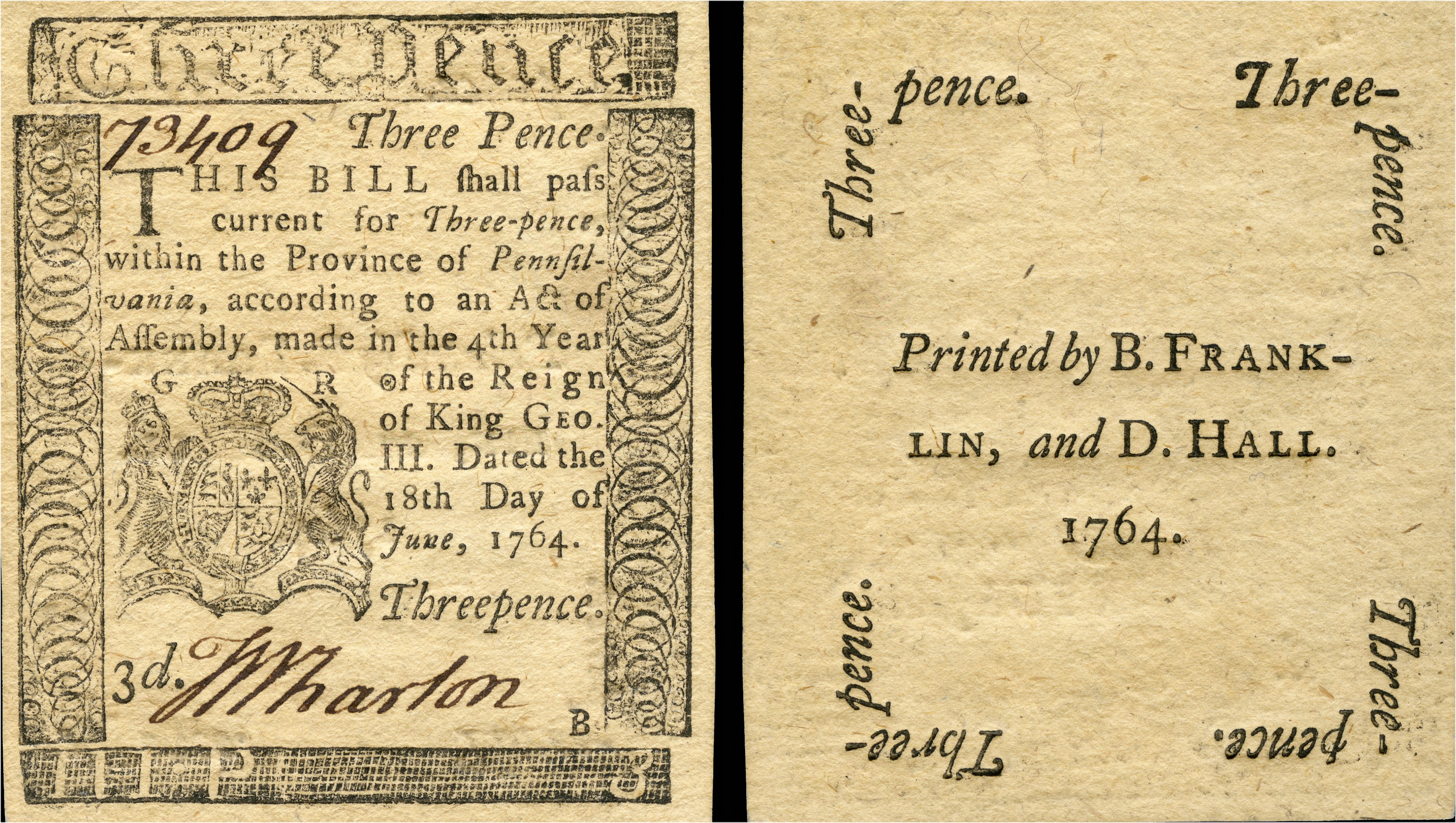
Obverse and reverse of a three pence note of paper currency issued by the Province of Pennsylvania and printed by Benjamin Franklin and David Hall in 1764.

There were three general types of money in the colonies of British America: the specie (coins), printed paper money and trade-based commodity money. Commodity money was used when cash (coins and paper money) were scarce. Commodities such as tobacco, beaver skins, and wampum, served as money at various times in many locations.

Cash in the colonies was denominated in pounds, shillings, and pence. The value of each denomination varied from colony to colony; a Massachusetts pound, for example, was not equivalent to a Pennsylvania pound. All colonial pounds were of less value than the British pound sterling. The coins in circulation during the colonial era were, most often, of Spanish and Portuguese origin. For most of the 17th and 18th centuries, the Spanish dollar was one of the few widely accepted denominations by the people, which resulted in it serving as the colonists' interim currency. The prevalence of the Spanish dollar throughout the colonies led to the money of the United States being denominated in dollars, rather than pounds.

One by one, colonies began to issue their own paper money to serve as a convenient medium of exchange. On December 10, 1690, the Province of Massachusetts Bay created "the first authorized paper money issued by any government in the Western World". This paper money was issued to pay for a military expedition during King William's War. Other colonies followed the example of Massachusetts Bay by issuing their own paper currency in subsequent military conflicts.

The oldest surviving bill bears the date "February 3, 1690" and was for 20 Massachusetts shillings, equivalent to one pound.

However, as the colonies began printing their own money, location-based socio-economic issues soon followed. Most of these concerns were rooted in each colony having different values of the dollar, confusing any inter-colony transactions. By the time Parliament decided to prohibit the printing of paper money in the colonies, their hired counterfeiters were able to take advantage of the common people, widening the gaps between socioeconomic classes.

The paper bills issued by the colonies were known as "bills of credit". Bills of credit could not be exchanged for a fixed amount of gold or silver coins upon demand, but were redeemable at a time specified in the future. Bills of credit were usually issued by colonial governments to pay debts. The governments would then retire the currency by accepting the bills for payment of taxes. When colonial governments issued too many bills of credit or failed to tax them out of circulation, inflation resulted. This happened especially in New England and the southern colonies, which, unlike the Middle Colonies, were frequently at war. Pennsylvania, however, was responsible in not issuing too much currency, offering an example of a successful government-managed monetary system. Pennsylvania's paper currency, secured by land, generally maintained its value against gold from 1723 until the revolution broke out in 1775.

This depreciation of colonial currency was harmful to creditors in Great Britain when colonists paid their debts with money that had lost value. The British parliament passed several currency acts to regulate the paper money issued by the colonies. The Currency Act 1751 restricted the issue of paper money in New England. It allowed the existing bills to be used as legal tender for public debts (i.e. paying taxes), but disallowed their use for private debts (e.g. for paying merchants). In 1776, Scottish economist Adam Smith criticized colonial bills of credit in his most famous work, The Wealth of Nations.

Another act, the Currency Act 1764, extended the restrictions to the colonies south of New England. Unlike the earlier act, this act did not prohibit the colonies in question from issuing paper money but it forbade them to designate their currency as legal tender for public or private debts. That prohibition created tension between the colonies and the mother country and has sometimes been seen as a contributing factor in the coming of the American Revolution. After much lobbying, Parliament amended the act in 1773, permitting the colonies to issue paper currency as legal tender for public debts. Shortly thereafter, some colonies once again began issuing paper money. When the American Revolutionary War began in 1775, all of the rebel colonies, soon to be independent states, issued paper money to pay for military expenses.

=== Thirteen Colony set of United States colonial currency ===
The Thirteen Colony set of colonial currency below is from the National Numismatic Collection at the Smithsonian Institution. Examples were selected based on the notability of the signers, followed by issue date and condition. The initial selection criteria for notability was drawn from a list of currency signers who were also known to have attended the 1765 Stamp Act Congress or signed the United States Declaration of Independence, Articles of Confederation, or the United States Constitution. (Note: Visually attractive and early examples were digitized and additional signer research was conducted later.)

Complete 13-colony set of United States Colonial currency (Note: Obverse and reverse images have been prepared separately for table preparation purposes. Some of the notes obverse-reverse are not on the same orientation which would make single images containing both distracting.)
Colony	Value	Date	Issue	First (Note: Date of the first issue of paper currency for each of the colonies)	Note (obv)	Note (rev)	Signatures
Connecticut	40s (£2)	1775-01-02	£15,000	1709	Connecticut colonial currency, 40 shillings, 1775 (obverse)	Connecticut colonial currency, 40 shillings, 1775 (reverse)	Elisha Williams, Thomas Seymour, Benjamin Payne (Note: Williams, Seymour, and Payne (among others) were appointed to a committee to print and sign currency for the Colony of Connecticut in the amount of 50,000 pounds.)
Delaware	4s	1776-01-01	£30,000	1723	Delaware colonial currency, 4 shillings, 1776 (obverse)	Delaware colonial currency, 4 shillings, 1776 (reverse)	John McKinly, Thomas Collins, Boaz Manlove
Georgia	$40	1778-05-04	£150,000 (Note: Newman (2008) indicates the total issue in Pound sterling despite the currency issue in dollars.)	1735	Georgia colonial currency, 40 dollars, 1778 (obverse)	Georgia colonial currency, 40 dollars, 1778 (reverse)	Charles Kent, William Few, Thomas Netherclift, William O’Bryen, (Note: O’Bryen, Treasurer of Georgia, was elected to the Continental Congress but did not attend.); Nehemiah Wade
Maryland	$1	1770-03-01	$318,000	1733	Maryland colonial currency, 1 dollar, 1770 (obverse)	Maryland colonial currency, 1 dollar, 1770 (reverse)	John Clapham, Robert Couden (Note: Couden served as Mayor of Annapolis from 1785–86 and 1790–91.)
Massachusetts	2s	1741-05-01	£50,000	1690	Massachusetts colonial currency, 2 shilling, 1741 (obverse)	Massachusetts colonial currency, 2 shilling, 1741 (reverse)	Robert Choate, Jonathan Hale, John Brown, Edward Eveleth
New Hampshire	$1	1780-04-29	$145,000	1709	New Hampshire colonial currency, 1 dollar, 1780 (obverse)	New Hampshire colonial currency, 1 dollar, 1780 (reverse)	James McClure, Ephraim Robinson, Joseph Pearson, (Note: Act authorizing Ephraim Robinson and Joseph Pearson to countersign New Hampshire currency.); John Taylor Gilman (rev)
New Jersey	12s	1776-03-25	£100,000	1709	New Jersey colonial currency, 12 shilling, 1776 (obverse)	New Jersey colonial currency, 12 shilling, 1776 (reverse)	Robert Smith, John Hart, John Stevens Jr.
New York	2s	1775-08-02	£2,500	1709	New York colonial currency, 2 shilling, 1775 (obverse)	New York colonial currency, 2 shilling, 1775 (reverse)	John Cruger Jr., William Waddell (Note: Waddell was a New York City Alderman (1773–77) with the authority to sign currency issued to fund the "water works" under construction near Broadway and Chambers streets.)
North Carolina	£3	1729-11-27	£40,000	1712	North Carolina colonial currency, 3 pounds sterling, 1729 (obverse)	North Carolina colonial currency, 3 pounds sterling, 1729 (reverse)	William Downing, (Note: Downing served as Speaker of the House of Burgesses from 1735 to 1739.); John Lovick, (Note: Lovick was a member of the House of Burgesses.); Edward Moseley, Cullen Pollock, (Note: Pollock was a member of the House of Burgesses.); Thomas Swann (Note: Swann served as Speaker of the House of Burgesses in 1729.)
Pennsylvania	20s (£1)	1771-03-20	£15,000	1723	Pennsylvania colonial currency, 20 shilling, 1771 (obverse)	Pennsylvania colonial currency, 20 shilling, 1771 (reverse)	Francis Hopkinson, Robert Strettell Jones, William Fisher (Note: Hopkinson, Jones, and Fisher authorized to sign Pennsylvania currency.)
Rhode Island	$1	1780-07-02	£39,000	1710	Rhode Island colonial currency, 1 dollar, 1780 (obverse)	Rhode Island colonial currency, 1 dollar, 1780 (reverse)	Caleb Harris, Metcalf Bowler, (Note: Act passed June 1780 authorizing Harris and Bowler to sign Rhode Island currency.); Jonathan Arnold
South Carolina	$60	1779-02-08	$1,000,000	1703	South Carolina colonial currency, 60 dollars, 1779 (obverse)	South Carolina colonial currency, 60 dollars, 1779 (reverse)	John Scott, John Smyth, Plowden Weston (Note: Scott, Smyth, and Weston (among others) were appointed commissioners with the authority to print and sign one million dollars of South Carolina currency.)
Virginia	£3	1773-03-04	£36,384	1755	Virginia colonial currency, 3 pounds sterling, 1773 (obverse)	Virginia colonial currency, 3 pounds sterling, 1773 (reverse)	Peyton Randolph, John Blair Jr., Robert Carter Nicholas Sr.(rev)

== Continental currency ==
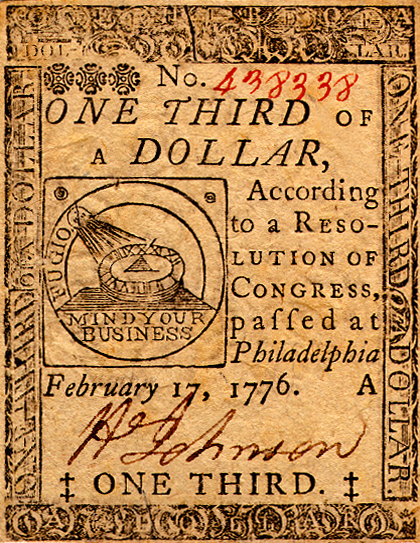
Continental One Third Dollar Note (obverse)

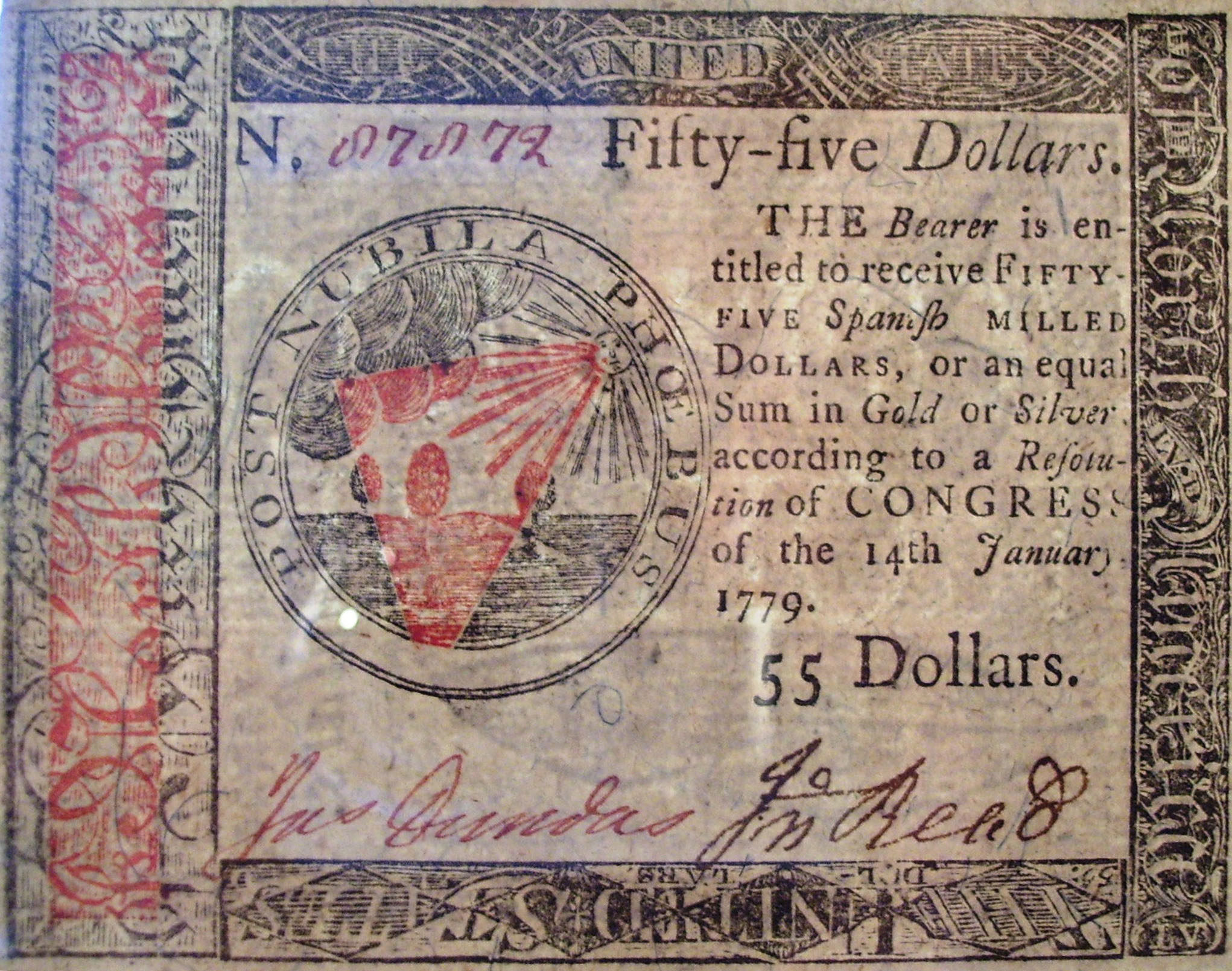
A fifty-five dollar Continental issued in 1779

After the American Revolutionary War began in 1775, the Continental Congress began issuing paper money known as Continental currency, or Continentals. Continental currency was denominated in dollars from $1/6 to $80, including many odd denominations in between. During the Revolution, Congress issued $199,990,000 in Continental currency.

The Continental Currency dollar was valued relative to the states' currencies at the following rates:

- 5 shillings – Georgia
- 6 shillings – Connecticut, Massachusetts, New Hampshire, Rhode Island, Virginia
- 7 1/2 shillings – Delaware, Maryland, New Jersey, Pennsylvania
- 8 shillings – New York, North Carolina
- 32 1/2 shillings – South Carolina

Continental currency depreciated badly during the war, giving rise to the famous phrase "not worth a continental". A primary problem was that monetary policy was not coordinated between Congress and the states, which continued to issue bills of credit. "Some think that the rebel bills depreciated because people lost confidence in them or because they were not backed by tangible assets", writes financial historian Robert E. Wright. "Not so. There were simply too many of them." Congress and the states lacked the will or the means to retire the bills from circulation through taxation or the sale of bonds.

Another issue was that the British successfully waged economic warfare by counterfeiting Continentals on a large scale. Benjamin Franklin later wrote:

The artists they employed performed so well that immense quantities of these counterfeits which issued from the British government in New York, were circulated among the inhabitants of all the states, before the fraud was detected. This operated significantly in depreciating the whole mass.

By the end of 1778, Continentals retained from 1/5 to 1/7 of their face value. By 1780, the bills were worth 1/40 of their face value. Congress attempted to reform the currency by removing the old bills from circulation and issuing new ones, without success. By May 1781, Continentals had become so worthless that they ceased to circulate as money. Franklin noted that the depreciation of the currency had, in effect, acted as a tax to pay for the war.

For this reason, some Quakers, whose pacifism did not permit them to pay war taxes, also refused to use Continentals, and at least one Yearly Meeting formally forbade its members to use the notes. In the 1790s, after the ratification of the United States Constitution, Continentals could be exchanged for treasury bonds at 1% of face value.

After the collapse of Continental currency, Congress appointed Robert Morris to be Superintendent of Finance of the United States. Morris advocated the creation of the first financial institution chartered by the United States, the Bank of North America, in 1782. The bank was funded in part by bullion coins loaned to the United States by France. Morris helped finance the final stages of the war by issuing notes in his name, backed by his personal line of credit, which was further backed by a French loan of $450,000 in silver coins. The Bank of North America also issued notes convertible into gold or silver. Morris also presided over the creation of the first mint operated by the U.S. government, which struck the first coins of the United States, the Nova Constellatio patterns of 1783.

The painful experience of the runaway inflation and collapse of the Continental dollar prompted the delegates to the Constitutional Convention to include the gold and silver clause into the United States Constitution so that the individual states could not issue bills of credit or "make any Thing but gold and silver Coin a Tender in Payment of Debts". However, in Juilliard v. Greenman the Supreme Court of the United States settled an ongoing and very heated debate on whether this restriction of issuing bills of credit was also extended to the Federal government:

By the constitution of the United States, the several states are prohibited from coining money, emitting bills of credit, or making anything but gold and silver coin a tender in payment of debts. But no intention can be inferred from this to deny to congress either of these powers.

== See also ==
- Criticism of the Federal Reserve
- Economic history of the United States
- Federal Reserve Note
- Gold standard
- History of economic thought
- History of the United States dollar
- Hyperinflation
- Monetary policy
- Money creation
- United States dollar
- Vermont copper

== Bibliography ==
- Allen, Larry (2009). The Encyclopedia of Money (2nd ed.). Santa Barbara, California: ABC-CLIO. ISBN 978-1-59884-251-7.
- Flynn, David (March 16, 2008). "Credit in the Colonial American Economy". In Whaples, Robert (ed.). EH.Net Encyclopedia.

Grubb, Farley (March 2008). "The Continental Dollar: How Much Was Really Issued?". The Journal of Economic History. 68 (1). The Economic History Association: 283–291. doi:10.1017/S0022050708000090.

- Michener, Ron (June 8, 2003). "Money in the American Colonies". In Whaples, Robert (ed.). EH.Net Encyclopedia.
- Newman, Eric P. (1990). The Early Paper Money of America (3rd ed.). Iola, Wisconsin: Krause Publications. ISBN 0-87341-120-X.
- Newman, Eric P. (2008). The Early Paper Money of America (5th ed.). Iola, Wisconsin: Krause Publications. ISBN 978-0-89689-326-9.
- Wright, Robert E. (2008). One Nation Under Debt: Hamilton, Jefferson, and the History of What We Owe. New York: McGraw-Hill. ISBN 978-0-07-154393-4.
