= Virginia pound =

Currency of Virginia until 1793

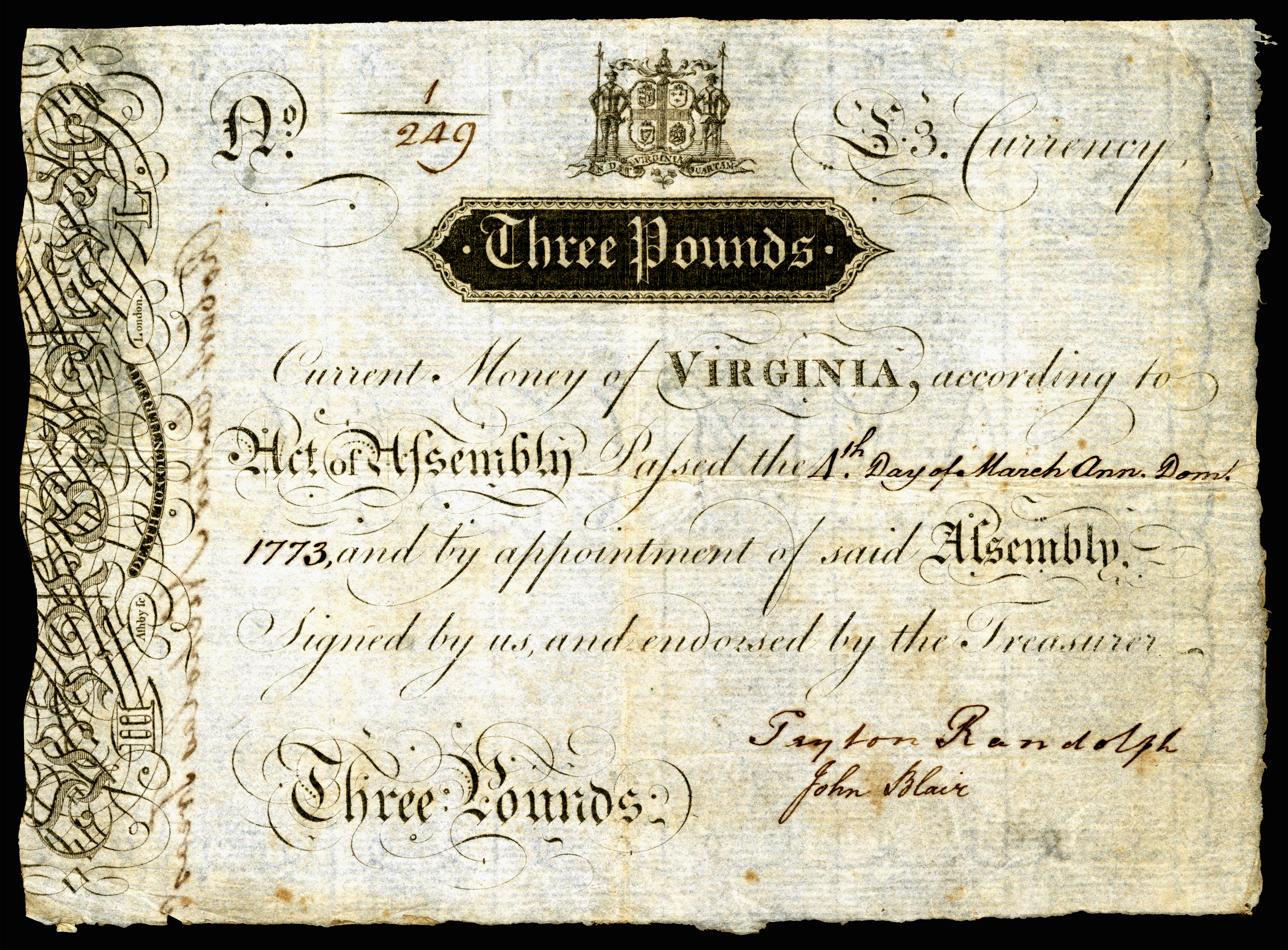
A £3 Colonial banknote from the Colony of Virginia. Signed by Peyton Randolph and John Blair Jr.

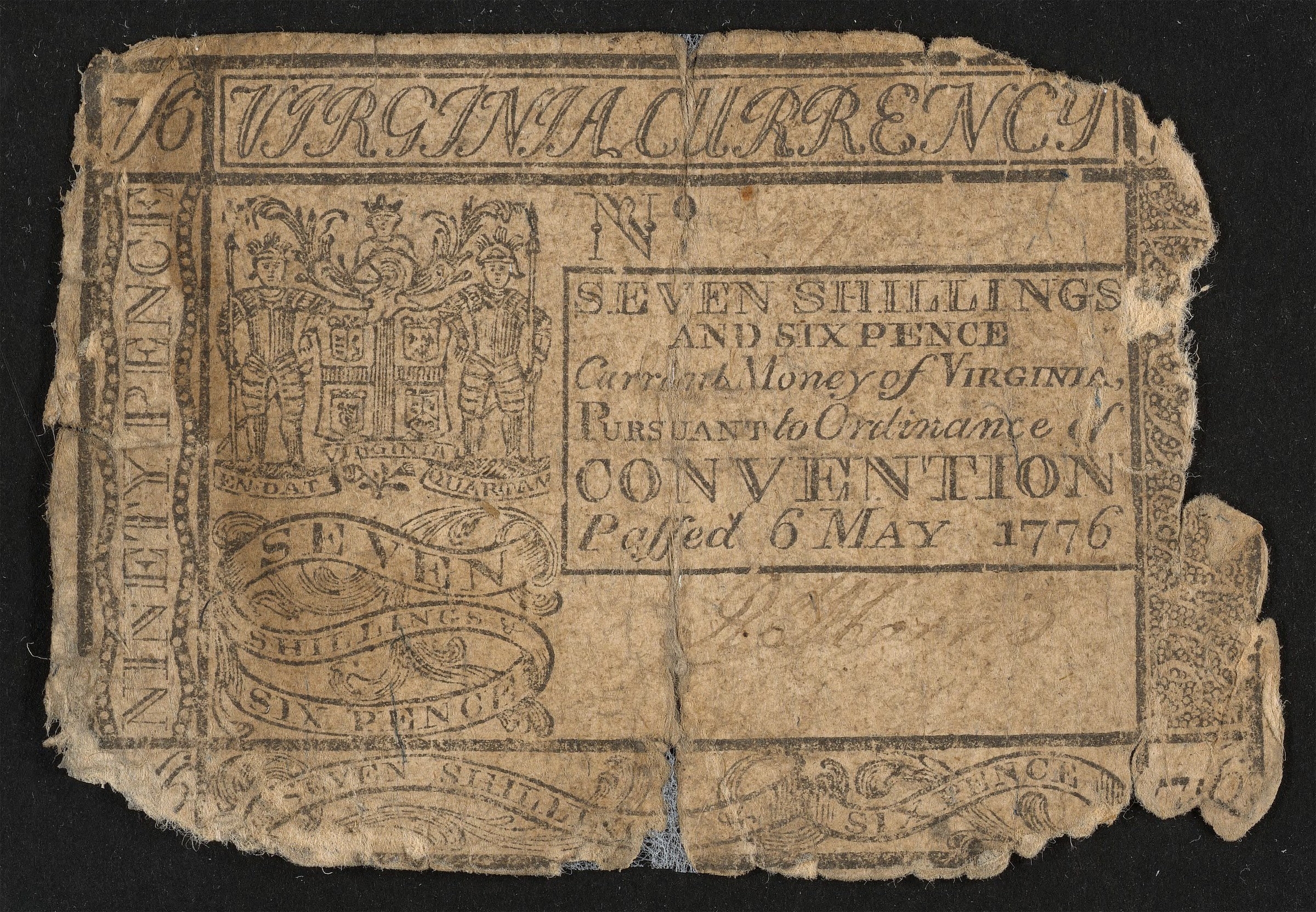
A 1776 banknote issued by Virginia worth seven shillings and six pence.

The pound was the currency of Virginia until 1793. Initially, sterling coin circulated along with foreign currencies, supplemented from 1755 by local paper money. Although these notes were denominated in £sd, they were worth less than sterling, so 1 Virginia shilling was equal to 9d sterling.

== Colonial legislation ==
In 1645 the legislature of the Colony of Virginia prohibited barter, and valued the Spanish dollar or piece of eight at 6/–. The 1655 legislature officially devalued the Spanish dollar to 5/-.

== Virginia coinage ==
The first "official" coinage in British North America was issued by the colony of Virginia in 1775, although they were dated 1773. The reason was that the Virginia House of Burgesses had been requesting the coinage for several years and King George III finally consented in that year.

Five tons of coins were sent to the colony on the clipper ship Virginia and most of the coins were distributed just before the breakout of the American Revolution in April 1775. They are considered to be the most affordable Colonial American coinage. It was valued more than North Carolina, and New York pounds at the time.

== Continental currency ==
The State of Virginia issued Continental currency denominated in £sd and Spanish dollars, with 1 dollar = 6/–. The continental currency was replaced by the U.S. dollar at a rate of 1000 continental dollars = 1 U.S. dollar.

== See also ==
- Early American currency
