= Westfield, West Lothian =

Coordinates: 55.932°N 3.701°W

Westfield: Scottish Gaelic: an t-Achadh Siar
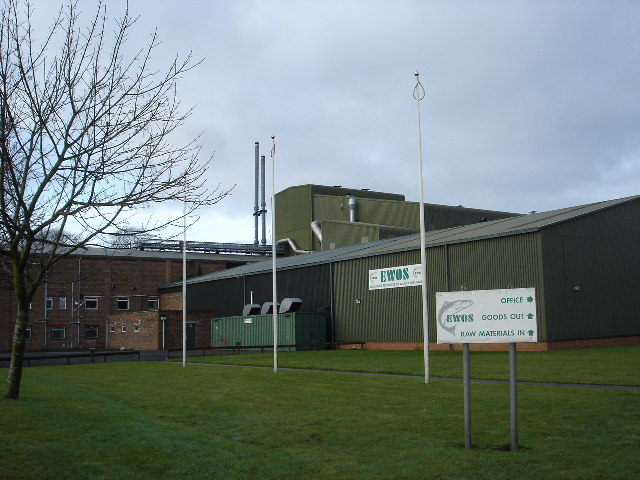
- Fish meal factory, by Westfield

- Location within West Lothian
- OS grid reference: NS937723
- Civil parish: Torphichen
- Council area: West Lothian
- Lieutenancy area: West Lothian
- Country: Scotland
- Sovereign state: United Kingdom
- Post town: BATHGATE
- Postcode district: EH48
- Dialling code: 01506
- Police: Scotland
- Fire: Scottish
- Ambulance: Scottish
- UK Parliament: Bathgate and Linlithgow
- Scottish Parliament: Linlithgow

Westfield (Scottish Gaelic: an t-Achadh Siar) is a small village of around 180 houses located in the parish of Torphichen in West Lothian, Scotland.

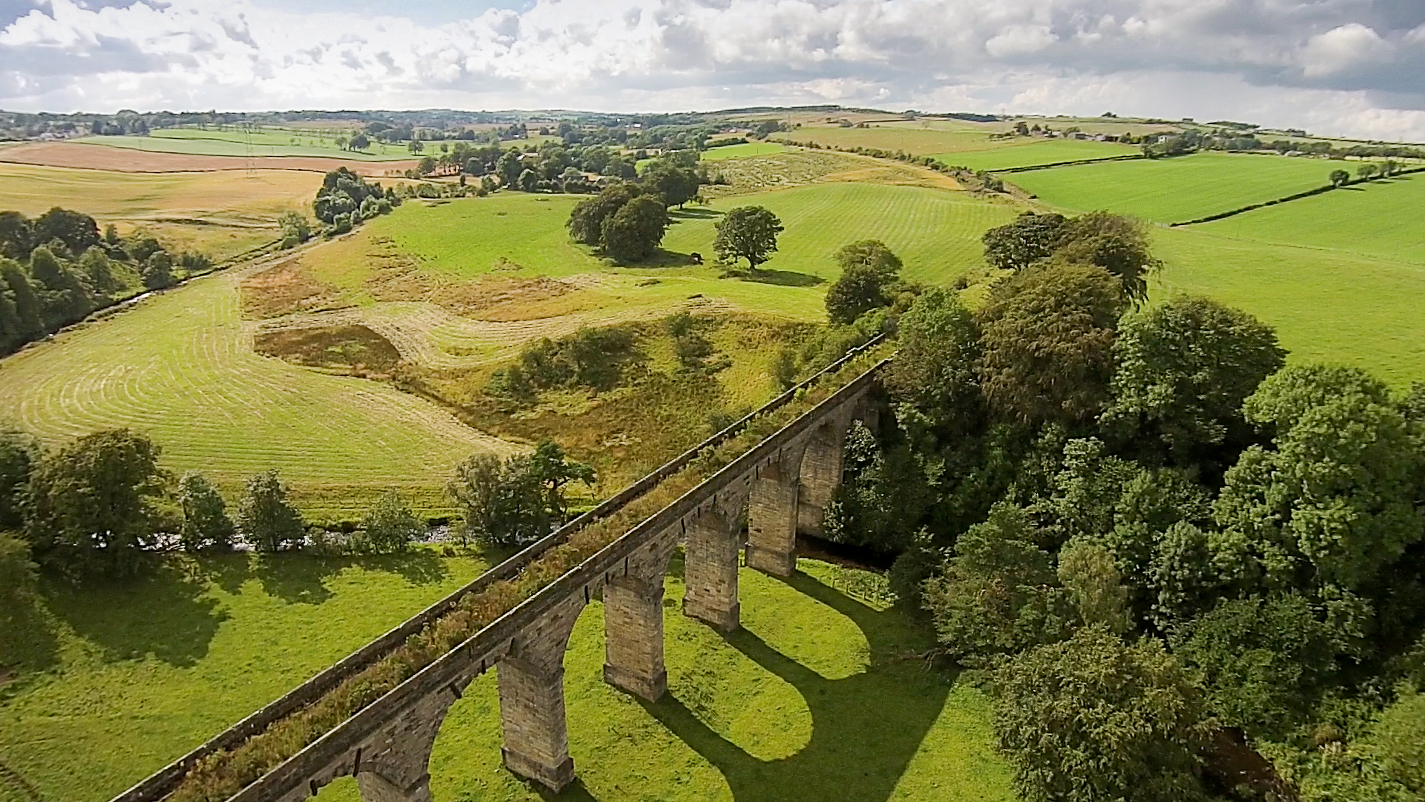
The disused railway viaduct crosses the river Avon at Westfield

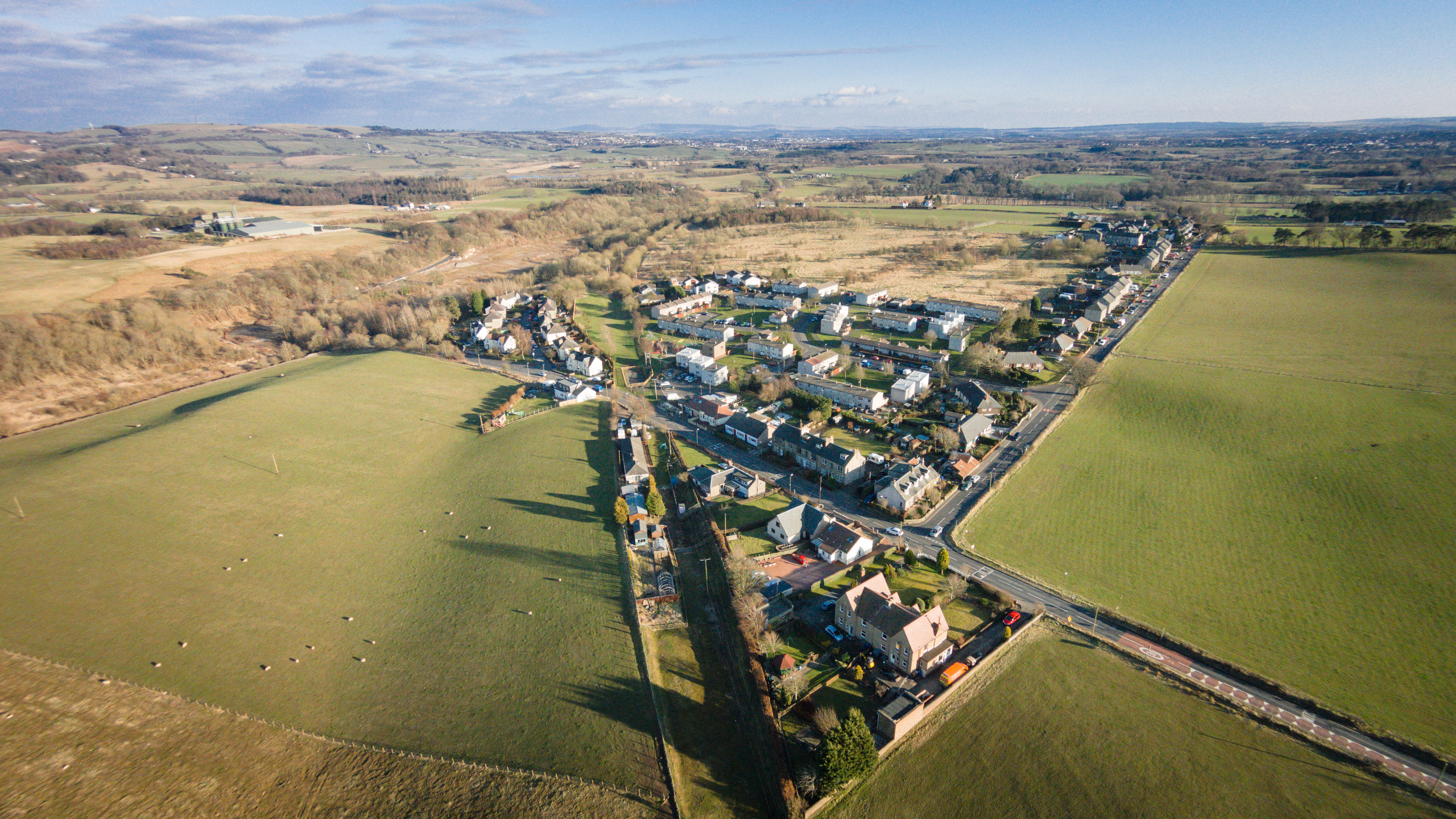
Aerial view of the village
