= New Jersey pound =

Currency of New Jersey until 1793

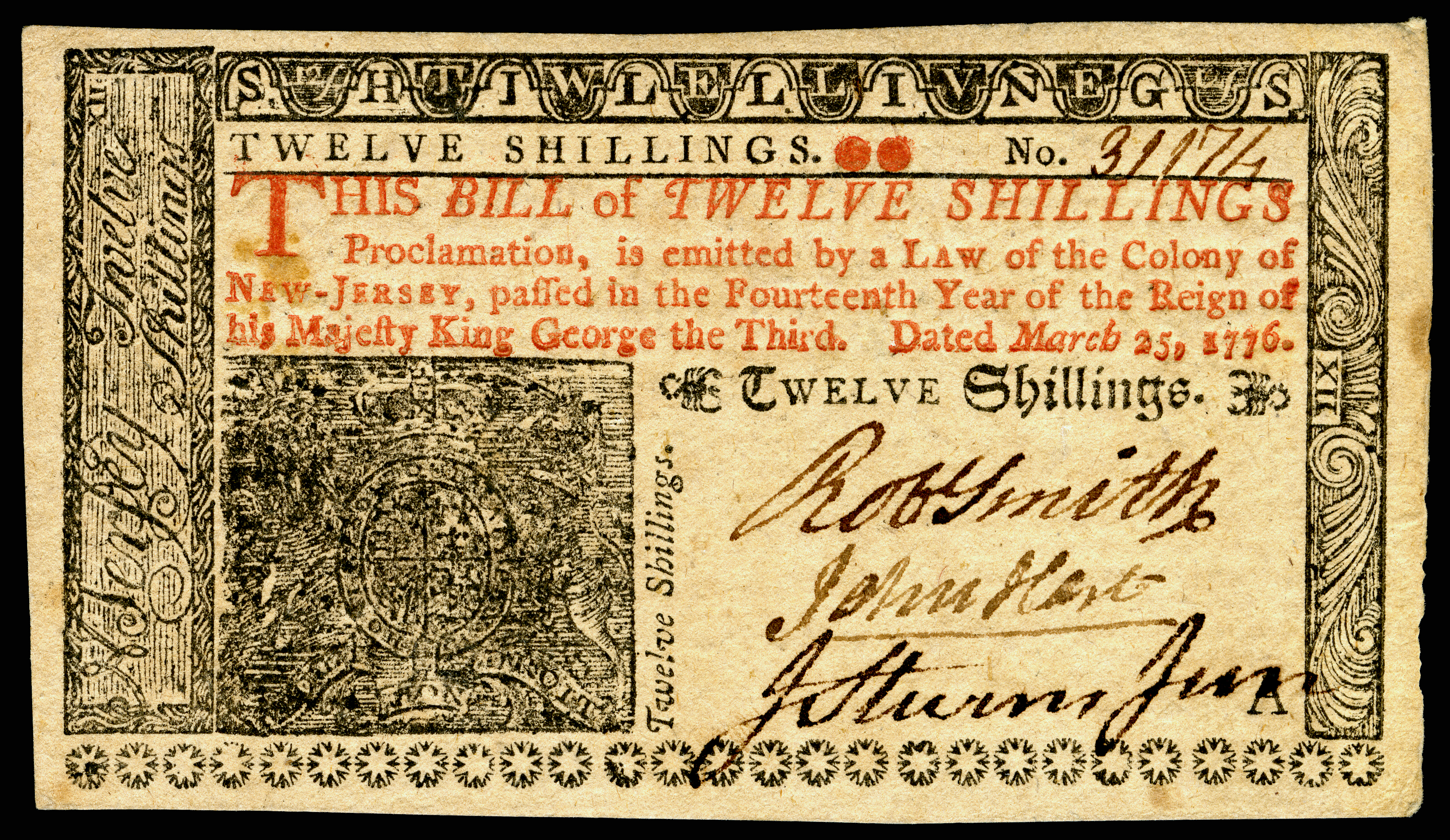
A 12/– colonial currency note from the Province of New Jersey. Signed by Robert Smith, John Hart, and John Stevens, Jr.

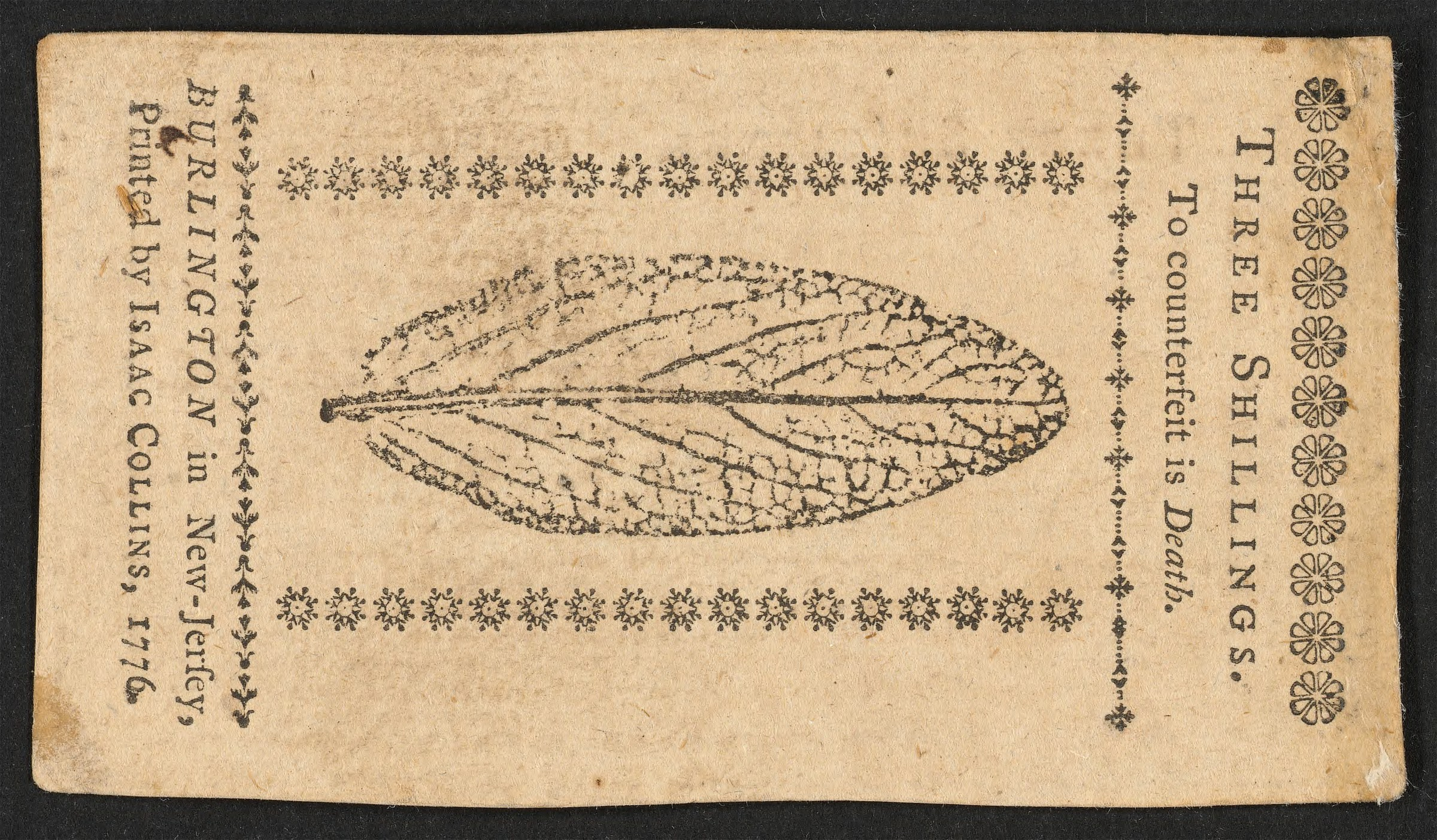
A 1776 three-shilling New Jersey bank note.

The pound was the currency of New Jersey until 1793. Initially, sterling coin and some foreign currencies circulated, supplemented from 1709 by local paper money. Although the notes were denominated in £sd, they were worth less than sterling. A proclamation of Queen Anne, issued in 1704 and legislated by parliament in 1707, standardized the value of all colonial currencies at 6 colonial shillings to a full weight Spanish dollar, which was in turn equivalent to 4s.6d. sterling. This made a colonial shilling equivalent to 9d sterling and a colonial pound equivalent to 2 troy oz 18 dwt 8 gr (1,400 grains / 90.7 grams) of silver. Currency issued at this rate was referred to as “Proclamation Money”.

The currency of colonial New Jersey consisted of bills of credit which circulated as legal tender. Each issue was inscribed with the weight of silver it was current for. The initial 1709 issue passed at the rate of 2½ ounces of silver per New Jersey pound, but issues after 1724 had inscriptions with specified the Proclamation Money rate. Although that made a Spanish milled dollar officially worth 6 New Jersey shillings, accounts from the 1750s indicate that Spanish Milled Dollars passed for 8/– in New York and adjacent parts of East New Jersey and for 7s.6d. in Pennsylvania and West New Jersey. This practice, and hence the value of New Jersey currency, remained stable up to the revolution and the reasons for its stability have been widely studied. Redemption theories attribute its stability to the fact that (a) each issue of currency had a fixed redemption date and (b) the colonial assembly consistently redeemed its currency at face value with taxes which were clearly feasible to collect. For issues of currency which New Jersey used to finance Queen Anne's War and the French and Indian War, taxes in equal amounts were voted on and approved with the issue of currency. Thus, the paper money provided “currency finance” for the war effort in anticipation of future tax income. In practice, theses issues were retired by citizens who used them to pay taxes. New Jersey made additional issues of currency to make loans to citizens for the purchase of land, which served as collateral for the loans and hence as backing for the bills. Here, the currency was retired by debtors using it to repay the loans. A competing theory attributes the stability of New Jersey’s currency to its circulation alongside precious metal coins or their equivalents. The agreement of merchants to accept it at the rate of 7s.6d. for a Spanish Milled Dollar gave it “de facto convertibility” and hence stability.

The State of New Jersey issued Continental currency denominated in £sd and Spanish dollars, with $1 = 7/6. Copper coins were also issued in the mid-1780s, bearing the Latin name of the state, Nova Cæsarea. The continental currency was later replaced by the U.S. dollar at the rate of $1,000 continental = US$1.
