= North Carolina pound =

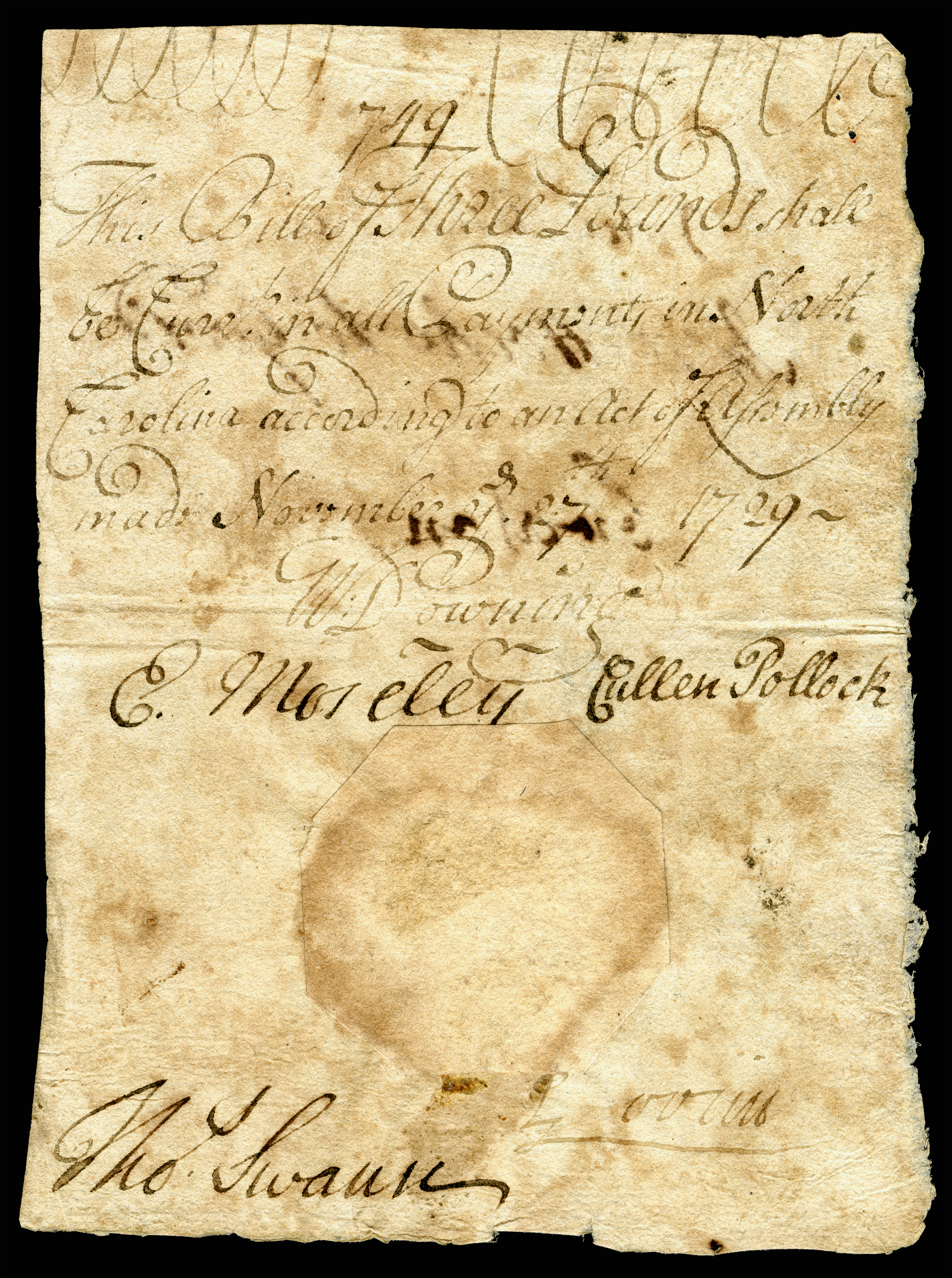
North Carolina £3 banknote (obverse)
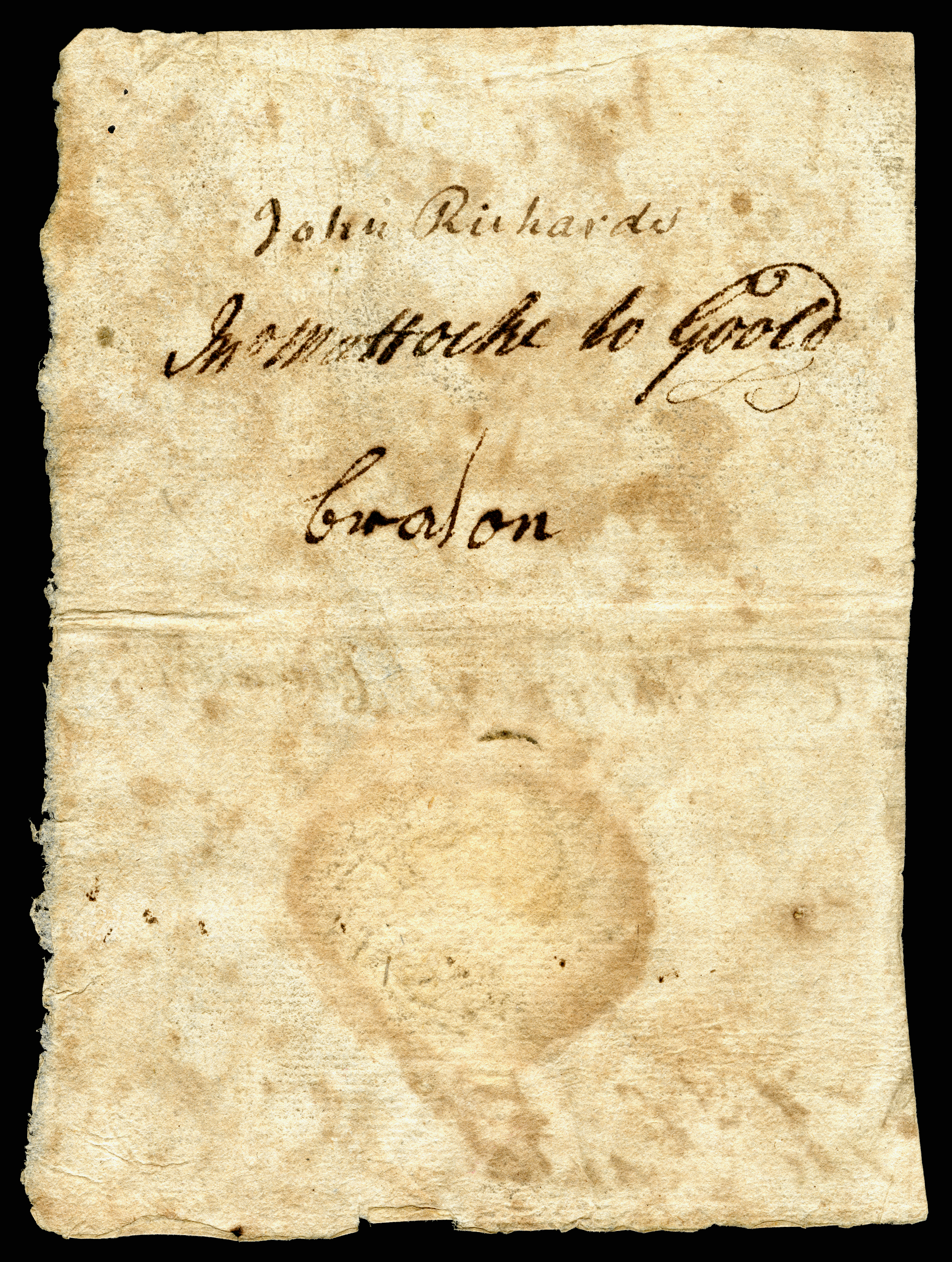
North Carolina £3 banknote (reverse)

Units of account
- Plural: pounds
- Symbol: £

Denominations
- Banknotes
- Freq. used: £1, £2, £5
- Rarely used: £3
- Coins: None

Demographics
- User(s): Province of North Carolina

Issuance
- Central bank: North Carolina Treasury

Valuation
- Pegged with: sterling at £1 N.C. = 15/- STG (£0.75 STG)

The pound (symbol: £) was the currency of North Carolina until 1793. Initially, sterling coin circulated, supplemented from 1709 by the introduction of colonial currency denominated in pounds, shillings and pence in 1712. The North Carolina currency was worth less than sterling, with a rating of 1 North Carolina shilling = 9 pence sterling (or 1 North Carolina pound to 15 shillings sterling). The first issue of paper money was known as "Old Tenor" money. In 1748, "New Tenor" paper money was introduced, worth 7 1/2 times the Old Tenor notes.

The State of North Carolina issued continental currency denominated in £sd and Spanish dollars at the York rating of 1 dollar = 8 shillings. The continental currency was replaced by the U.S. dollar at a rate of 1000 continental dollars = 1 U.S. dollar.
