= York rating =

The York rating was a valuation of the Spanish dollar in the £sd accounting system. It set the dollar equal to 8 shillings (1 real = 1 shilling). The rating was named after the colony of New York where it was adopted (see New York pound). It was also used in Upper Canada by United Empire Loyalists following the American War of Independence (see Canadian dollar).
