= Pennsylvania pound =

Currency of Pennsylvania until 1793

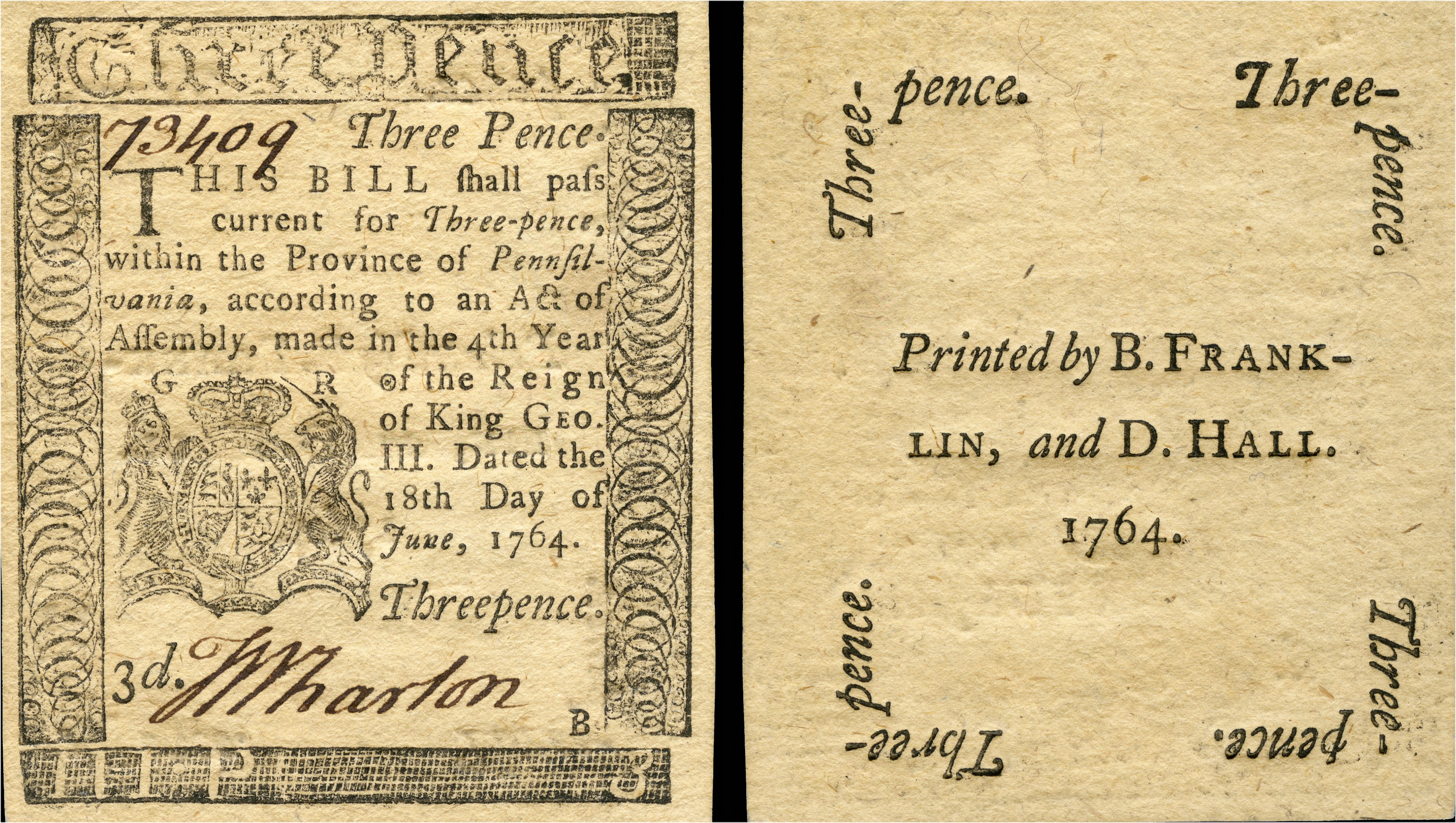
Obverse and reverse of a 3d note of paper currency issued by the Province of Pennsylvania and printed by Benjamin Franklin and David Hall in 1764.

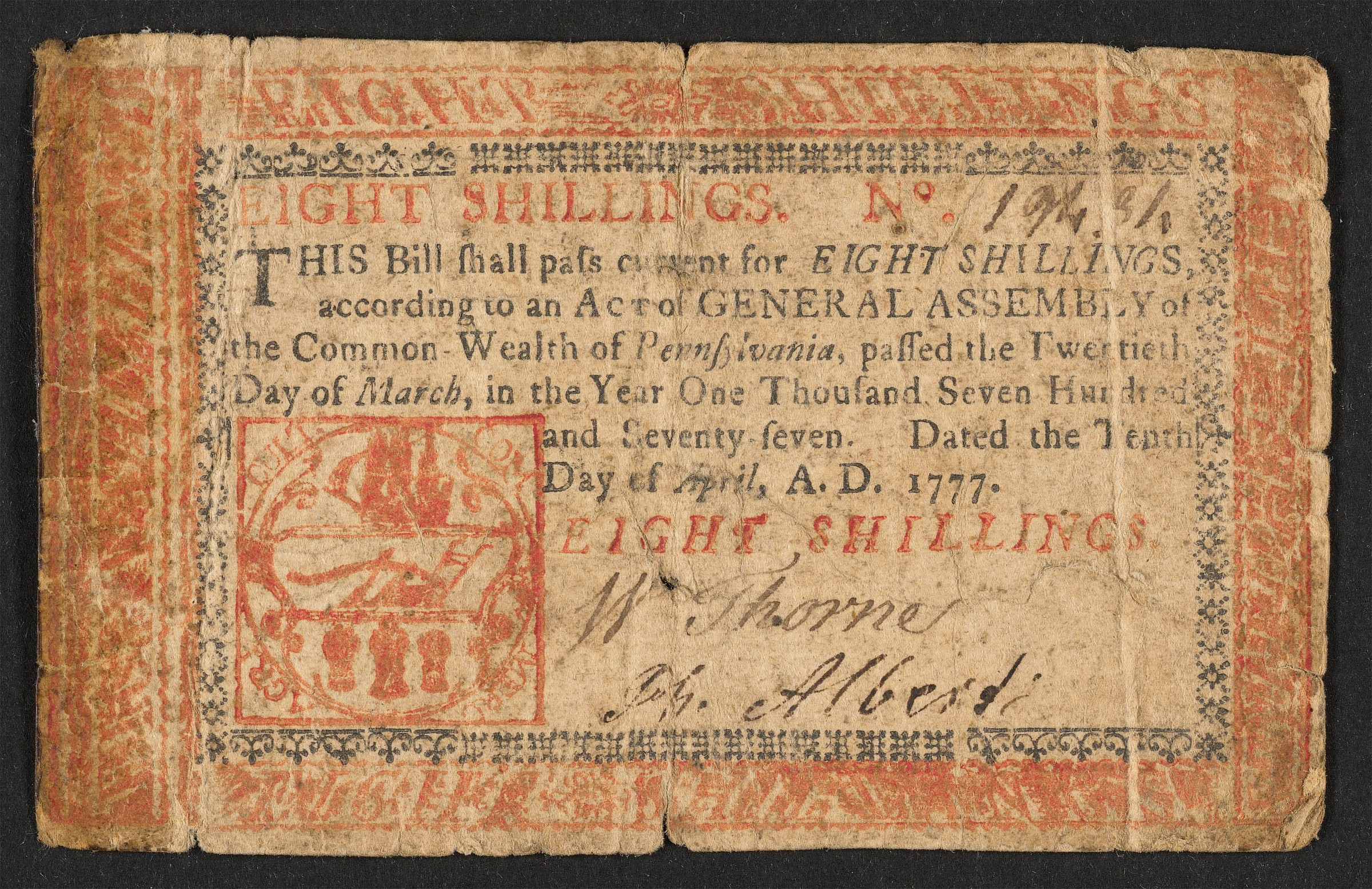
A 8s Pennsylvania note issued in 1777.

The pound was the currency of Pennsylvania until 1793. It was created as a response to the global economic downturn caused by the collapse of the South Sea Company. Initially, sterling and certain foreign coins circulated, supplemented from 1723 by local paper money, colonial scrip. Although these notes were denominated in £sd, they were worth less than sterling, with 1 Pennsylvanian shilling equalling 9d sterling.

The Pennsylvania Pound was first conceived by Francis Rawle, who can be rightly called The Father of the Pennsylvania Pound.

In March 1723, it issued Colonial Scrip, paper bills of credit to the amount of $60,000, made them a legal tender in all payments on pain of confiscating the debt or forfeiting the commodity, imposed sufficient penalties on all persons who presumed to make any bargain or sale on cheaper terms in case of being paid in gold or silver, and provided for the gradual reduction of the bills by enacting that one-eighth of the principal, as well as the whole interest, should be paid annually. Pennsylvania made no loans but on land security or plate deposited in the loan office, and obliged borrowers to pay 5% for the sums they took up. The scheme worked so well that, in the latter end of the year, the government emitted bills to the amount of $150,000 on the same terms. In 1729 there was a new emission of $150,000 to be reduced one-sixteenth a year. Pennsylvania was one of the last colonies that emitted a paper currency. In 1775, the colonial "scrip" currency was replaced by Continental currency. The Commonwealth of Pennsylvania issued Continental currency denominated in £sd and Spanish dollars, with 1 dollar equalling 7 shillings and 6 pence. The continental currency was replaced by the United States dollar at a rate of 1000 continental dollars = 1 U.S. dollar in 1793.
