= South Carolina pound =

Currency of South Carolina until 1793

South Carolina pound
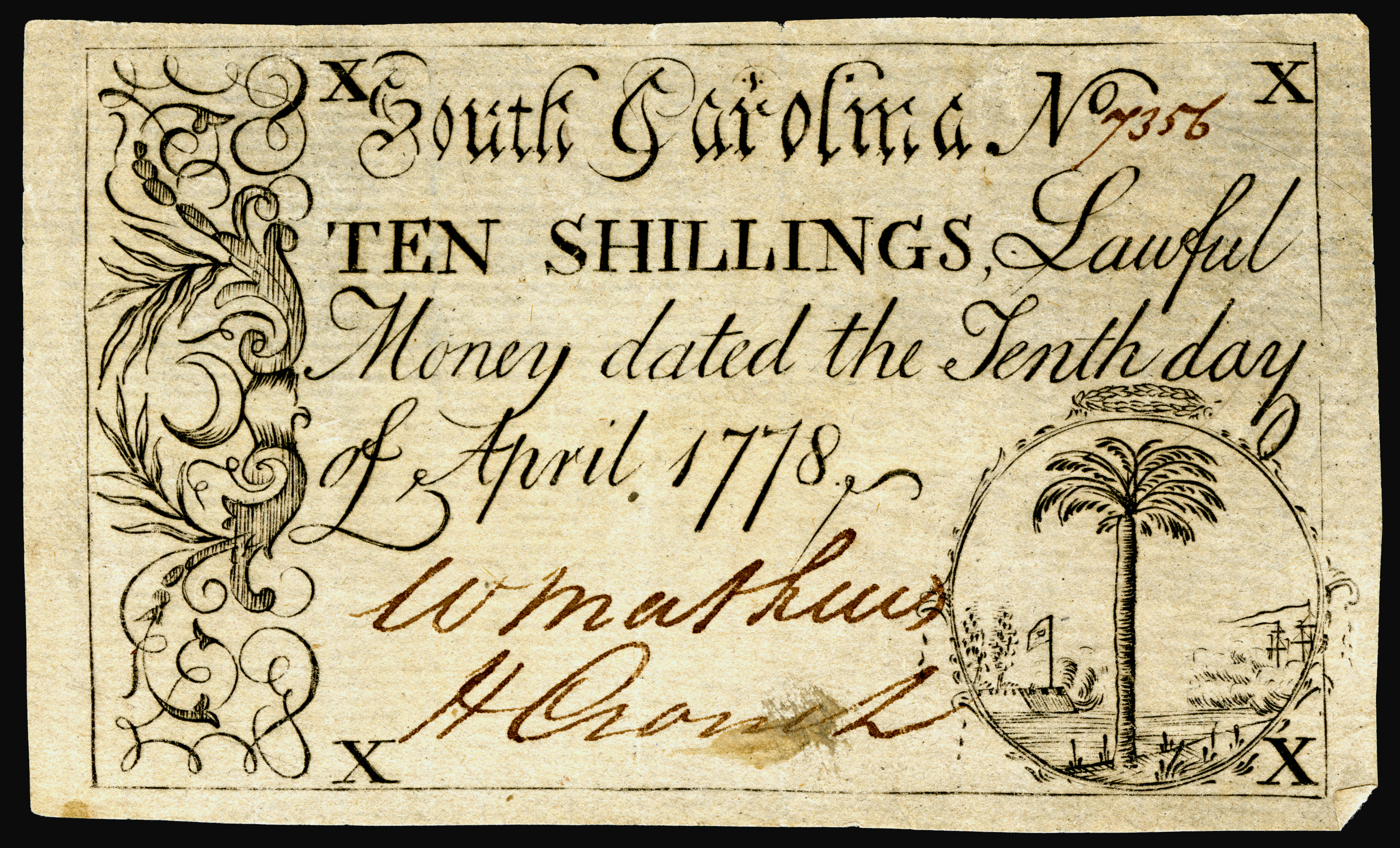
- 10/– Colonial currency from South Carolina (April 10, 1778).

Units of account

Demographics
- User(s): South Carolina

The pound was the currency of South Carolina until 1793. Initially, Pound sterling circulated, supplemented from 1703 by local paper money. Although these notes were denominated in £sd, they were worth less than sterling, with 1 South Carolina shilling = 8d sterling. The first issues were known as Proclamation Money. They were replaced by the Lawful Money issue in 1748, with 1 Lawful shilling = 4 2/3 Proclamation shillings.

The State of South Carolina issued Continental currency denominated in £sd and Spanish dollars with 1 dollar = 32 1/2 shillings (8 dollars = 13 pounds). The continental currency was replaced by the U.S. dollar at a rate of 1000 continental dollars = 1 U.S. dollar.

== Sources ==
- Newman, Eric P. (2008). The Early Paper Money of America (5th ed.). Iola, Wisconsin: Krause Publications. ISBN 0-89689-326-X.
