= Bills of credit =

Type of document similar to banknotes

Bills of credit are documents similar to banknotes issued by a government that represent a government's indebtedness to the holder. They are typically designed to circulate as currency or currency substitutes. Bills of credit are mentioned in Article One, Section 10, Clause One (also known as the Contract Clause) of the United States Constitution, where their issuance by state governments is prohibited.

Legal writers, as opposed to economic historians, incorrectly assume that the constitutional phrase "Bills of Credit" was simply a synonym for paper money, but it refers to only one, though a very important, type of paper currency.

== Usage throughout history ==
=== Use in the American Colonies (pre-1775) ===
British colonies in North America would issue bills of credit in order to deal with fiscal crises, although doing so without receiving them as revenue in like amounts would increase the money supply, resulting in price inflation and a drop in value relative to the pound sterling. The documents would circulate as if they were currency, and colonial governments would accept them as payment for debts like taxes. They were not always considered legal tender for private debts.

Colonial decisions on the issuance of bills of credit were also frequently the subject of disputes between differing factions within the colony, and with royally appointed governors. Between 1690 and 1750 the matter was regularly debated in the Province of Massachusetts Bay, where merchants and lenders stood to lose value when new bills were issued, and borrowers stood to gain, because they could repay their debts with depreciated bills. The Massachusetts bills were finally retired in 1749 when the province received a large payment in coin for its financial contributions to the 1745 Siege of Louisbourg. The Province of New Jersey issued bills of credit beginning in the 1710s, but successfully managed to avoid significant inflationary effects.

=== American Revolutionary War and Constitutional Convention (1775–1787) ===
During the American Revolutionary War the Continental Congress frequently issued bills of credit referred to as Continentals. Because of inflation they rapidly declined in value, leading to the unfavorable comparison that something was "not worth a Continental".

Article One, Section 10, Clause One prohibits the states from issuing Bills of Credit. The prohibition of states issuing Bills of Credit came in direct response to how states managed their financial policy during the era of the Articles of Confederation. While all states in theory recognized the American Continental as their official currency, in reality, nearly every state issued its own Bills of credit, which further devalued the Continental and led to its eventual collapse as a currency.

The painful experience of the runaway inflation and collapse of the Continental dollar prompted the delegates to the Constitutional Convention to include the Contract Clause into the United States Constitution, so that the individual states could not issue bills of credit or "make any Thing, but gold and silver Coin a Tender in Payment of Debts."

=== 19th century ===
The United States Government has, at numerous times throughout American History, issued Bills of Credit to utilize in place of paper currency. Most instances of this have occurred during wartime.

In 1862, the United States Department of the Treasury began to issue United States Notes as obligations of the United States. United States Notes are examples of Bills of Credit as they used to be inserted by the Treasury into circulation free of interest (production of these notes was halted in 1971 during termination of the Bretton Woods system, yet Congress retains the power to put more into circulation at any time, and $300 million remain in circulation still).

==== Interest-bearing notes ====
Interest-bearing notes are a grouping of Civil War-era bills of credit-related emissions of the US Treasury. The grouping includes the one- and two-year notes authorized by the Act of March 3, 1863, which bore interest at five percent annually, were a legal tender at face value, and were issued in denominations of $10, $20, $50, $100, $500 and $1000.

==== Compound interest treasury notes ====
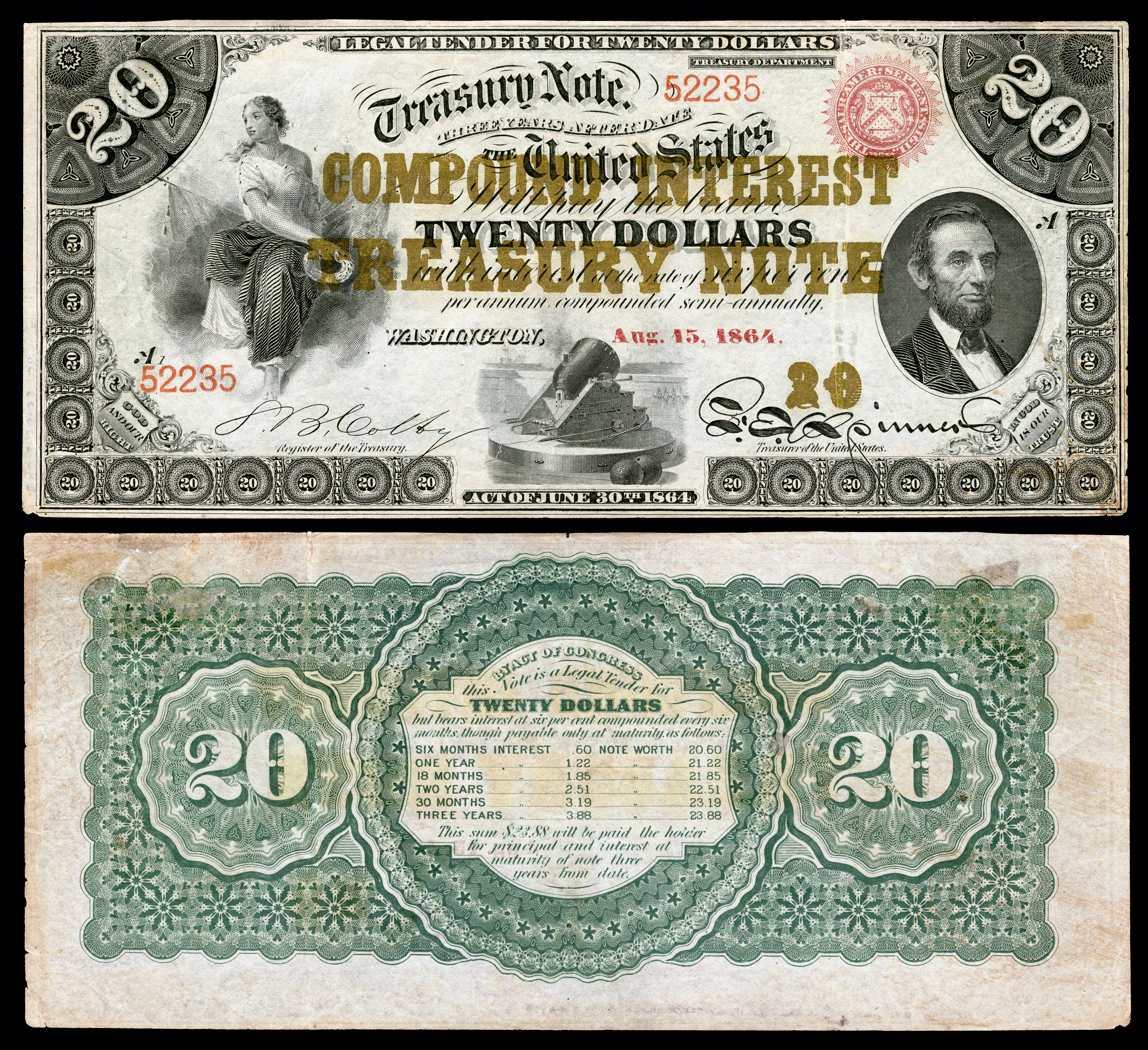
Two-year $20 1864 compound interest treasury note

Compound interest treasury notes were emissions of the United States Treasury Department authorized in 1863 and 1864 with aspects of both paper money and debt. They were issued in denominations of $10, $20, $50, $100, $500 and $1000. While they were legal tender at face value, they were redeemable after three years with six percent annual interest compounded semi-annually.

In the absence of efficient investment banks, the hybrid nature of these instruments allowed the government to directly distribute debt by paying the notes out to creditors as legal tender, and then relying on interest-seeking parties to eventually remove them from circulation in order to redeem them with interest at maturity.

==== Refunding Certificate ====
The Refunding Certificate was a type of interest-bearing banknote that the United States Treasury issued in 1879. They issued it only in the $10 denomination, depicting Benjamin Franklin. Their issuance reflects the end of a coin-hoarding period that began during the American Civil War, and represented a return to public confidence in paper money.

=== 20th century ===
==== Federal Reserve Bank Notes ====
Federal Reserve Bank Notes, issued between 1915 and 1934, are bills of credit that are legal tender in the United States. They had the same value as other kinds of notes of similar face value. Federal Reserve Bank Notes differ from Federal Reserve Notes in that they are backed by one of the twelve Federal Reserve Banks, rather than by all collectively. They were backed in a similar way to National Bank Notes, using U.S. bonds, but issued by Federal Reserve banks instead of by chartered National banks. Federal Reserve Bank Notes are no longer issued.

== Sources ==
- Fleming, Thomas. New Jersey: A History. New York: Norton. 1984.
