= Rhode Island pound =

Currency issued in the Rhode Island colony

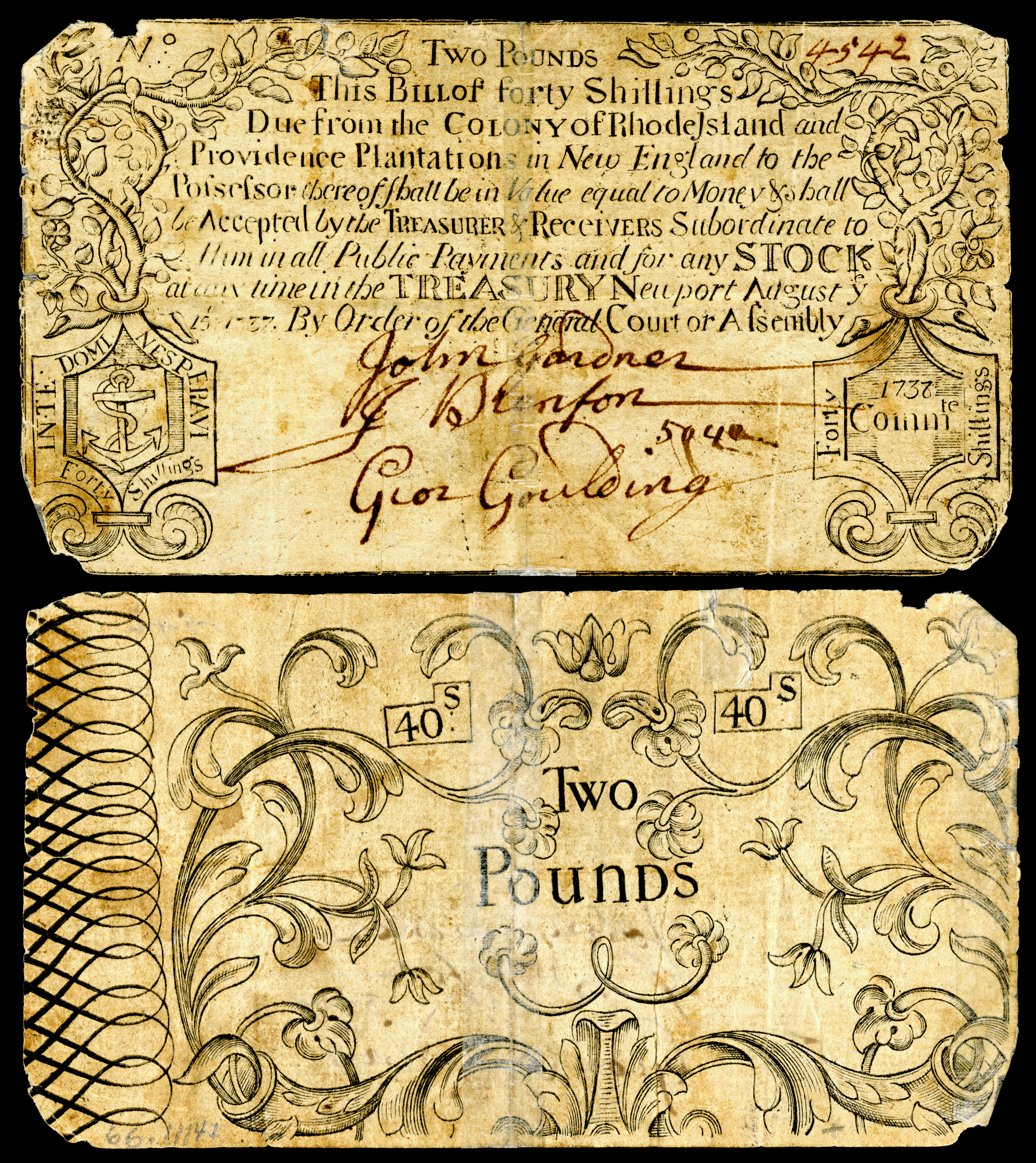
Early issue £2 Colonial currency from the Colony of Rhode Island dated August 15, 1737

The pound was the currency of Rhode Island until 1793. Initially, sterling coin and foreign coins circulated, supplemented by local paper money from 1710. These notes were denominated in £sd, but they were worth less than sterling, with 1 Rhode Island shilling = 9d sterling. The first issue of notes was known as the "Old Tenor" issue. This fell in value and "New Tenor" notes were introduced in 1740, worth four times the Old Tenor notes. Both Old and New Tenor notes were replaced in 1763 by "Lawful money" at a rate of 1 Lawful shilling = 6 2/3 New Tenor shillings = 26 2/3 old Tenor shillings.

The state of Rhode Island issued Continental currency denominated in £sd and Spanish dollars, with 1 dollar = 6 shillings. The continental currency was replaced by the U.S. dollar at a rate of 1,000 continental dollars = 1 U.S. dollar.
