= Maryland pound =

Early currency of Maryland

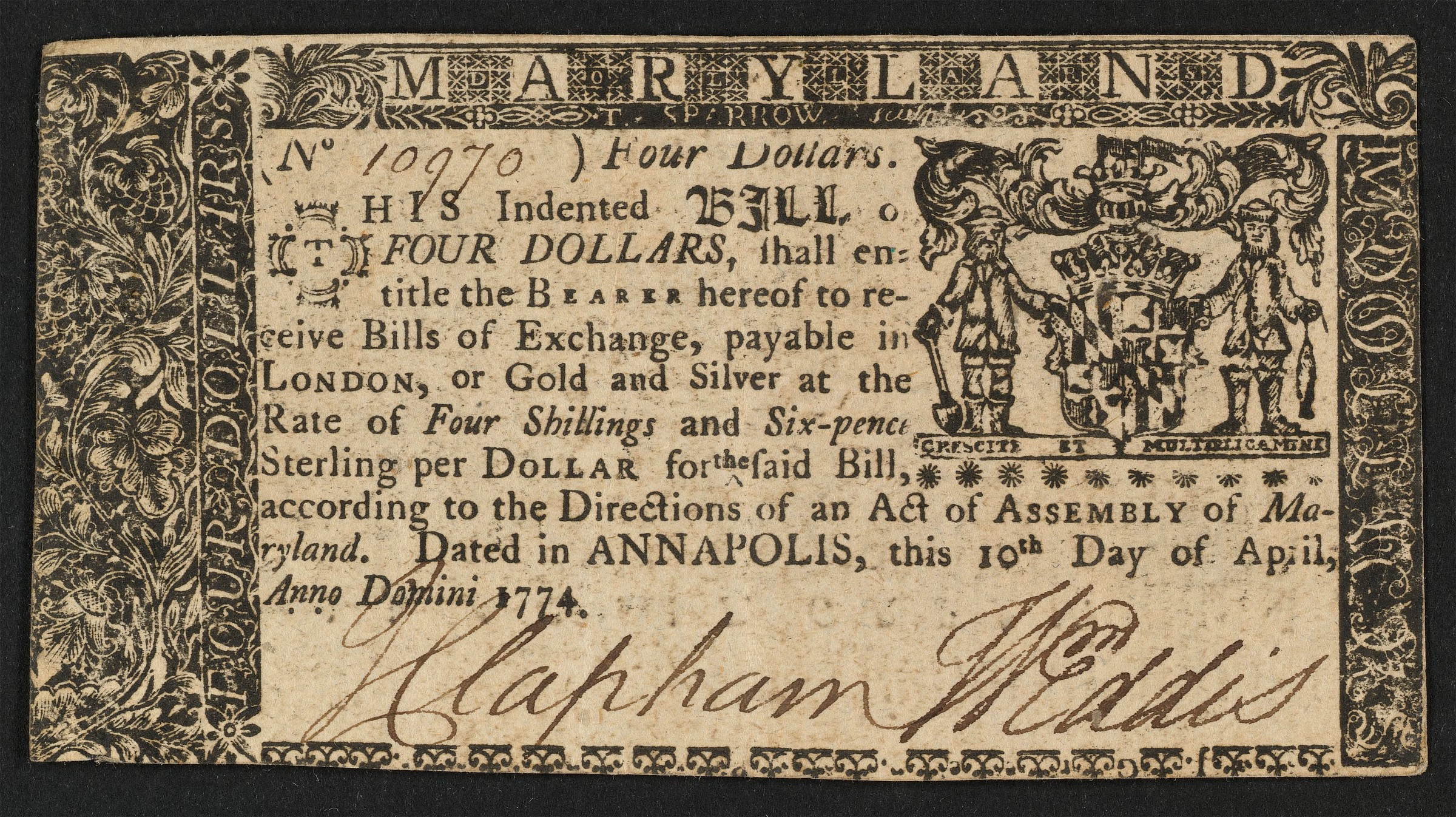
Maryland four-dollar banknote from 1774

The pound (later dollar) was the currency of Maryland from 1733 until its gradual replacement with the Continental currency and later the United States dollar between the American Revolution and the early 1800s. Initially, sterling coin circulated along with foreign coins. From 1733, this was supplemented by paper money, known as "Proclamation Money", denominated in £sd, but worth less than sterling, with 1 Maryland shilling (12 pence) = 9 pence sterling. A second "New" issue of notes was introduced in 1751, replacing the earlier notes at a rate of 1 New shilling = 1¼ Proclamation shillings.

The first issues of Continental currency in Maryland were denominated in £sd and Spanish dollars at a rate of 1 dollar = 4 shillings 6 pence. In 1780 two types of continental currency were issued, one valuing the Spanish dollar at 4 shillings 6 pence (printed in red ink and known as "Red Money"), the other (printed in black ink and known as "Black Money") valuing the Spanish dollar at 7 shillings 6 pence.
