= New Hampshire pound =

Currency of New Hampshire until 1793

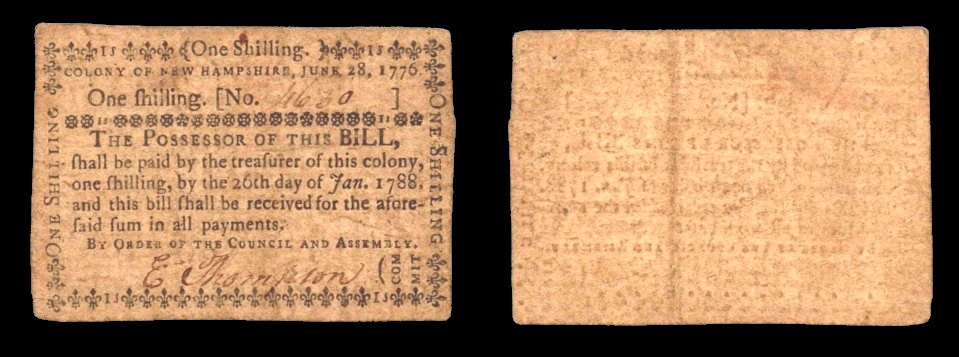
One-shilling note, issued in New Hampshire in 1776

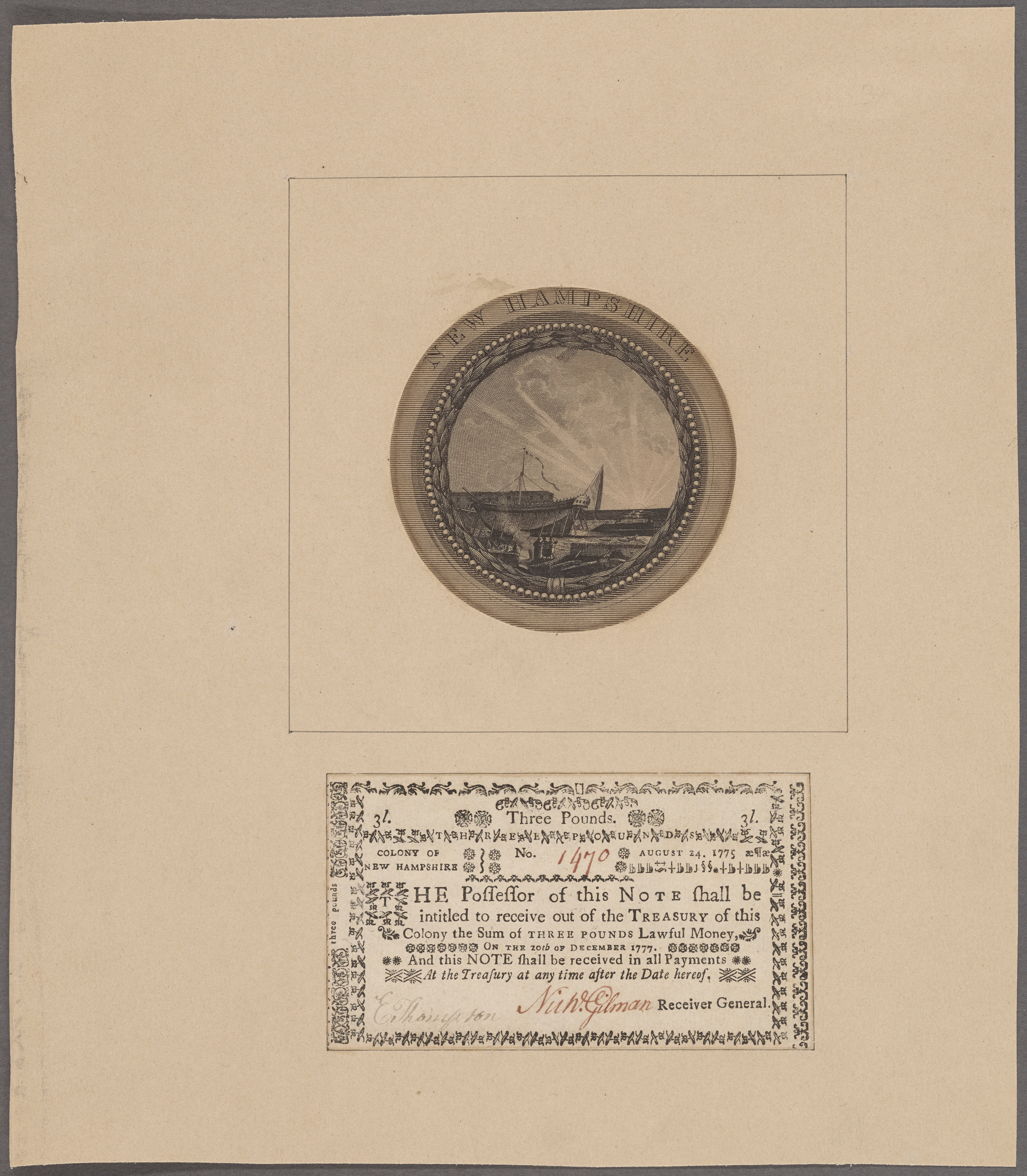
Three-pound note, issued in New Hampshire in 1775

The pound was the currency of New Hampshire until 1793. Initially, sterling coin circulated, supplemented from 1709 by local paper money. These notes were denominated in £sd but were worth less than sterling, with 1 New Hampshire shilling = 9 pence sterling. This first issue of paper money was known as the "Old Tenor" issue.

In 1742, following depreciation of the Old Tenor notes, "New Tenor" notes were issued worth 4 times the Old tenor notes. These were replaced, in 1755, by the "Lawful Money" issue. These notes were initially equal to their face value in sterling and replaced the previous issues at the rates of 1 Lawful shilling = 3⅓ New Tenor shillings = 13⅓ Old Tenor shillings. The "Colonial" issue of paper money was introduced in 1763, worth 1⅓ times the Lawful Money notes.

The State of New Hampshire issued Continental currency denominated in £sd and Spanish dollars, with 1 dollar = 6 shillings. The continental currency was replaced by the U.S. dollar at a rate of 1000 continental dollars = 1 U.S. dollar.
