= New York pound =

Currency of New York until 1793

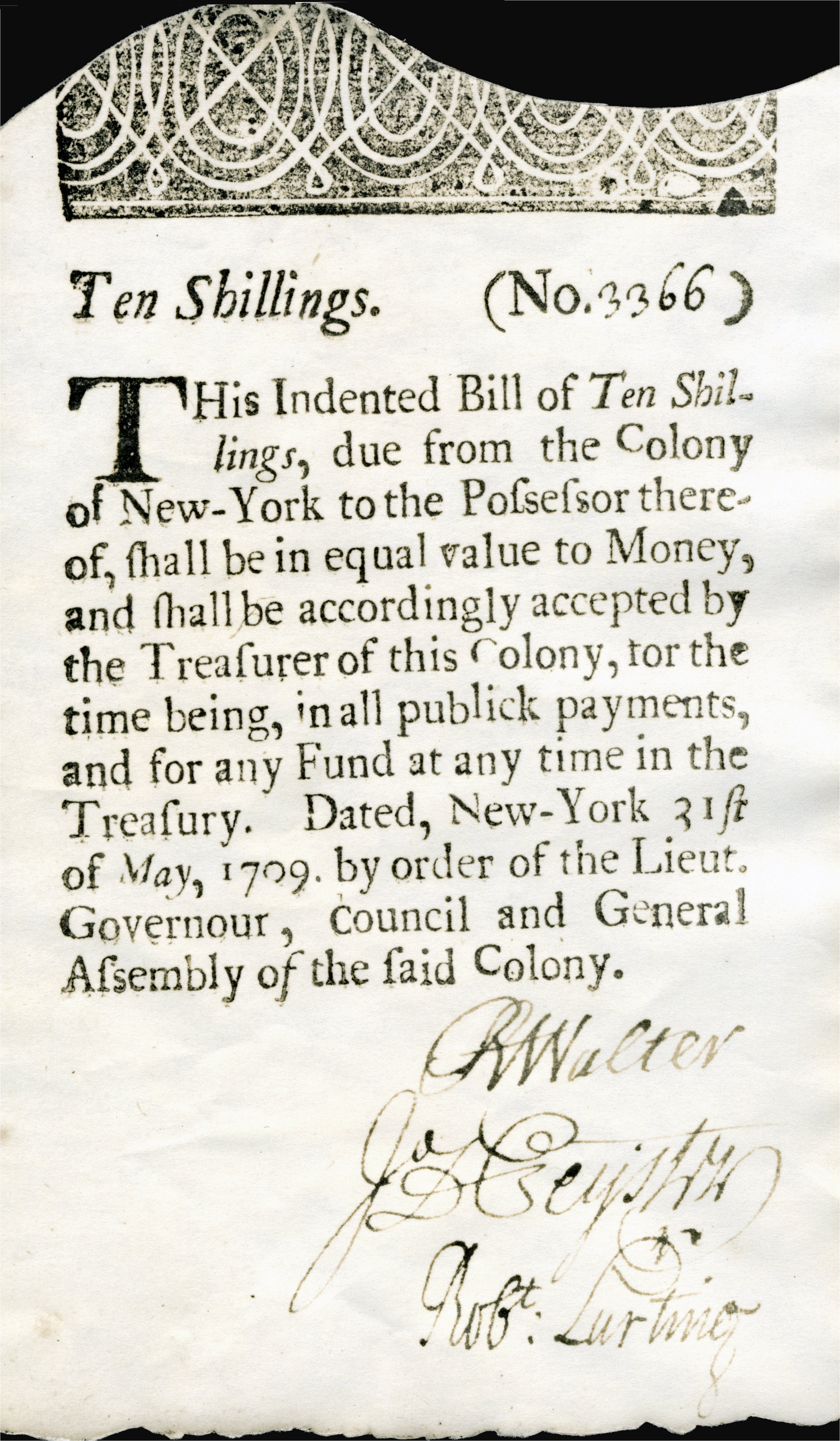
10s Colonial currency from the Colony of New York. First issue (May 31, 1709) from New York.

The pound was the currency of the province and state of New York until 1793. Initially, sterling coin circulated along with foreign currencies. This was supplemented by local paper money from 1709. Although these were denominated in £sd, they were worth one third less than sterling, with one New York shilling worth 8d sterling.

The State of New York issued Continental currency denominated in £sd and Spanish dollars, with 1 dollar = 8/–. This valuation of the Spanish dollar was known as the York rating. The continental currency was replaced by the U.S. dollar at a rate of 1,000 continental dollars = 1 U.S. dollar.
