= Brunei pitis =

Former currency of Brunei

The pitis was a currency of Brunei, last issued in 1868, which circulated into the 20th century. It is also referred to as the picis by Antonio Pigafetta and some variants of it were referred to as the kue and the paku (English: piece). It was later replaced by the Straits dollar in Brunei, which is valued at 4,000 pitis or 800 paku and at par with the Spanish dollar.

== History ==
Before the introduction of coins in Brunei, Cowrie shells were used as bartering currency in purchasing small items. Brunei is also famous for its bronze teapots, which were used as currency in barter trade along the coast of North Borneo.

The first coinage used in Brunei were Chinese, the first type of coins referred to as the pitis. Its use probably started with the Chinese contact with Brunei between the 9th and 12th century.

When Antonio Pigafetta, who was Ferdinand Magellan's chronicler, visited Brunei in 1521, he wrote "The money is made out of bronze pierced in the middle in order that it may be strung. On each side of it are four Chinese characters, which are letters of the Great King of China. We call the money picils." Picils is a reference to the pitis.

In the 16th century, Brunei started issuing its own currency. These coins were known as pitis, with the Chinese "pitis" being referred to as kue to differentiate them from the Bruneian coins. Chinese coins continued to circulate in Brunei until around the second half of the 19th century.

In addition to pitis and kue, silver Spanish dollars circulated with an exchange rate of 4,000 pitis = 1 dollar. Iron ingots were also used as money, with 100 flat, inch square pieces worth 1 dollar. Miniature cannons between 6 inches (150 mm) to a foot long were also used as currency.

In 1906, Sultan Hashim agreed to have a British Resident in Brunei. He also acquiesced that the Straits dollar, used by the British in the Straits Settlement (Malaya), Singapore, North Borneo (Sabah) and Sarawak, should be used in Brunei. Despite the introduction of the Straits dollar, the previous local monies were still used with peculiar exchange rates in the earlier days. All the previous pitis coins were called paku (English: piece) where 8 paku were equal to 1 cent or kayu (sakayu). However, officially, 4,000 pitis equaled one dollar.

== Coins ==
Brunei's first coins were struck in a tin-lead alloy. These are further subdivided into about three sets. The earliest types bore an anonymous, flowery design. These were followed by issues of unnamed sultans. Finally, coins bearing the names of known Sultans were issued. These coins were struck from about the 16th century to about the 19th century.

Coins of the unnamed Sultans have the honorific title of the Sultan minted on the coins. Some of the titles includes Malikul-Adil (The Just Sultan) and Malikul-Thahir (The Victorious Sultan). The title is generic though it has been speculated that the coins belonged to that of Sultan Muhammad Hasan who ruled between 1605 and 1620.

The first pitis with a definite date was that issued by Sultan Abdul Momin, who ruled from 1853 to 1885. The principal metal of this coin is lead with some tin content. On the front, the coin shows the Royal umbrellas and other Brunei state insignia. The coin also has an inscription translated as "By order of the State Financial Administration of Brunei, in the year of the Prophet 1285". The year of the Prophet 1285, or 1285 Hijrah (AH 1285), is the date according to the Islamic calendar and it corresponds to AD 1868. The coins were of two denominations – 1/2 and 1 pitis.

The last Sultan to issue his own coin was Sultan Hashim who issued the "star coin" in 1886 (printed as AH 1304 on the coin) which was minted in Birmingham, England. These coins were bronze and have on the obverse a star inside a circle with an Arabic inscription outside. The reverse has a "1" inside a circle with "SULTANATE OF BRUNEI 1304".

== See also ==
- Brunei dollar
- Coins of the Brunei dollar
- Kelantan keping
- Trengganu keping

Preceded by: cowrie shells	Currency of Brunei; 9th to 12th Century – 1906	Succeeded by: Straits dollar Ratio: Officially 4,000 pitis = 1 Straits dollar Unofficially 800 paku = 1 Straits dollar
