= Straits Settlements =

British colony in Southeast Asia (1826–1946)

Coordinates: 1°22′N 103°48′E

Straits Settlements: Negeri-negeri Selat نݢري٢ سلت (Malay); 海峽殖民地 (Chinese); நீரிணை குடியேற்றங்கள் (Tamil)
- 1826–1946
- Flag (1925–1946) Coat of arms
- Anthem: "God Save the King/Queen"
- Malaya in 1922: Unfederated Malay States: Johor, Kedah, Kelantan, Perlis, Terengganu Federated Malay States: Negeri Sembilan, Selangor, Pahang, Perak Straits Settlements: Malacca, Penang, Singapore, Dinding
- Status: Division within Bengal Presidency (1826–1867); Crown colony (1867–1946)
- Capital: George Town (1826–1832); Singapore (1832–1946)
- Official languages: English
- Common languages: English; Malay; Chinese; Tamil
- Religion: Islam; Christianity; Hinduism; Buddhism; Confucianism; Taoism; Chinese folk religion Animism/Traditional religion (Note: practised by Orang Asli peoples)
- Government: Monarchy
- Monarch
  - 1826–1830 (first): George IV
  - 1936–1946 (last): George VI
- Governor
  - 1826–1830 (first): Robert Fullerton
  - 1934–1946 (last): Shenton Thomas
- Historical era: British Empire
  - Anglo-Dutch Treaty: 17 March 1824
  - Established under East India Co. rule: 1826
  - Converted to Crown colony: 1 April 1867
  - Labuan incorporated: 1 January 1907
  - Japanese invasion of Malaya and beginning of Japanese occupation of Malaya: 8 December 1941
  - Fall of Singapore: 15 February 1942
  - Formal surrender by Japan to British Military Administration: 12 September 1945
  - Federated into the Malayan Union and the Colony of Singapore: 1 April 1946
  - Labuan to Crown Colony of North Borneo: 15 July 1946
- Currency: Straits dollar (1898–1939); Malayan dollar (1939–1946)
Preceded by
| Kedah Sultanate |
| Founding years of modern Singapore |
| Dutch Malacca |
| Dindings |
| Johor Sultanate |
| Perak Sultanate |
Succeeded by
| Malayan Union |
| Colony of Singapore |
| Colony of Malacca |
| Colony of Penang |
| Bengal Presidency |
| Sultanate of Perak |
- Today part of: Malaysia; Singapore

The Straits Settlements (Malay: Negeri-Negeri Selat) were a group of British territories located in Southeast Asia. Originally established in 1826 as part of the territories controlled by the British East India Company, the Straits Settlements came under control of the British Raj in 1858 and then under direct British control as a Crown colony in 1867. In 1946, following the end of World War II and the Japanese occupation, the colony was dissolved as part of Britain's reorganisation of its Southeast Asian dependencies in the area.

The Straits Settlements originally consisted of the four individual settlements of Penang, Singapore, Malacca and Dinding. Christmas Island and the Cocos (Keeling) Islands were added in 1886. The island of Labuan, off the coast of Borneo, was also incorporated into the colony with effect from 1 January 1907, becoming a separate settlement within it in 1912. Most of the territories now form part of Malaysia, from which Singapore separated in 1965. The Cocos (Keeling) Islands and Christmas Island were transferred from Singapore to Australian control in 1955 and 1958, respectively. Their administrations were combined in 1996 to form the Australian Indian Ocean Territories.

== Settlements ==
=== Dindings ===
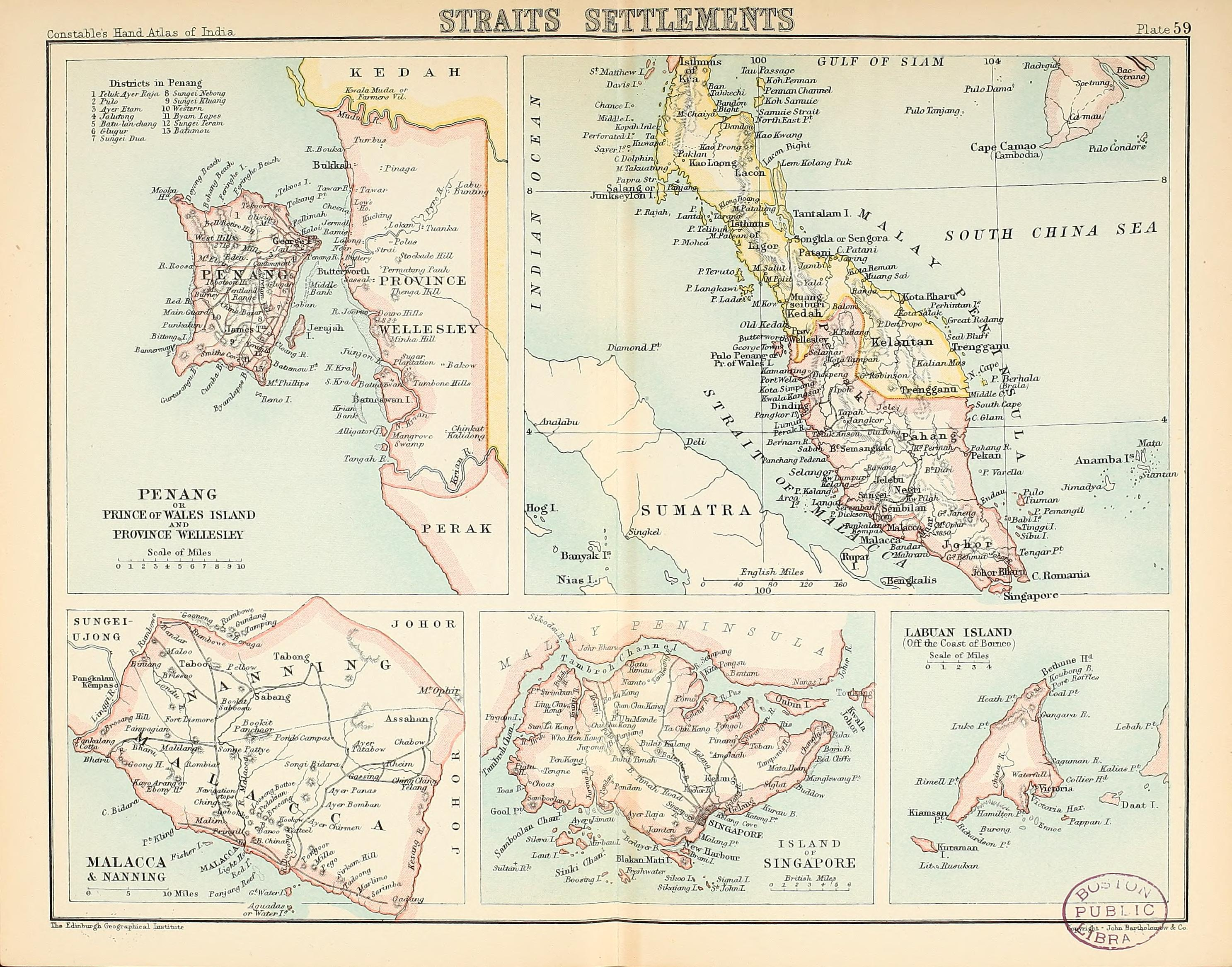
Map of the Straits Settlements of British Malaya, from the Constable's Hand Atlas of India (1893)

The Dindings—named after the Dinding River in present-day Manjung District—which comprised Pangkor Island and the town of Lumut on the mainland, were ceded by Perak to the British government under the Pangkor Treaty of 1874. It was hoped that its excellent natural harbour would prove to be valuable. This did not come to be with the territory being sparsely inhabited and altogether politically and financially unimportant. It was returned to Perak in February 1935.

=== Malacca ===
The Dutch colony of Malacca was ceded to the British in the Anglo-Dutch Treaty of 1824 in exchange for the British possession of Bencoolen and for British rights in Sumatra. Malacca's importance was in establishing an exclusive British zone of influence in the region, and was overshadowed as a trading post by Penang and, later, Singapore.

=== Penang and Province Wellesley ===
The first settlement was the Penang territory, in 1786. This originally comprised Penang Island, then known as the 'Prince of Wales Island'. This was later extended to encompass an area of the mainland, which became known as Province Wellesley (now Seberang Perai). The first grant was in 1800, followed by another in 1831. Further adjustments to Province Wellesley's border were made in 1859, in 1867 with a treaty with Siam and in 1874 with the Treaty of Pangkor. It was administered by a district officer, with some assistants, answering to the resident councillor of Penang. Province Wellesley consisted, for the most part, of a fertile plain, thickly populated by Malays, and occupied in some parts by sugar-planters and others engaged in similar agricultural industries and employing Chinese and Tamil labour. About a tenth of the whole area was covered by low hills with thick jungle. Large quantities of rice were grown by the Malay inhabitants, and between October and February, there was snipe-shooting in the paddy fields. A railway from Butterworth, opposite Penang, runs into Perak, and then via Selangor and Negri Sembilan to Malacca, with an extension via Muar under the rule of the Sultan of Johor, and through Johor to Johor Bahru, opposite Singapore.

=== Singapore ===
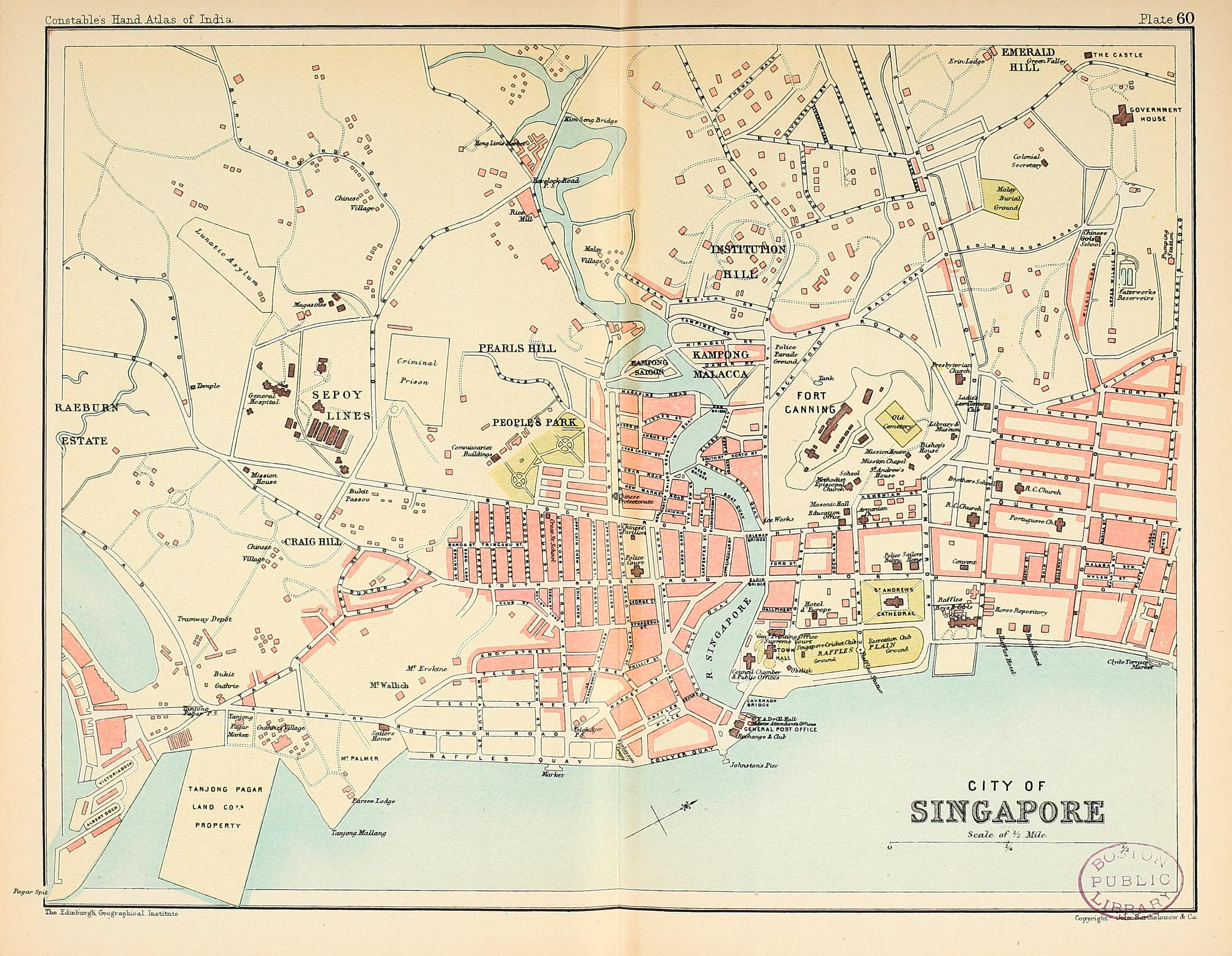
Plan map of the City of Singapore of British Malaya, from the Constable's Hand Atlas of India (1893)

Singapore became the site of a British trading post in 1819 after its founder, Stamford Raffles, successfully involved the East India Company in a dynastic struggle for the throne of Johor. Thereafter the British came to control the entire island of Singapore, which was developed into a thriving colony and port. In 1824, the Dutch conceded any rights they had to the island in the Anglo-Dutch Treaty of 1824, and from 1832, Singapore was the seat of government of the Straits Settlements for 114 years until its dissolution in 1946.

== History and government ==
=== East India Company rule ===
The establishment of the Straits Settlements followed the Anglo-Dutch Treaty of 1824, by which the Malay Archipelago was divided into a British zone in the north and a Dutch zone in the south. This resulted in the exchange of the British settlement of Bencoolen (on Sumatra) for the Dutch colony of Malacca and undisputed control of Singapore. The population of the settlements were largely Chinese, with a tiny but important European minority. Their capital was moved from George Town, the capital of Penang, to Singapore in 1832. Their scattered nature proved to be difficult and, after the company lost its monopoly in the china trade in 1833, expensive to administer.

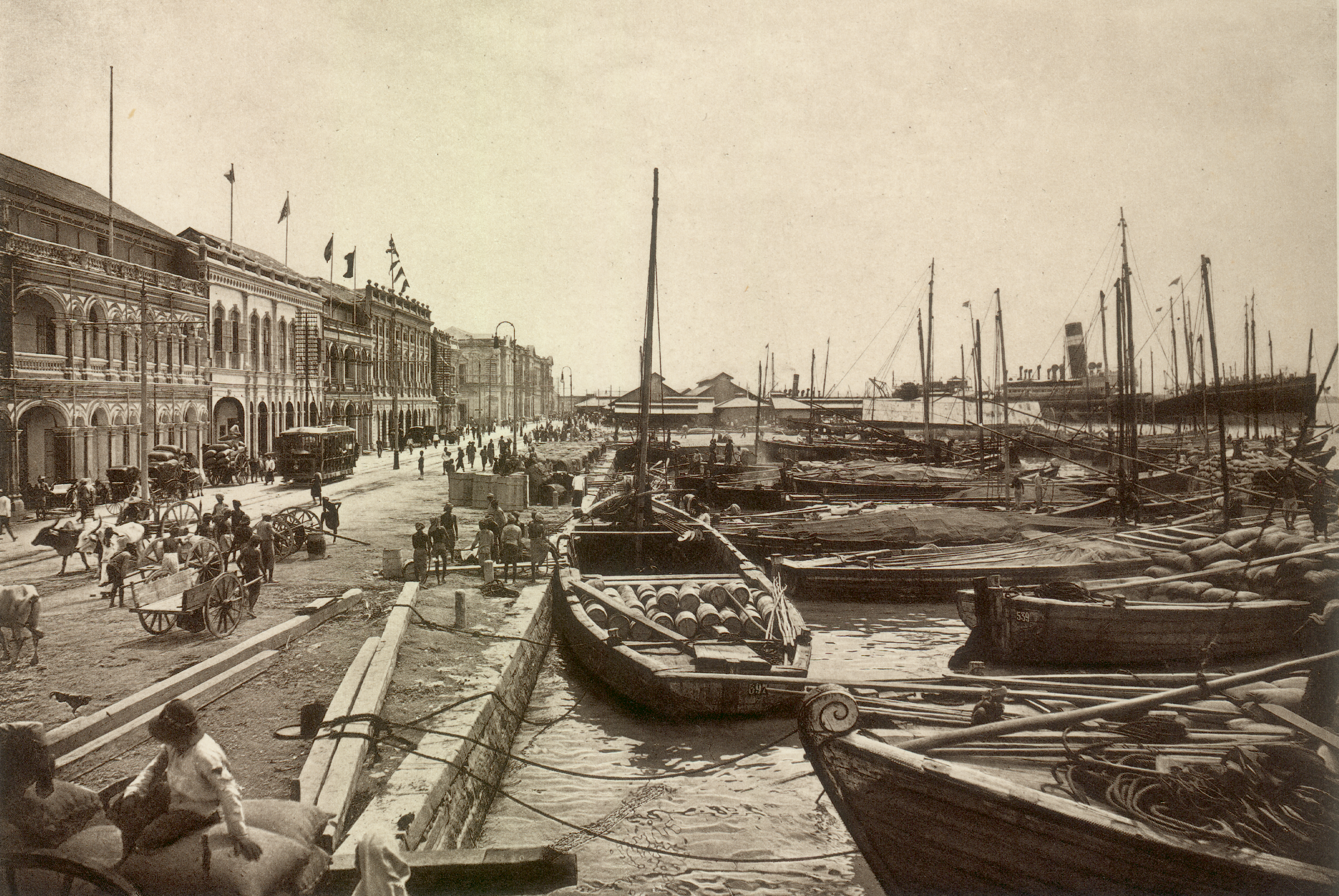
The Port of Penang in George Town during the 1910s

During their control by the East India Company, the settlements were used as penal settlements for Indian civilian and military prisoners, earning them the title "Botany Bays of India". There were minor uprisings by convicts in Singapore and Penang in 1852 and 1853. Upset with East India Company rule, in 1857 the European population of the settlements sent a petition to the British Parliament asking for direct rule; but the idea was overtaken by the Indian Rebellion of 1857.

When a "Gagging Act" was imposed to prevent the uprising in India from spreading, the settlements' press reacted with anger, classing it as something that subverted "every principle of liberty and free discussion". As there was little or no vernacular press in the settlements, such an act seemed irrelevant: it was rarely enforced and ended in less than a year.

=== British Raj ===
The Straits Settlements came under the control of the British Raj in 1858.

=== Crown colony status ===
Straits Settlements Act 1866 (Note: The citation of this act by this short title was authorised by section 1 of, and the first schedule to, the Short Titles Act 1896. Due to the repeal of those provisions it is now authorised by section 19(2) of the Interpretation Act 1978.)
- Act of Parliament
- Parliament of the United Kingdom
- Long title: An Act to provide for the Government of the "Straits Settlements."
- Citation: 29 & 30 Vict. c. 115
- Territorial extent: United Kingdom

Dates
- Royal assent: 10 August 1866
- Commencement: 10 August 1866 (Note: The Acts of Parliament (Commencement) Act 1793.)
- Repealed: 1 April 1946
Other legislation
| Repealed by | Straits Settlements (Repeal) Act 1946 |

Status: Repealed

Text of statute as originally enacted

On 1 April 1867, the Straits Settlements were transferred to the British Colonial Office and became a Crown colony, making the settlements answerable directly to the Colonial Office in London instead of the Government of India in Calcutta. Earlier, on 4 February 1867, letters patent had granted the settlements a colonial constitution. This allocated much power to the settlements' governor, who administered the colony of the Straits Settlements with the aid of an Executive Council, composed wholly of official (i.e., ex-officio) members, and a legislative council, composed partly of official and partly of nominated members, of which the former had a narrow permanent majority. The work of administration, both in the colony and in the Federated Malay States, was carried on by means of a civil service whose members were recruited by competitive examination held annually in London.

Penang and Malacca were administered, directly under the governor, by resident councillors.

=== Governor's wider role ===
In 1886, the Cocos (Keeling) Islands (which were settled and once owned by the Scottish Clunies-Ross family) and Christmas Island, formerly attached to Ceylon, were transferred to the care of the government of the Straits Settlements in Singapore. In 1907, the former Crown Colony of Labuan, in Borneo, which for a period was vested in the British North Borneo Company, was resumed by the British government and was vested in the governor of the Straits Settlements.

The governor was also High Commissioner for the Federated Malay States on the peninsula, for British North Borneo, the sultanate of Brunei and Sarawak in Borneo. British residents controlled the native states of Perak, Selangor, Negri Sembilan and Pahang, but on 1 July 1896, when the federation of these states was effected, a resident-general, responsible to the high commissioner, was placed in charge of all the British protectorates in the peninsula.

=== Japanese invasion and dissolution ===
Straits Settlements (Repeal) Act 1946 (Note: Section 3.)
- Act of Parliament
- Parliament of the United Kingdom
- Long title: An Act to repeal the Straits Settlements Act, 1866, and to make further provision for the government of the territories heretofore known as the Straits Settlements.
- Citation: 9 & 10 Geo. 6. c. 37
- Territorial extent: United Kingdom

Dates
- Royal assent: 26 March 1946
- Commencement: 1 April 1946 (Note: Section 1(1).)
- Repealed: 31 August 1963
Other legislation
| Repeals/revokes | Straits Settlements Act 1866 |
| Repealed by | Malaysia Act 1963 |
| Relates to | Colonial Boundaries Act 1895 |

Status: Repealed

Text of statute as originally enacted

During World War II (specifically the Pacific War), the Japanese invaded Malaya and the Straits Settlements by landing on Kelantan on 8 December 1941. On 16 December, Penang became the first Straits Settlement to fall into Japanese hands, followed by Malacca on 15 January 1942. Singapore was the last settlement to fall on 15 February, following the Battle of Singapore. The Straits Settlements, along with the rest of the Malay Peninsula, remained under Japanese occupation until the end of the war in August 1945.

After the war, the colony was dissolved with effect from 1 April 1946, with Singapore becoming a separate Crown colony (and ultimately an independent republic), while Penang and Malacca joined the new Malayan Union (a predecessor of modern-day Malaysia). Labuan was briefly annexed to Singapore, before being attached to the new colony of North Borneo (and ultimately detached to become a Federal Territory).

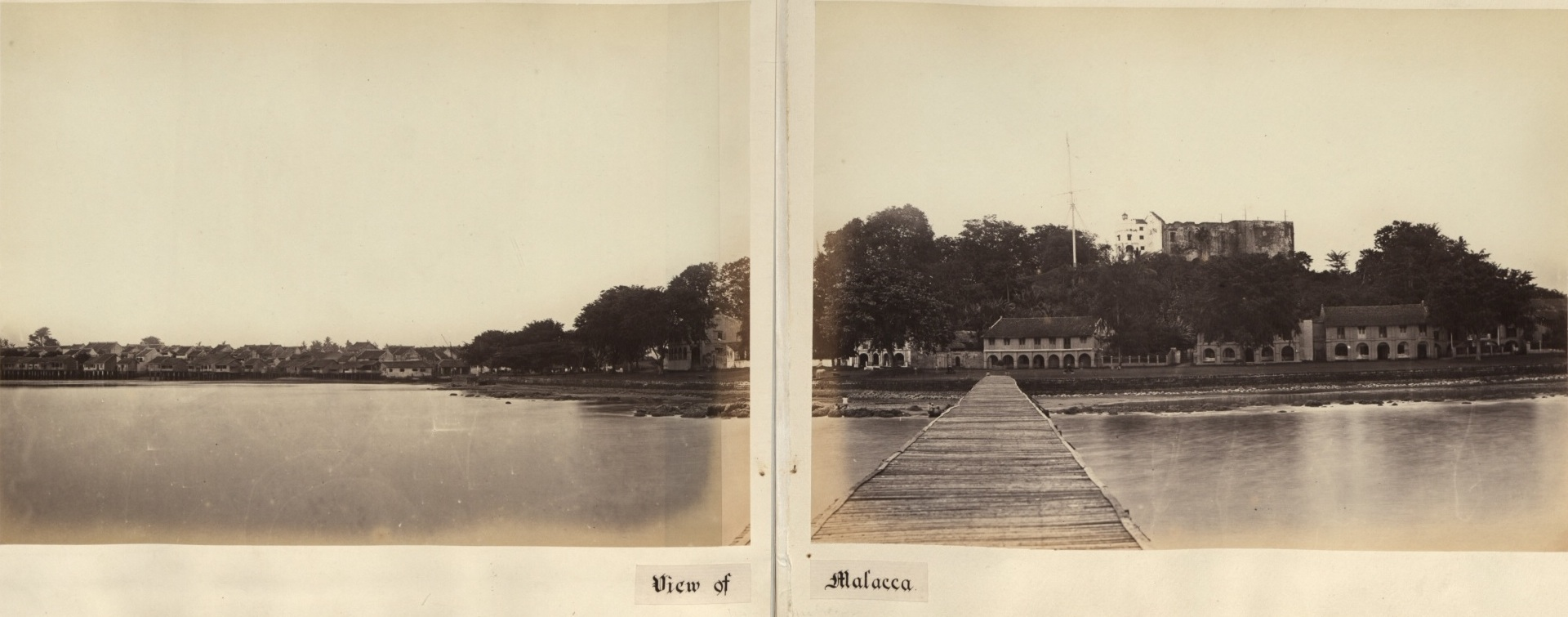
Malacca, 1860–1900

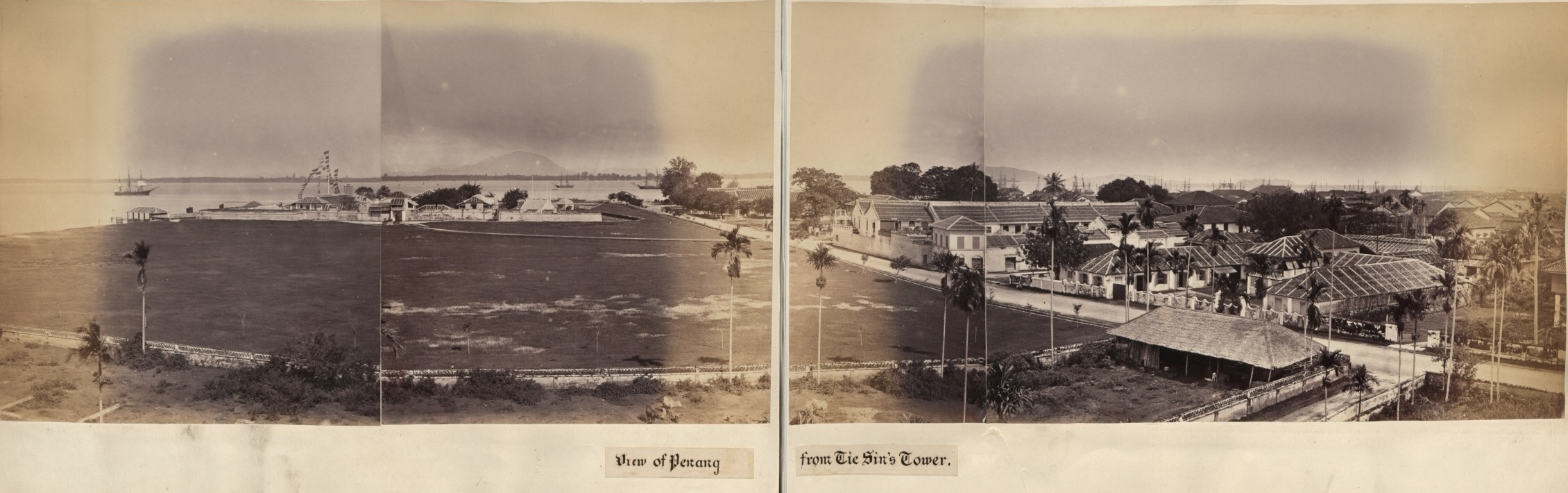
Penang from Tie Sin's Tower, 1860–1900

Evolution of Malaysia

== Population ==
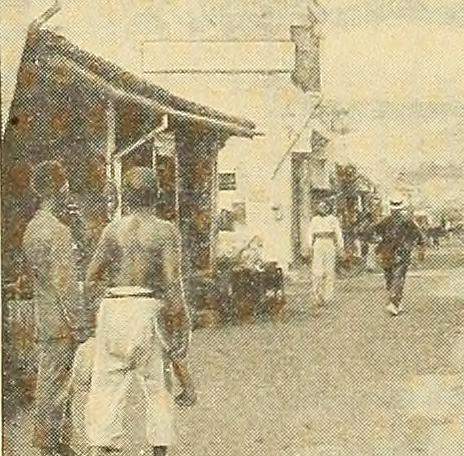
Malacca business street, 1912

The following are the area and population, with details of race distribution, of the colony of the Straits Settlements, the figures being those of the census of 1901:

| | Area in square miles | Population in 1891 | Population in 1901 | | | | | | |
| | Area in square miles | Population in 1891 | Total | Europeans | Eurasians | Chinese | Malays | Indians | Other nationalities |
|---|---|---|---|---|---|---|---|---|---|
| Singapore | 206 | 184,554 | 228,555 | 3,824 | 4,120 | 164,041 | 36,080 | 17,823 | 2,667 |
| Penang, Province Wellesley and Dindings | 381 | 235,618 | 248,207 | 1,160 | 1,945 | 98,424 | 106,000 | 38,051 | 2,627 |
| Malacca | 659 | 92,170 | 95,487 | 74 | 1,598 | 19,468 | 72,978 | 1,276 | 93 |
| Total | 1,246 | 512,342 | 572,249 | 5,058 | 7,663 | 281,933 | 215,058 | 57,150 | 5,387 |

The population, which was 306,775 in 1871 and 423,384 in 1881, had in 1901 reached a total of 572,249. As in former years, the increase was solely due to immigration, especially of Chinese, though a considerable number of Tamils and other natives of India settled in the Straits Settlements. The total number of births registered in the colony in 1900 was 14,814, and the ratio per 1,000 of the population during 1896, 1897 and 1898, respectively, was 22–18, 20–82 and 21–57; while the number of registered deaths for 1896–1900 gave a ratio per 1,000 of 42–21, 36–90, 30–43, 31–66 and 36–25, respectively, the number of deaths registered during 1900 being 23,385. The cause to which the excess of deaths over births is to be attributed is to be found in the fact that the Chinese and Indian population, which numbered 339,083, or over 59 per cent of the whole, was composed of 261,412 males and only 77,671 females, and a comparatively small number of the latter were married women and mothers of families. Male Europeans also outnumbered females by about two to one. Among the Malays and Eurasians, who alone had a fair proportion of both sexes, infant mortality was excessive due to early marriages and other causes.

The number of immigrants landing in the various settlements during 1906 was: Singapore 176,587 Chinese; Penang 56,333 Chinese and 52,041 natives of India; and Malacca 598 Chinese. The total number of immigrants for 1906 was therefore 285,560, against 39,136 emigrants, mostly Chinese returning to China. In 1867, the date of the transfer of the colony from the East India Company to the Crown, the total population was estimated at 283,384.

In 1939, the population reached 1,370,300.

== Finance ==
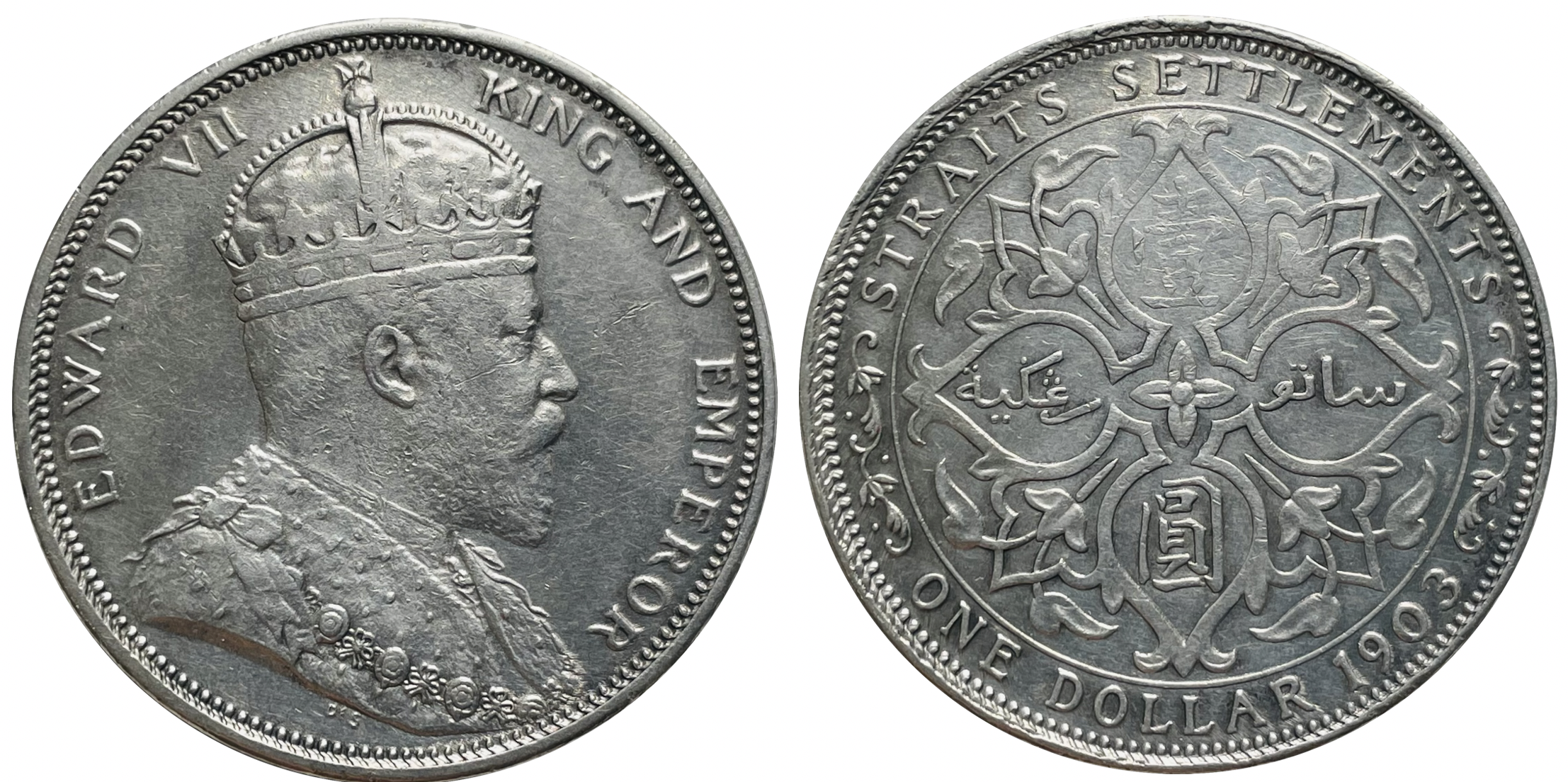
Silver coin: 1 Straits dollar, 1903

In the early nineteenth century, the most common currency used in the East Indies was the Spanish dollar, including issues both from Spain and from the New World Spanish colonies, most significantly Mexico, due to market circulation from the Spanish East Indies (Spanish Philippines). Locally issued coinages included the Kelantan and Trengganu keping, and the Penang dollar. In 1837, the Indian rupee was made the sole official currency in the Straits Settlements, as it was administered as part of India. However, Spanish dollars continued to circulate and 1845 saw the introduction of coinage for the Straits Settlements using a system of 100 cents = 1 Straits dollar, with the dollar equal to the Spanish dollar or Mexican peso. In 1867, the administration of the Straits Settlements was separated from India and the dollar was made the standard currency.

The revenue of the colony in 1868 amounted to $1,301,843. In 1906 revenue was $9,512,132, exclusive of $106,180 received for land sales. Of this sum, $6,650,558 was derived from import duties on opium, wines and spirits, and licences to deal in these articles, $377,972 from land revenue, $592,962 from postal and telegraphic revenue, and $276,019 from port and harbour dues.

Expenditures, which in 1868 amounted to $1,197,177, rose in 1906 to $8,747,819. The total cost of the administrative establishments amounted to $4,450,791, of which $2,586,195 were personal emoluments and $1,864,596 other charges. The military expenditure (the colony paid on this account 20 per cent of its gross revenue to the British government by way of military contribution) amounted in 1906 to $1,762,438; $578,025 was expended on upkeep and maintenance of existing public works, and $1,209,291 on new roads, streets, bridges and buildings.

== See also ==
- Federation of Malaya
- Historic Cities of the Straits of Malacca
- History of Malaysia
- History of Singapore
- Governor of the Straits Settlements
- Legislative Council of the Straits Settlements
- Straits Settlements Police Force
- Straits Settlements Volunteer Force
- Postage stamps and postal history of the Straits Settlements
- Straits Settlements cricket team

== Bibliography ==
- Andaya, Barbara Watson; Andaya, Leonard Y. (1982). A history of Malaysia. New York, N. Y: St. Martin's Pr. ISBN 978-0-312-38120-2.
