= Keping =

keping may refer to:

- Kelantan keping, a former currency of Kelantan (now part of Malaysia)
- Trengganu keping, a former currency of Trengganu (now part of Malaysia)
- Keping County, county in Xinjiang, China
