= Ringgit (disambiguation) =

A ringgit is the common term for the currency used in Malaysia.

Ringgit may also refer to:

- Brunei dollar (called ringgit in Malay), currency used in Brunei
- Singapore dollar, currency used in Singapore
