= States of Malaya =

States of Malaya has a number of possible meanings:

- The Malayan Union, a British colony consisting of all states in Malaya except the settlements of Malacca, Dinding, Penang and Singapore which were part of the British colony of the Straits Settlements
- The Federation of Malaya, the successor state to the Malayan Union and the Straits Settlements
- The Malay states, divided into the Federated Malay States and the Unfederated Malay States
- The States of Johore, Kedah, Kelantan, Malacca, Negeri Sembilan, Pahang, Penang, Perak, Perlis, Selangor and Terengganu; and the Federal Territories of Kuala Lumpur and Putrajaya which constitute part of Malaysia. (also known as Peninsular Malaysia)

== Other uses ==
- In the Interpretation Act 1965 of the Republic of Singapore, the States of Malaya and Singapore are collectively known as Malaya.
