= Dutch Fort =

Historical ruins in Perak Malaysia

- Malay: Kota Belanda
- Pangkor Island, Perak, Malaysia
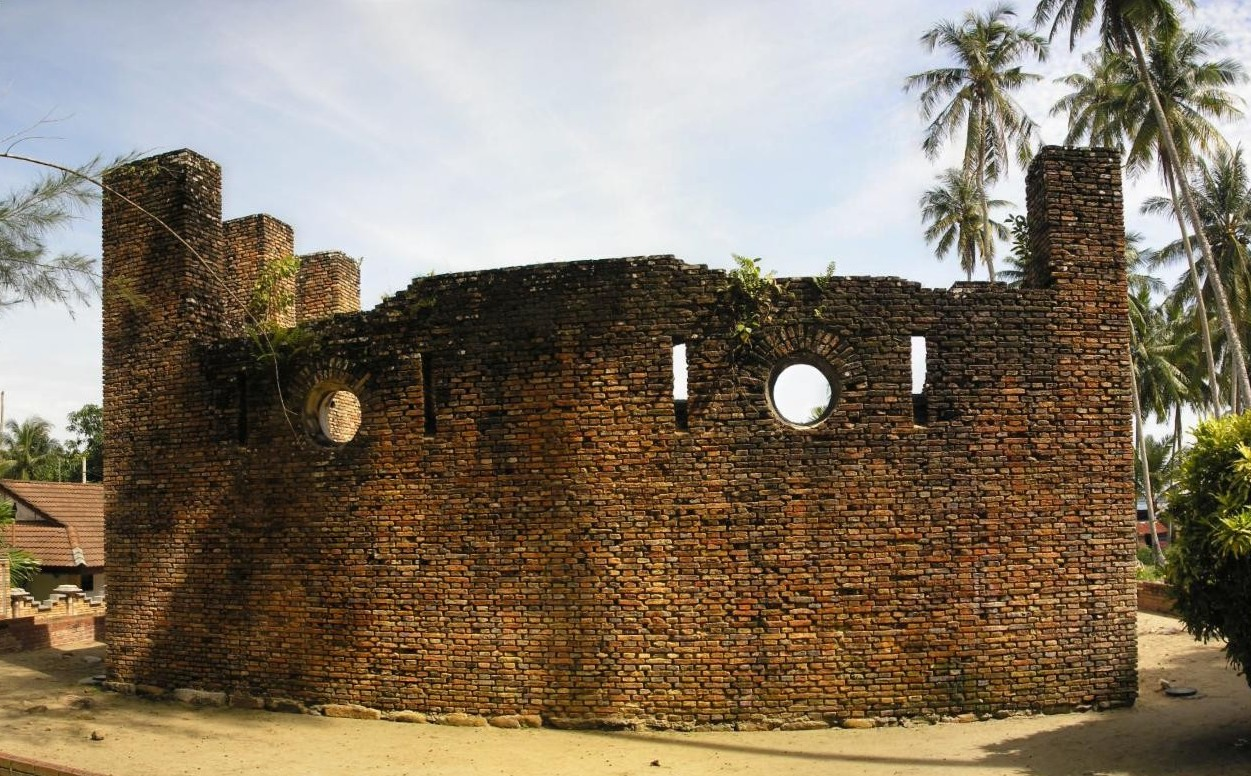
- View of the Dutch Fort towards the ocean.

Site information
- Open to the public: Yes
- Condition: In ruins but parts of its structure have been reconstructed.

Location
- Coordinates: 4°12′2.196″N 100°34′32.89″E

Site history
- Built: 1670, 1743 (rebuilt)
- Built by: Dutch Empire
- In use: 1670–1690, 1743–1748

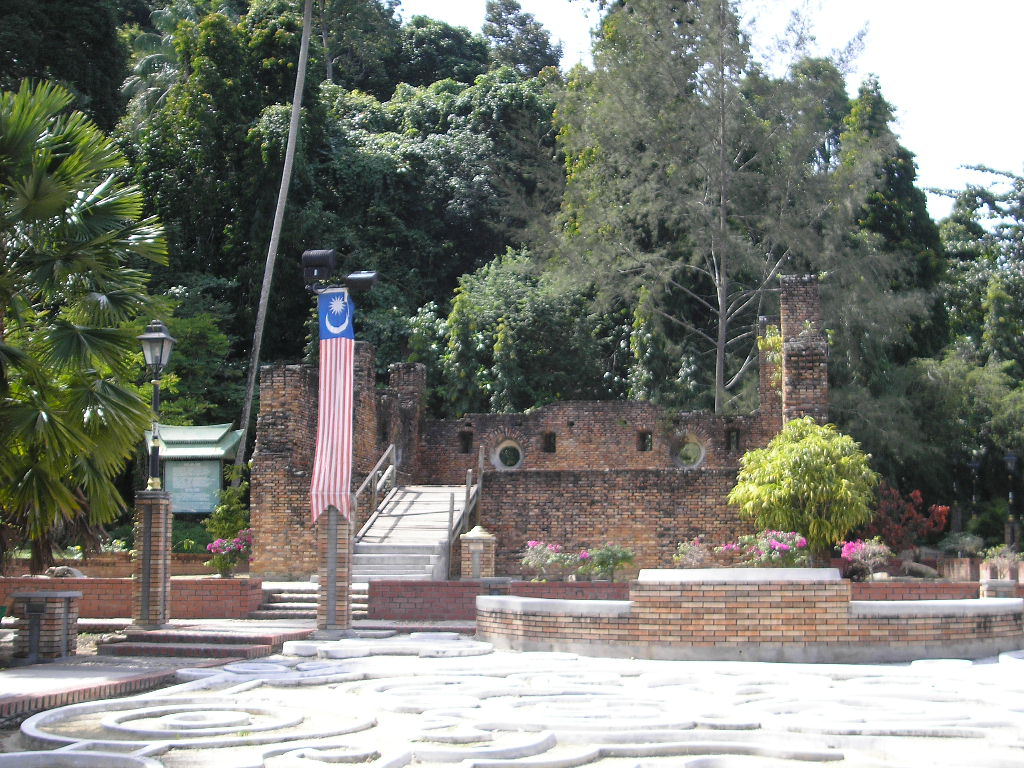
Front view of the ruins of the Dutch Fort

The Dutch Fort is a fort on Pangkor Island, Manjung District, Perak, Malaysia. The ruins are the remnants of an outpost of Dutch from their attempts to control trade in the Malay Peninsula. In the Malay language, the fort is called Kota Belanda. The Dutch called it Fort Dindingh, after the Dinding River, on the mainland of Perak.

The fort was built by the Dutch in 1670 for storage and protection of tin supplies from the Sultanate of Perak. It was destroyed in 1690 by the Malays who were discontent with the methods used by the Dutch in obtaining minerals. It was rebuilt by the Dutch in 1743, and a force of 60 soldiers was placed to guard the fort until 1748, when the force was disbanded and abandoned.

The fort was reconstructed by Malaysia's museum department in 1973 and was gazetted as an ancient monument and historical site under the Antiquities Act 1976 No. 242 Perak Gazette dated 21 March 1978. According to this act, any person found guilty of vandalising an ancient monument and historical site is liable to imprisonment not exceeding three months or a fine not exceeding five hundred Malaysian ringgit or to both.

It is set a short distance from the ocean and consists of three brick walls with round windows at regular intervals. A small park and some souvenir stores have been set up around the area for visitors.
