= Pangkor Laut Island =

Island in Malaysia

Native name: Pulau Pangkor Laut ﭬولاو ﭬڠكور لاءوت
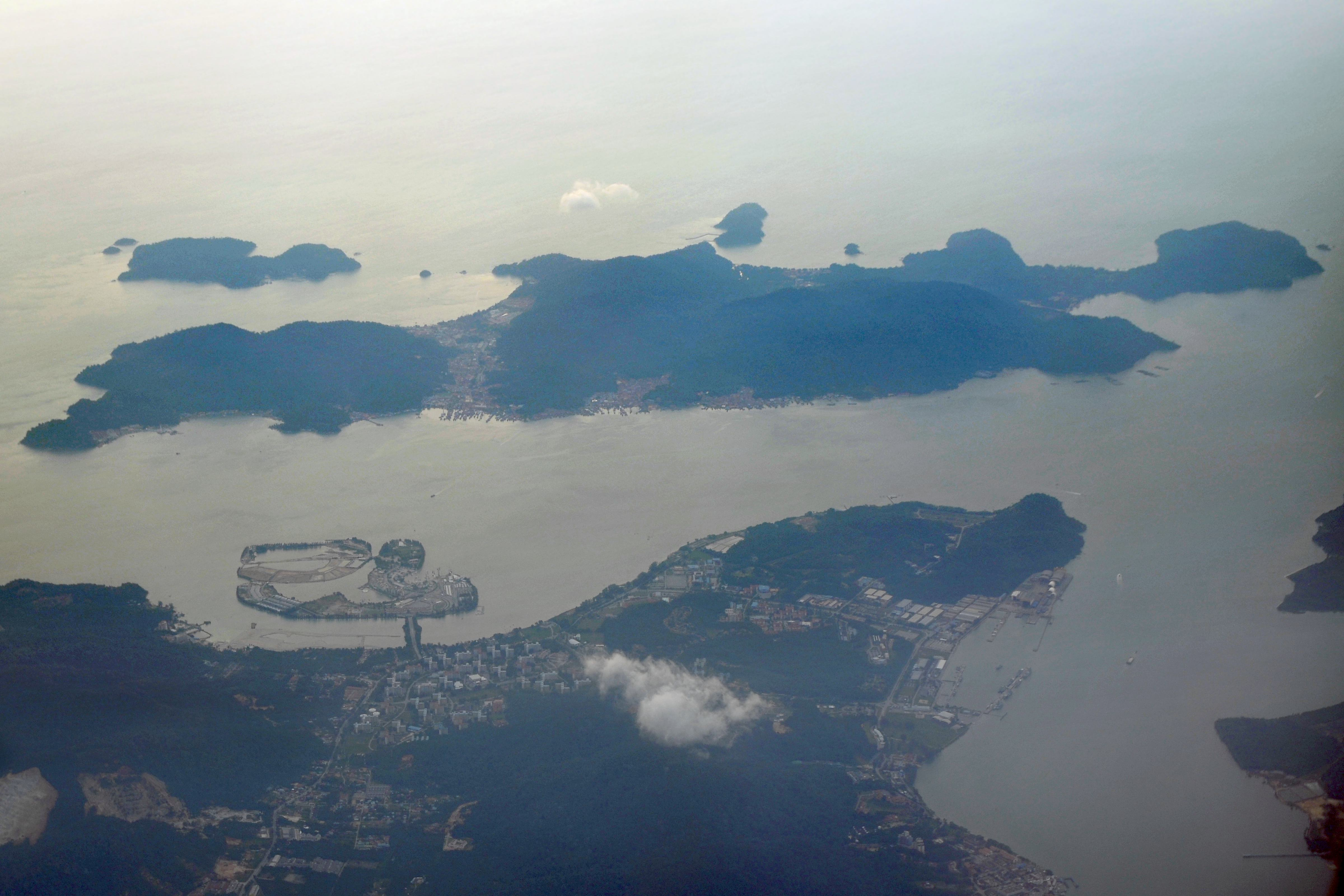
- Aerial photograph of Pangkor Island and Lumut from the east – Pangkor Laut is the smaller island top left of Pangkor Island.
- Interactive map of Pangkor Laut Island

Geography
- Location: Strait of Malacca
- Coordinates: 4°11′27″N 100°32′24″E
- Area: 1.4 km^{2} (0.54 sq mi)

Administration
- Malaysia
- State: Perak
- District: Manjung
- Mukim: Lumut

Additional information
- Time zone: MST (UTC+8)
- Postal code: 32300

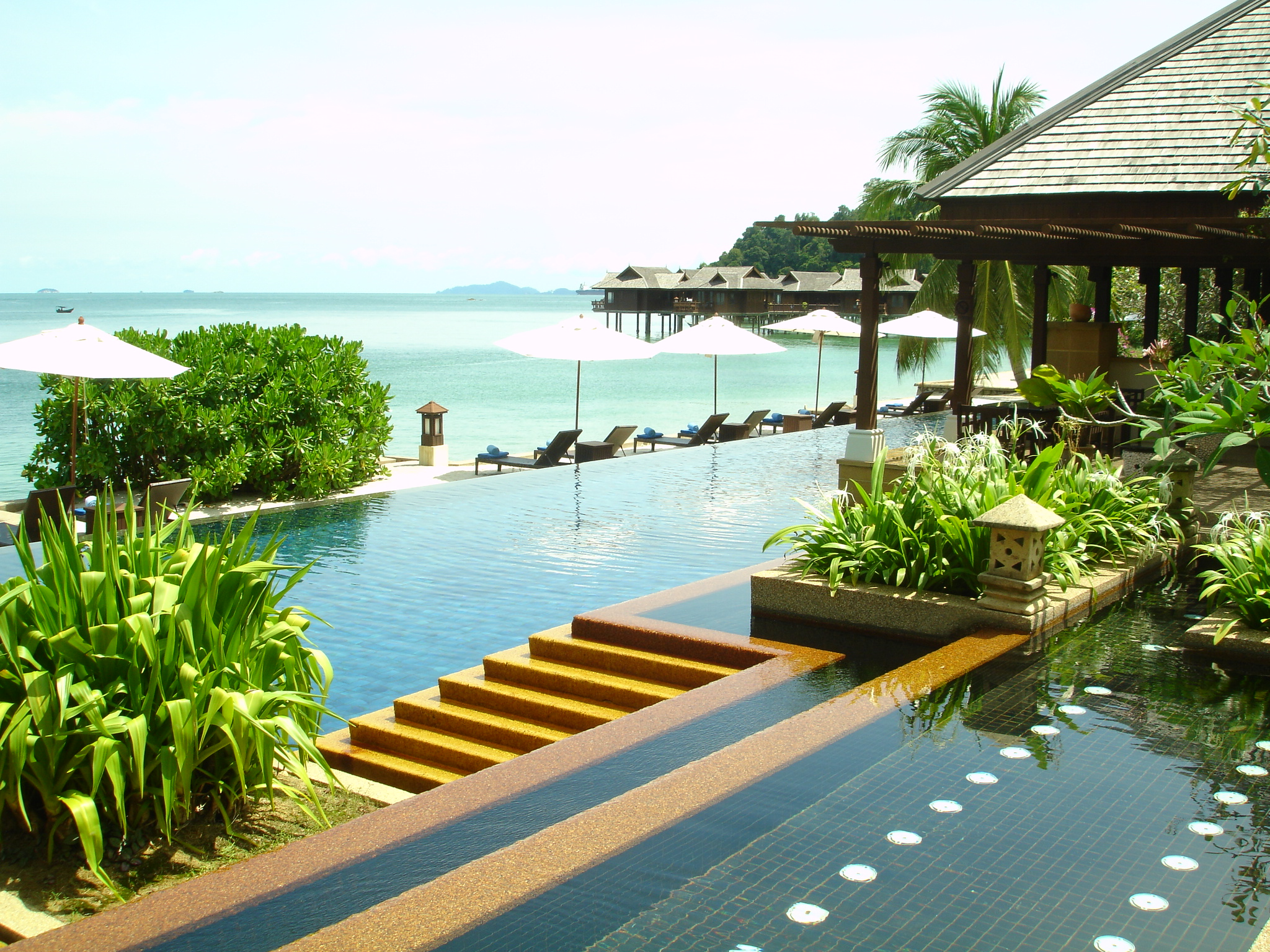
A view of the terraced infinity pools at Pangkor Laut Resort, Pangkor Laut Island, Malaysia.

Pangkor Laut Island is a small island southwest of Pangkor Island, Perak, Malaysia.

== History ==
The idea to place a leper settlement on Pangkor Laut was first proposed in 1893. Within a decade, from Perak and across the country, Malays with leprosy (sakit kusta) were being sent there. In 1905 it was reported that "𝘵𝘩𝘦 𝘭𝘦𝘱𝘦𝘳𝘴 𝘩𝘢𝘷𝘦 𝘯𝘰𝘸 𝘴𝘦𝘵𝘵𝘭𝘦𝘥 𝘥𝘰𝘸𝘯, 𝘢𝘯𝘥 𝘦𝘹𝘱𝘳𝘦𝘴𝘴𝘦𝘥 𝘵𝘩𝘦𝘮𝘴𝘦𝘭𝘷𝘦𝘴 𝘢𝘴 𝘴𝘢𝘵𝘪𝘴𝘧𝘪𝘦𝘥. 𝘛𝘩𝘦𝘪𝘳 𝘸𝘢𝘯𝘵𝘴 𝘢𝘳𝘦 '𝘱𝘳𝘰𝘷𝘪𝘥𝘦𝘥 𝘧𝘰𝘳 𝘪𝘯 𝘢 𝘮𝘰𝘴𝘵 𝘨𝘦𝘯𝘦𝘳𝘰𝘶𝘴 𝘸𝘢𝘺.'" A following report was a bit different: "𝘈𝘭𝘵𝘩𝘰𝘶𝘨𝘩 𝘦𝘷𝘦𝘳𝘺𝘵𝘩𝘪𝘯𝘨 𝘱𝘰𝘴𝘴𝘪𝘣𝘭𝘦 𝘪𝘴 𝘱𝘳𝘰𝘷𝘪𝘥𝘦𝘥 𝘵𝘰 𝘮𝘢𝘬𝘦 𝘵𝘩𝘦𝘴𝘦 𝘶𝘯𝘧𝘰𝘳𝘵𝘶𝘯𝘢𝘵𝘦𝘴 𝘩𝘢𝘱𝘱𝘺 𝘢𝘯𝘥 𝘤𝘰𝘮𝘧𝘰𝘳𝘵𝘢𝘣𝘭𝘦, 𝘪𝘵 𝘤𝘢𝘯𝘯𝘰𝘵 𝘣𝘦 𝘴𝘢𝘪𝘥 𝘵𝘩𝘢𝘵 𝘵𝘩𝘦 𝘢𝘴𝘺𝘭𝘶𝘮 𝘪𝘴 𝘢 𝘱𝘰𝘱𝘶𝘭𝘢𝘳 𝘪𝘯𝘴𝘵𝘪𝘵𝘶𝘵𝘪𝘰𝘯. [𝘈𝘴 𝘴𝘰𝘰𝘯 𝘢𝘴] 𝘢 𝘔𝘢𝘭𝘢𝘺 𝘭𝘦𝘱𝘦𝘳 𝘵𝘩𝘪𝘯𝘬𝘴 𝘩𝘦 [𝘸𝘪𝘭𝘭 𝘣𝘦 𝘴𝘦𝘯𝘵 𝘵𝘰] 𝘗𝘢𝘯𝘨𝘬𝘰𝘳 𝘓𝘢𝘶𝘵 𝘩𝘦 𝘨𝘦𝘯𝘦𝘳𝘢𝘭𝘭𝘺 𝘥𝘪𝘴𝘢𝘱𝘱𝘦𝘢𝘳𝘴, 𝘶𝘴𝘶𝘢𝘭𝘭𝘺 𝘵𝘰 𝘒𝘦𝘥𝘢𝘩." In the 1930s a new facility to treat leprosy was built in Sungei Buloh in Selangor – and then the old "colony" was phased out.

During World War II, the island was where Freddie Spencer Chapman made his submarine getaway during the Japanese occupation of Malaya. Luciano Pavarotti visited the island in 1994 and he declared the island a paradise. In 2002 Pavarotti officiated the opening of Spa Village, a spa facility attached to the Pangkor Laut Resort, with the unveiling of a plaque commemorating the event .
