= Brunei dollar =

Currency of Brunei Darussalam

Dolar Brunei (Malay); Ringgit Brunei (Malay); ريڠڬيت بروني (Malay)
New 1 dollar polymer note (2011)
New 5 dollar polymer note (2011)

ISO 4217
- Code: BND (numeric: 096)
- Subunit: 0.01

Units of account
- Symbol: $, B$
- Subunit
- 1/100: sen

Denominations
- Banknotes
- Freq. used: $1, $5, $10, $50, $100, $500, $1000
- Rarely used: $20 (Commemorative); $25 (Commemorative); $50 (Commemorative); $10,000 (discontinued, still legal tender)
- Coins
- Freq. used: 5, 10, 20, 50 sen
- Rarely used: 1 sen (still minted)

Demographics
- Date of introduction: 1967
- User(s): Brunei; Singapore

Issuance
- Central bank: Brunei Darussalam Central Bank
- Website: bdcb.gov.bn

Valuation
- Inflation: 0.2% as of 2017
- Pegged with: Singapore dollar at par

The Brunei dollar (Malay: Dolar Brunei, (Note: As per the 2024 series banknotes entered circulation since 9 March 2026.) formerly Ringgit Brunei; sign: B$; currency code: BND), is the currency of Brunei Darussalam since 1967. It is normally abbreviated with the dollar sign $, or alternatively B$ to distinguish it from other dollar-denominated currencies. The currency is divided into 100 cents (sen) and is issued by the Brunei Darussalam Central Bank.

Under the Currency Interchangeability Agreement in 1967, the Brunei dollar is interchangeable with the Singapore dollar at par. As such, the Brunei dollar is accepted in Singapore as "customary tender"; likewise, the Singapore dollar is accepted in Brunei.

== History ==
Early currency in Brunei included cowrie shells. Brunei is also famous for its bronze teapots, which were used as currency in barter trade along the coast of northern Borneo. The Spanish-American silver dollar brought over by the Manila galleons was in wide use for Brunei's international trade from the 16th to 19th centuries; the 19th century Straits dollar was itself derived from the same coin.

Brunei issued tin coins denominated in pitis in AH1285 (AD1868). These were followed by a one cent coin in AH1304 (AD1888). This cent was one hundredth of a Straits dollar.

As a protectorate of Britain in the early 20th century, Brunei used the Straits dollar from 1906, the Malayan dollar from 1939 and the Malaya and British Borneo dollar from 1953 until 1967, when it began issuing its own currency.

The Brunei dollar replaced the Malaya and British Borneo dollar in 1967 after the formation of Malaysia and the independence of Singapore. Until 23 June 1973, the Malaysian ringgit was exchangeable at par with the Singapore dollar and Brunei dollar. The Monetary Authority of Singapore and the Brunei Currency and Monetary Board (now the Authoriti Monetari Brunei Darussalam (Monetary Authority of Brunei Darussalam)) still maintain the exchangeability of their two currencies. The dollar is accepted as "customary tender" in Singapore according to the Currency Interchangeability Agreement, although it is not legal tender there.

=== History of coins used in Brunei ===
Coins were used in Brunei from the 10th century. The Straits dollar was also used in Brunei from 1906.

Due to the close ties between China and Brunei, the first type of coins used in Brunei were Chinese coins. This was initially called 'Pitis'. They were later known as 'Kue' when local 'Pitis' were introduced. The local 'Pitis' coins had 'Sultanate of Brunei' stamped in front of the coin and the royal umbrella was imprinted at the back. These were issued from the 16th to the 19th century. Previous Islamic coins were also called the 'Pitis'. Another type of coin that was used in Brunei were 'Duit besi' (which roughly translates to 'Iron money'). Iron was considered valuable those days that it was used as money. 100 one-square inch pieces were valued at 1 dollar.

The last coin to be issued before the introduction of the Straits Settlements currency was the 'Duit Bintang', otherwise known as the 'Star coin' or the 'Star Cent'. It is called the Star coin because of the star imprinted on the obverse of the coin. It was minted in Birmingham, England, in 1887. It was made from copper.

With the introduction of the Straits Settlements currency, the previously used coins were taken out of circulation. They were, however still used with certain exchange rates.

Prior to 1984, the coins were made by the Royal Mint of the United Kingdom.

In 1984, Brunei Currency Board ordered four million circulation coins from the Singapore Mint. The circulation coins consisted of one cent coint in bronze and five, ten, twenty and fifty cents coins in cupro-nickel. The 50 cents has an additional security feature with a reeded edge with dots between lines at regular interval while other countries' circulation coins are mill-edged.

=== History of banknotes used in Brunei ===
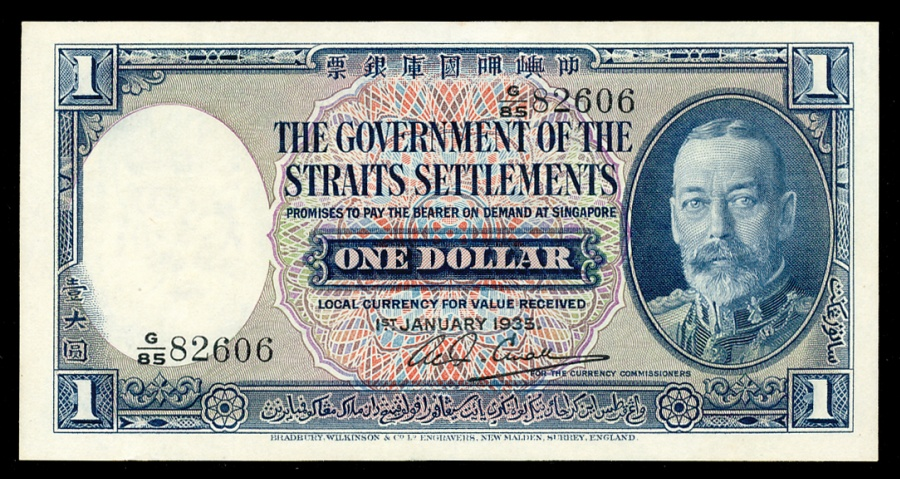
One Straits dollar banknote from 1935

The Straits dollar was introduced in Brunei in 1906. It was later replaced by the Malayan dollar which was introduced to British colonies and Brunei in 1939. It replaced the Straits dollar at par with a 1:1 exchange rate. The Malayan dollar was issued by the Board of Commissioners of Currency, Malaya. The board stopped issuing the Malayan dollar during the Japanese invasion during World War II. The Malayan dollar had the portrait of King George VI in front of the note.

In 1952, the board was renamed the Board of Commissioners of Currency, Malaya and British Borneo. The board then began to issue notes to Malaya, Singapore, Sarawak, British North Borneo, and Brunei in 1953. This was known as the Malaya and British Borneo dollar. In 1967, the Malaya and British Borneo dollar was replaced by three new currencies: the Malaysian dollar, Singapore dollar and the Brunei dollar, all at par. The Interchangeability Agreement which the three countries adhered to as original members of the currency union meant the Brunei dollar was exchangeable at par with the Singapore dollar and Malaysian dollar. This ended on 8 May 1973, when the Malaysian government withdrew from the agreement.

The Singapore dollar is still interchangeable with the Brunei dollar today.

== Coins ==
In 1967, coins were introduced in denominations of 1, 5, 10, 20 and 50 cents. Except for the bronze 1 cent, the coins were struck in cupro-nickel.

In 1986, copper-clad steel replaced bronze. Later, in 2008, the 1 cent coins switched compositions to brass.

== Banknotes ==
On 12 June 1967, the government (Kerajaan Brunei) introduced notes in denominations of 1, 5, 10, 50 and 100 dollars. Notes for 500 and 1,000 dollars followed in 1979. In 1989, the title on the paper money was changed to Negara Brunei Darussalam, the official name of the country, and the Malay term for "State of Brunei, Abode of Peace". 10,000 dollar notes were introduced the same year. All notes bear the denomination in Malay (in both Rumi and Jawi) and in English. The English denomination appeared on the obverse below the denomination in Malay on the earlier series, but now appears on the reverse together with the Jawi.

Five series of notes have been issued. The colours of $1, $5, and $10 notes have been the same for all the series of banknotes.

=== 1967 series ===
First series (1967) – currency with the portrait of Sultan Omar Ali Saifuddin III, the 28th ruler of Brunei.

- $1 – blue
- $5 – green
- $10 – red
- $50 – brown
- $100 – purple

=== 1972 series ===
Second series – This series was the same as the first series with exception that the portrait of Sultan Omar Ali Saifuddin was replaced by the portrait of Sultan Hassanal Bolkiah, the 29th and current ruler of Brunei. All subsequent currency has the portrait of Hassanal Bolkiah. In addition, two new higher denominations were issued in 1979.

1972 Series
Image		Value	Dimensions	Main Colour	Description			Date of issue	Issue suspended	Date of withdrawal
Obverse	Reverse	Value	Dimensions	Main Colour	Obverse	Reverse	Watermark	Date of issue	Issue suspended	Date of withdrawal
		$1	121 mm × 64 mm	Blue	Hassanal Bolkiah	Omar Ali Saifuddien Mosque 1967 series	Hassanal Bolkiah	1972	1989	Limited
		$5	127 mm × 71 mm	Green	Hassanal Bolkiah	Omar Ali Saifuddien Mosque 1967 series	Hassanal Bolkiah	1979	1989	Limited
		$10	133 mm × 79 mm	Red	Hassanal Bolkiah	Omar Ali Saifuddien Mosque 1967 series	Hassanal Bolkiah	1976	1989	Limited
		$50	146 mm × 87 mm	Olive green	Hassanal Bolkiah	Omar Ali Saifuddien Mosque 1967 series	Hassanal Bolkiah	1973	1989	Limited
		$100	159 mm × 95 mm	Purple	Hassanal Bolkiah	Omar Ali Saifuddien Mosque 1967 series	Hassanal Bolkiah	1972	1989	Limited
		$500	173 mm × 95 mm	Orange	Hassanal Bolkiah	Omar Ali Saifuddien Mosque (1979)	Hassanal Bolkiah	1979	1989	Limited
		$1,000	184 mm × 96 mm	Grey	Hassanal Bolkiah	Brunei Museum	Hassanal Bolkiah	1979	1989	Limited
For table standards, see the banknote specification table.

=== 1989 series ===
Third series – the post independence series. This series was gradually being replaced by the fourth series.

1989 Series
Image		Value	Dimensions	Main Colour	Description			Date of issue	Issue suspended	Date of withdrawal
Obverse	Reverse	Value	Dimensions	Main Colour	Obverse	Reverse	Watermark	Date of issue	Issue suspended	Date of withdrawal
		$1	125 mm × 63 mm	Blue	Hassanal Bolkiah	Aerial view of Kampong Ayer	Hassanal Bolkiah	1989	1996	Limited
		$5	133 mm × 66 mm	Green	Hassanal Bolkiah	Kampong Ayer & boats	Hassanal Bolkiah	1989	1996	Limited
		$10	141 mm × 69 mm	Red	Hassanal Bolkiah	Kampong Ayer & boats, Omar Ali Saifuddin Mosque	Hassanal Bolkiah	1989	1996	Limited
		$50	157 mm × 75 mm	Olive green	Hassanal Bolkiah	Long Boats, Kampong Ayer	Hassanal Bolkiah	1989	1996	Limited
		$100	165 mm × 78 mm	Purple	Hassanal Bolkiah	Aerial view of Kampong Ayer, Bandar Seri Begawan	Hassanal Bolkiah	1989	1996	Limited
		$500	175 mm × 81 mm	Orange	Hassanal Bolkiah	Padian woman paddling in her boat in Kampong Ayer	Hassanal Bolkiah	1989	2000	Limited
		$1,000	182 mm × 84 mm	Dark pink	Hassanal Bolkiah	Kampong Ayer, Istana Nurul Iman	Hassanal Bolkiah	1989	21 June 2007	Limited
		$10,000	204 mm × 134 mm	Green	Hassanal Bolkiah	Aerial view of Bandar Seri Begawan	Hassanal Bolkiah	1989	28 December 2006	Limited
For table standards, see the banknote specification table.							Hassanal Bolkiah			Limited

=== 1996–2000 polymer and paper series ===
Fourth Series (1996–2000) all notes except for the polymer issues are no longer printed.

1996 Polymer and Paper Notes
Image		Value	Dimensions	Main Colour	Description			Date of issue	Material
Obverse	Reverse	Value	Dimensions	Main Colour	Obverse	Reverse	Window / Watermark	Date of issue	Material
		$1	141 x 69 mm	Blue	Sultan Hassanal Bolkiah	Rainforest Waterfall	Coat of Arms of Brunei (Transparent window)	1996	Polymer
		$5	141 x 69 mm	Green	Sultan Hassanal Bolkiah	Rainforest Floor	Coat of Arms of Brunei (Transparent window)	1996	Polymer
		$10	141 x 69 mm	Red	Sultan Hassanal Bolkiah	Rainforest Canopy	Coat of Arms of Brunei (Transparent window)	1996	Polymer
		$50	158 x 75 mm	Brown, Green and Blue	Sultan Hassanal Bolkiah	Oil Rig	Sultan Hassanal Bolkiah (Watermark)	1996	Paper
		$100	158 x 75 mm	Brown, Orange	Sultan Hassanal Bolkiah	Brunei International Airport	Sultan Hassanal Bolkiah (Watermark)	1996	Paper
		$500	175 x 81 mm	Orange	Sultan Hassanal Bolkiah	Royal Regalia Building	Sultan Hassanal Bolkiah (Watermark)	2000	Paper
For table standards, see the banknote specification table.

=== Polymer series (2004–2007) ===
Polymer banknotes were introduced in 2004 due to high cases of banknote forgery, with all the new banknotes being in the same substrate. Denominations of 50, 100, 500, 1,000 and 10,000 were issued from 2004 to 2007. The $100 note of this series won a gold medal award for its security features in the 22nd National Print Award in Australia in May 2005.

The S$10,000 and B$10,000 notes are the world's most valuable banknotes, (worth US$7,771 as of April 2026) that are officially in circulation. They are worth eight times as much as the next most valuable, the 1,000 Swiss franc note (US$1,100). From 6 November 2020, AMBD has announced it will stop printing B$10,000 notes to reduce the risk of money laundering. Brunei has also stopped the issuance of B$10,000 and is in the process of withdrawing it from active circulation.

2004–2007 Polymer Notes
Image		Value	Dimensions	Main Colour	Description			Date of	
Obverse	Reverse	Value	Dimensions	Main Colour	Obverse	Reverse	Transparent Window	printing	issue
		$50	158 x 75 mm	Olive green	Sultan Hassanal Bolkiah	Tropical Shrub	Various different flora of Brunei	15 July 2004; Hassanal Bolkiah's 58th birthday	
		$100	158 x 75 mm	Brown	Sultan Hassanal Bolkiah	Chermin Island	Various different flora of Brunei	15 July 2004; Hassanal Bolkiah's 58th birthday	
		$500	175 x 81 mm	Pink	Sultan Omar Ali Saifuddien III	Pusat Bandar	Various different flora of Brunei	2006	28 December 2006
		$1,000	182 x 84 mm	Turqouise	Sultan Hassanal Bolkiah	The Ministry of Finance Building in Bandar Seri Begawan	Various different flora of Brunei	2006	21 June 2007
		$10,000	180 x 90 mm	Green	Sultan Hassanal Bolkiah	The Legislative Council (Parliament) Building in Bandar Seri Begawan	Various different flora of Brunei	2006	28 December 2006
For table standards, see the banknote specification table.

=== Polymer series (2011) ===
To commemorate the 65th birthday of Sultan Hassanal Bolkiah, an upgraded versions of the 1, 5 and 10 dollar banknotes were issued. Shortly after the notes were issued, the Braille dots on the upper left front corner of the new polymer notes are not raised. The Braille dots cannot be felt tactilely, and they are not accurately rendered as Braille numbers corresponding to the denominations. Specifically, the spacing of the dots is wrong, and they lack the lead-in character that indicates that numbers follow.

Polymer series (2011)
Image	Value	Dimensions (mm)	Main colour	Description		Issued from	Issue suspended
Image	Value	Dimensions (mm)	Main colour	Obverse	Reverse	Issued from	Issue suspended
	$1	141 × 69	Blue	Hassanal Bolkiah; Dillenia suffruticosa	Bandar Seri Begawan	18 July 2011	Current
	$5	141 × 69	Lime green	Hassanal Bolkiah; Curcuma longa	Lapau	18 July 2011	Current
	$10	141 × 69	Red	Hassanal Bolkiah; Cosmos caudatus	Jame' Asr Hassanil Bolkiah Mosque	18 July 2011	Current
For table standards, see the banknote specification table.							Current

=== New Family banknote series (2026) ===
On 22 September 2025, the Brunei Darussalam Central Bank unveiled a new series of banknotes, consisting of denominations of BND1, BND5, BND10, BND100, and BND500. The banknotes are denominated in dolar Brunei. They will enter circulation in early 2026.

New family banknote series (2026)
Image	Value	Dimensions (mm)	Main colour	Description		Issued from	Issue suspended
Image	Value	Dimensions (mm)	Main colour	Obverse	Reverse	Issued from	Issue suspended
	$1	141 × 69	Blue	Hassanal Bolkiah; Dillenia suffruticosa	Bandar Seri Begawan	2026	Upcoming
	$5	141 × 69	Lime green	Hassanal Bolkiah; Curcuma longa	Lapau	2026	Upcoming
	$10	141 × 69	Red	Hassanal Bolkiah; Cosmos caudatus	Jame' Asr Hassanil Bolkiah Mosque	2026	Upcoming
	$100	158 × 75	Brown	Hassanal Bolkiah; Melastoma malabathricum	Chermin Island	2026	Upcoming
	$500	175 × 81	Pink	Omar Ali Saifuddien III; Orthosiphon aristatus	Pusat Bandar	2026	Upcoming
For table standards, see the banknote specification table.

=== Commemorative banknotes ===
- $25 – purple and beige (1992)

This was issued during the silver jubilee (25th anniversary) of Sultan Hassanal Bolkiah acceding to the throne. The design is of the 1989 series of currency.

- $20 – yellow (polymer, 2007)

On 27 June 2007, Singapore and Brunei celebrated the 40th anniversary of the Currency Interchangeability Agreement (since 12 June 1967) by joint-issuing commemorative $20 notes.

The two authorities issue distinct versions of the new $20 notes. They are both yellow, 149 × 72 mm in size, and made of polymer. The reverses are almost identical except that the Brunei version has their state title in Jawi script, while the Singaporean version has the state title of Brunei in Latin script. The obverse of the Singaporean version is similar to the current Portrait Series, whereas the obverse of the Brunei version is similar to the $50 and $100 of the 2004 series.

There is a limited edition set, which consists of both versions in a folder, with matching serial number. The notes have "40th Anniversary Currency Interchangeability Agreement" overprinted on obverse. In addition, the Singaporean version has the two countries' state crests above the commemorative text. Only 12,000 sets are available, 10,000 from the Monetary Authority of Singapore, and 2,000 from the Brunei Currency and Monetary Board.

The circulation version has been available since 16 July 2007.

- $50 - yellow (polymer, 2017)

In 2017, both Brunei and Singapore issued $50 polymer banknotes in commemoration of the 50th Anniversary of its Currency Interchangeability Agreement.

- $50 - yellow (polymer, 2017)

In 2017, the Autoriti Monetari Brunei Darussalam issued a $50 polymer banknote, alongside a 50 cent coin, to commemorate the 50th anniversary of Sultan Hassan al-Bolkiah's accession to the throne. On the front it depicts the monarch's coronation alongside a portrait of Sultan Hassanal Bolkiah. One notable security feature of the note is the use of an optically variable ink called "spark live".

Current BND exchange rates
From Google Finance:	AUD CAD CHF CNY EUR GBP HKD JPY USD IDR MYR
From Yahoo! Finance:	AUD CAD CHF CNY EUR GBP HKD JPY USD IDR MYR
From XE.com:	AUD CAD CHF CNY EUR GBP HKD JPY USD IDR MYR
From OANDA:	AUD CAD CHF CNY EUR GBP HKD JPY USD IDR MYR

== See also ==
- Economy of Brunei
- Brunei pitis

== Notes ==
Preceded by: Malaya and British Borneo dollar Reason: Currency Agreement; Ratio: at par, or 60 dollars = 7 British pounds	Currency of Brunei, Singapore; 1967 – Concurrent with: Singapore dollar	Succeeded by: Current
