= Coins of the Brunei dollar =

Physical form of Brunei subcurrency

The coins of the Brunei dollar are part of the physical form of current Brunei currency, the Brunei dollar. They have changed through time along with Brunei itself. A British protectorate from 1888 until 1983, it is currently an independent member of the Commonwealth of Nations.

== First Series ==
The decision was taken to adopt a native Bruneian currency called the Brunei dollar (or ringgit Brunei in Malay), which is divided into 100 cents (or sen in Malay). The portrait of the then Sultan, Omar Ali Saifuddin III (ruled 1950–1967), is depicted on the obverse. The reverse of these coins, and all subsequent series, was designed by Christopher Ironside OBE. The coins issued were 1, 5, 10, 20, and 50 sen.

First Series (1967)
Value	Technical parameters			Description		
Value	Diameter	Mass	Composition	Edge	Obverse	Reverse
1 cent	17.70 mm	1.24 g	Copper-plated zinc	Plain	Sultan and Yang Di-Pertuan of Brunei Omar Ali Saifuddien III	Year, Local design and said to represent flower or group of blossoms
5 cents	16.26 mm	1.56 g	Aluminium bronze	Reeded	Sultan and Yang Di-Pertuan of Brunei Omar Ali Saifuddien III	Year, Tree-shaped local design and said to represent a bird
10 cents	19.40 mm	2.6 g	Cupronickel	Reeded	Sultan and Yang Di-Pertuan of Brunei Omar Ali Saifuddien III	Year, Claw-shaped local design and said to represent an animal
20 cents	23.50 mm	4.5 g	Cupronickel	Reeded	Sultan and Yang Di-Pertuan of Brunei Omar Ali Saifuddien III	Year, A vertical oblong pattern based on local design and said to represent a tree
50 cents	27.70 mm	7.29 g	Cupronickel	Reeded	Sultan and Yang Di-Pertuan of Brunei Omar Ali Saifuddien III	Year, Coat of Arms
For table standards, see the coin specification table.

== Second Series ==
Sultan Hassanal Bolkiah acceded to the throne upon the abdication of his father in late 1967. The title of the Sultan is given as SULTAN HASSANAL BOLKIAH I. The same denominations as the 1967 coinage were retained and are still being struck. Commemorative coins of $1 through to $1,000 were struck in this period.

Second Series (1968-1977)
Value	Technical parameters			Description		
Value	Diameter	Mass	Composition	Edge	Obverse	Reverse
1 cent	17.70 mm	1.24 g	Copper-plated zinc	Plain	Sultan and Yang Di-Pertuan of Brunei Hassanal Bolkiah	Year, Local design and said to represent flower or group of blossoms
5 cents	16.26 mm	1.56 g	Aluminium bronze	Reeded	Sultan and Yang Di-Pertuan of Brunei Hassanal Bolkiah	Year, Tree-shaped local design and said to represent a bird
10 cents	19.40 mm	2.6 g	Cupronickel	Reeded	Sultan and Yang Di-Pertuan of Brunei Hassanal Bolkiah	Year, Claw-shaped local design and said to represent an animal
20 cents	23.50 mm	4.5 g	Cupronickel	Reeded	Sultan and Yang Di-Pertuan of Brunei Hassanal Bolkiah	Year, A vertical oblong pattern based on local design and said to represent a tree
50 cents	27.70 mm	7.29 g	Cupronickel	Reeded	Sultan and Yang Di-Pertuan of Brunei Hassanal Bolkiah	Year, Coat of Arms
For table standards, see the coin specification table.

== Third Series ==
The title of the Sultan was changed to SULTAN HASSANAL BOLKIAH. In 1977, coins were struck with I and without I in the Sultan's title. Brunei became a fully independent member of the Commonwealth of Nations on January 1, 1984.

Third Series (1977-1992)
Value	Technical parameters			Description		
Value	Diameter	Mass	Composition	Edge	Obverse	Reverse
1 cent	17.70 mm	1.24 g	Copper-plated zinc	Plain	Sultan and Yang Di-Pertuan of Brunei Hassanal Bolkiah	Year, Local design and said to represent flower or group of blossoms
5 cents	16.26 mm	1.56 g	Aluminium bronze	Reeded	Sultan and Yang Di-Pertuan of Brunei Hassanal Bolkiah	Year, Tree-shaped local design and said to represent a bird
10 cents	19.40 mm	2.6 g	Cupronickel	Reeded	Sultan and Yang Di-Pertuan of Brunei Hassanal Bolkiah	Year, Claw-shaped local design and said to represent an animal
20 cents	23.50 mm	4.5 g	Cupronickel	Reeded	Sultan and Yang Di-Pertuan of Brunei Hassanal Bolkiah	Year, A vertical oblong pattern based on local design and said to represent a tree
50 cents	27.70 mm	7.29 g	Cupronickel	Reeded	Sultan and Yang Di-Pertuan of Brunei Hassanal Bolkiah	Year, Coat of Arms
For table standards, see the coin specification table.

== Fourth Series ==
An entirely new portrait depicting the Sultan facing forward was adopted. The title of the Sultan is now given as SULTAN HAJI HASSANAL BOLKIAH.

Fourth Series (1993-)
Image		Value	Technical parameters			Description		
Obverse	Reverse	Value	Diameter	Mass	Composition	Edge	Obverse	Reverse
		1 cent	17.70 mm	1.24 g	Copper-plated zinc	Plain	Sultan and Yang Di-Pertuan of Brunei Hassanal Bolkiah	Year, Local design and said to represent flower or group of blossoms
		5 cents	16.26 mm	1.56 g	Cupronickel	Reeded	Sultan and Yang Di-Pertuan of Brunei Hassanal Bolkiah	Year, Tree-shaped local design and said to represent a bird
		10 cents	19.40 mm	2.6 g	Cupronickel	Reeded	Sultan and Yang Di-Pertuan of Brunei Hassanal Bolkiah	Year, Claw-shaped local design and said to represent an animal
		20 cents	23.50 mm	4.5 g	Cupronickel	Reeded	Sultan and Yang Di-Pertuan of Brunei Hassanal Bolkiah	Year, A vertical oblong pattern based on local design and said to represent a tree
		50 cents	27.70 mm	7.29 g	Cupronickel	Reeded	Sultan and Yang Di-Pertuan of Brunei Hassanal Bolkiah	Year, Coat of Arms
For table standards, see the coin specification table.
