= Penang dollar =

Formerly used currency

The dollar was the currency of Penang between 1786 and 1826. It was subdivided into 100 cents, also called pice, and was equal to the Spanish dollar. The dollar was introduced after the East India Company acquired the island in 1786. In 1826, the Indian rupee was declared legal tender in Penang at a value of 48 pice. The dollar again became the currency of Penang with the introduction of the Straits dollar.

Between 1786 and 1788, coins were issued in denominations of 1/10, 1/2 and 1 cent (copper), 1/10, 1/4 and 1/2 dollar (silver). Large, tin 1 cent coins were issued between 1800 and 1809, followed by copper 1/2 and 1 cent in 1810. In 1826, copper 1/2, 1 and 2 cents coins were issued which were also minted in 1828, after the dollar had been replaced by the rupee. This was done under Company Rule to made trade with India and other rupee zone regions easier. Despite this however, Spanish Trade Dollars continued to dominate trade and were trusted by merchants. This resulted in the reintroduction of the Dollar as the Straits Dollar from 1898.
