= Dinding River =

River in Perak, Malaysia

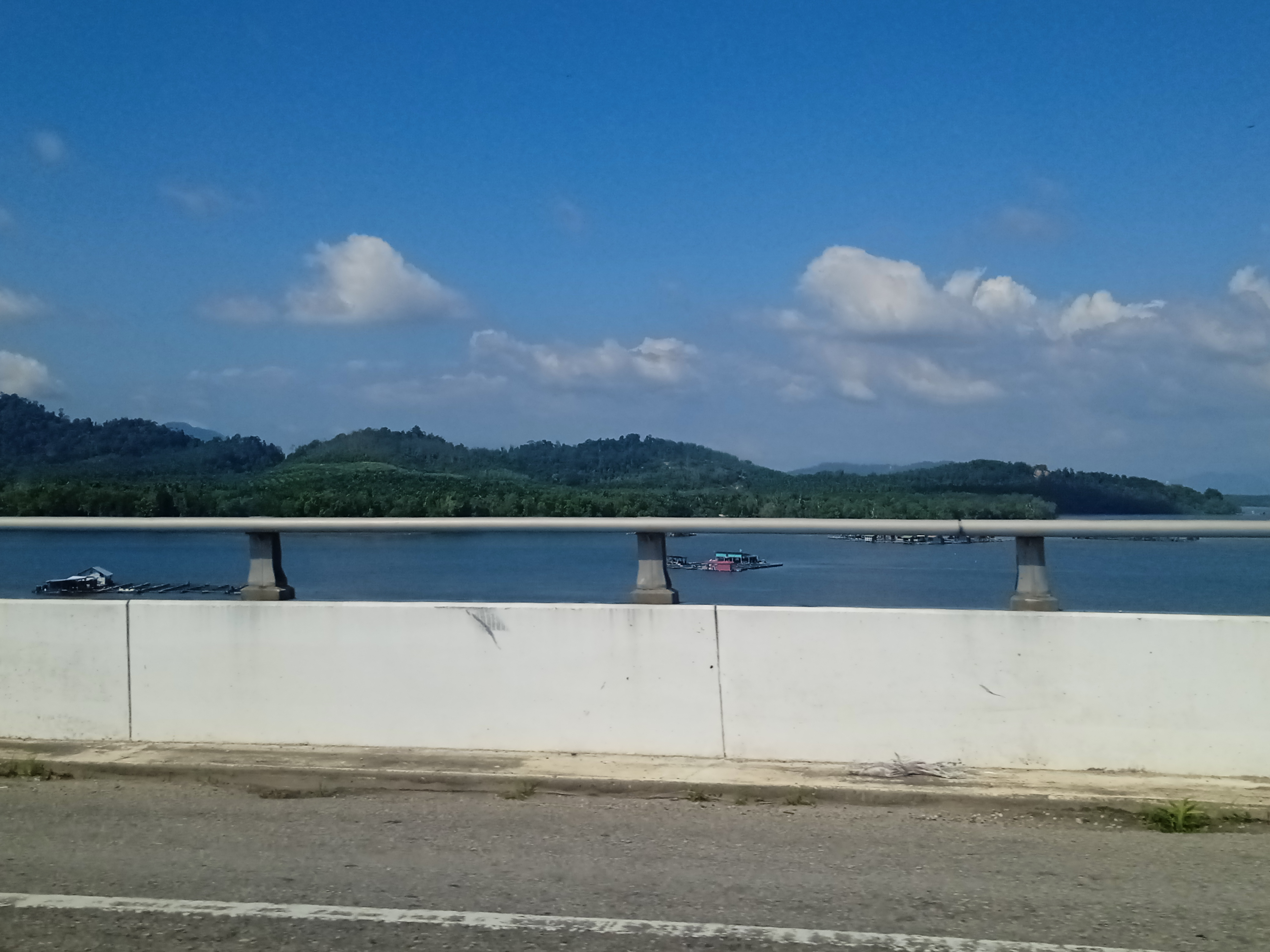
Dinding River, 2023

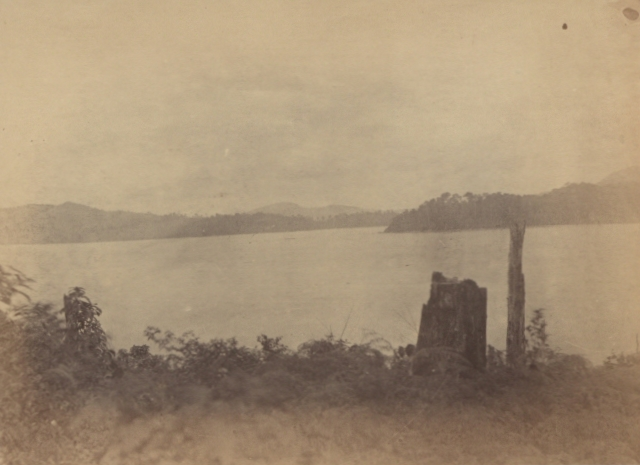
View of the mouth of Dinding river from the hill at Pulau Pangkor. Straits Settlements June 1874.

Dinding River (Malay: Sungai Dinding) is the major river in Manjung district in Perak, Malaysia.

== See also ==
- List of rivers of Malaysia
