= Pangkor Island =

Malaysian island

Native name: Pulau Pangkor ڤولاو ڤڠكور
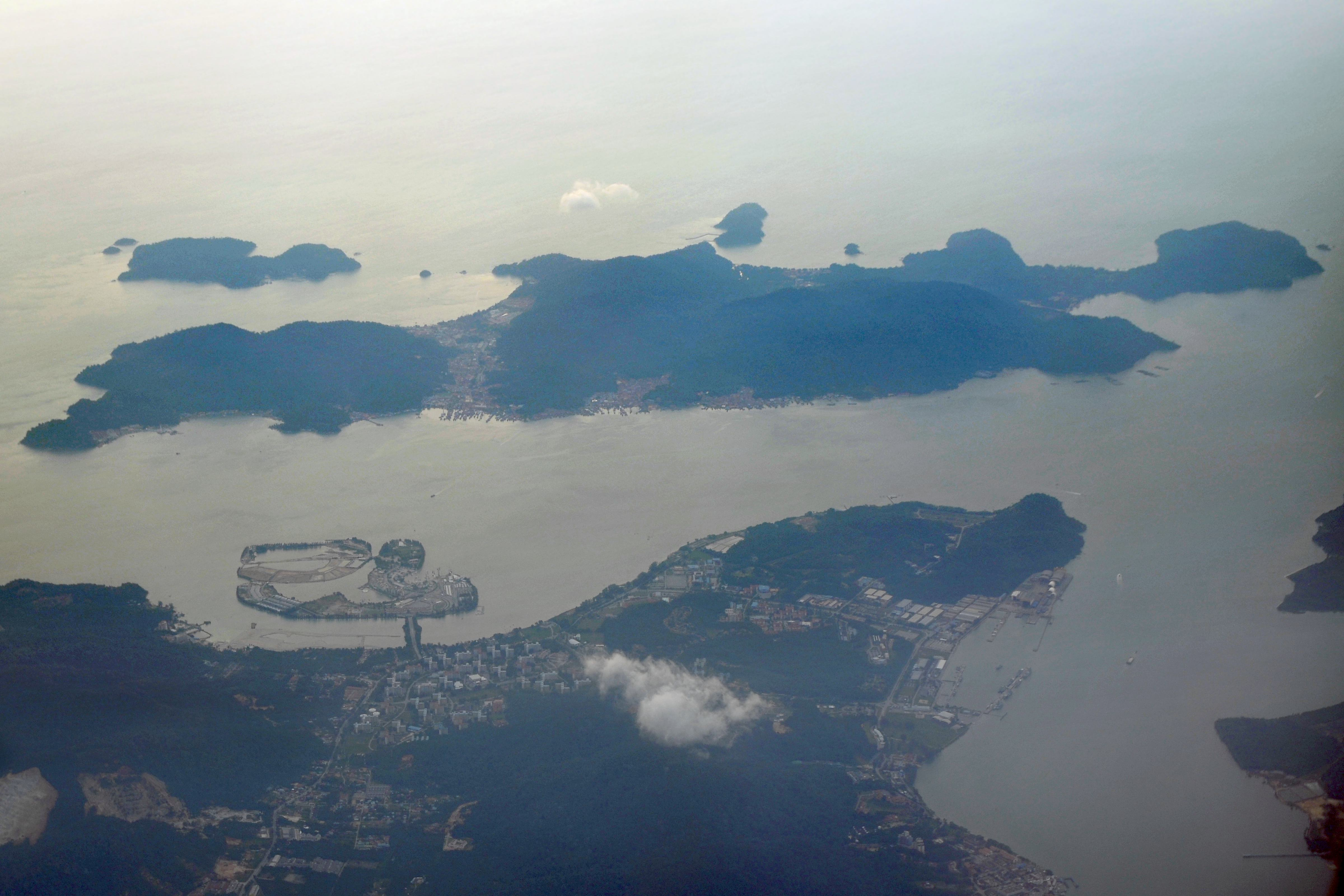
- Pangkor Island and Lumut from the east
- Interactive map of Pangkor Island

Geography
- Location: Strait of Malacca
- Coordinates: 4°13′12″N 100°33′18″E
- Archipelago: Pangkor Islands
- Area: 21.42 km^{2} (8.27 sq mi)

Administration
- Malaysia
- State: Perak
- District: Manjung
- Mukim: Lumut (Majority); Pasir Bogak Town (West); Sungai Pinang Kechil Town (East); Pangkor Town (East)

Demographics
- Population: 11,264 (2022)
- Ethnic groups: Chinese, Malays, Indian

Additional information
- Time zone: MST (UTC+8)
- Postal code: 32300

Pangkor Island (Malay: Pulau Pangkor; Chinese: 邦咯岛 Tamil: பங்கோர் தீவு) is an island in Manjung District, Perak, Malaysia. It has a population of approximately 10,000. Nearby islands include Pangkor Laut Island, Giam Island, Mentagor Island, Simpan Island, and Tukun Terindak Island. The major industries of the island are tourism and fishing.

== Geography ==
Pangkor Island has a land area of 18 km^{2} (6.9 sq mi) and is 3.5 kilometres (2.2 mi) from Peninsular Malaysia. The interior of the island is forested and is home to 65 reptile species, 17 amphibian species, and 82 total herpetofaunal species. The locals are mainly Kedahan-speaking Malays and Hokkien and Teochew Chinese, with Kedah Malay, Hokkien, Teochew, Mandarin Chinese and Malaysian Tamil being main languages.

== History ==
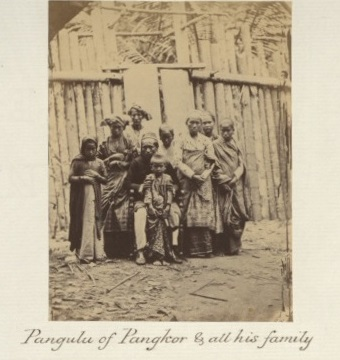
Pangulu (village head) of Pangkor and all his family, in April 1874

Historically, Pangkor was a refuge for local fishers, merchants and pirates. In the 17th century, the Dutch built a fort to control the Perak tin trade, known as the Dutch Fort. In 1874, it was the location of a historical treaty between the British government and a contender for the Perak throne (the Pangkor Treaty), which began the British colonial domination of the Malay Peninsula. The old British name for the Pangkor Island group was the Dindings.

Batu Gong is a petroglyph (rock carving) of an unknown age located on a headland at Pantai Pasir Bogak depicting a gong, first mentioned by G. De. G Sieveking in the Asiatic society journal in 1951 is 100 cm (39 in) in diameter and is oriented directly north.

A passenger jetty, located near Pasir Bogar, was completed in late 1959, costing RM 150,000.

In 2003, Marina Island (an artificial island) was developed by the Marina Island Group of companies and began operation in 2010, with private investment of RM250 million by 2013. The integrated mixed development resort island consists of waterfront residential properties, a new jetty (Marina Island Jetty), a private commercial marina called Pangkor Marina Malaysia, service apartments, hotels and shop offices. The jetty has a ferry service that connects to the island.

2004-2014 was a period of high growth and development for the island and the surrounding district. In 2006, a biotechnology centre, a joint venture of Global Hi-Q Malaysia S/B and Hi-Q Bio-Tech International (Taiwan) Ltd began operations with initial investments of 100 million ringgit (US$30 million). Their operations include fish farming and aquaculture, and the first harvest was in 2009.

== Demographics ==
Pangkor has a population of 11,264 and is one of the few inhabited islands in Malaysia with a Chinese-majority population. Chinese residents comprise 54% of the island's population, followed by Malays (38%) and Indians (8%). The population is concentrated in several settlements, including Pangkor Town, which is 54% Chinese, 25% Malay, and 21% Indian; Sungai Pinang Besar (54% Chinese, 41% Malay, 5% Indian); Sungai Pinang Kechil, an overwhelmingly Chinese settlement with 94% Chinese, 5% Malay, and 1% Indian residents; and Telok Gedong, which is almost entirely Malay at 99% Malays and 1% Indian. These settlements collectively contribute to Pangkor's distinctive demographic character, making it one of the largest Chinese-majority communities among Malaysia's inhabited islands.

== Tourism ==
Following the Federal Government's move to grant the island duty-free status effective 1 January 2020, the island recorded a 40 percent increase in visitors. Manjung Municipal Council (MPM) recorded 1.42 million visitors to the island compared to 1.03 million in 2017.

== Transport ==
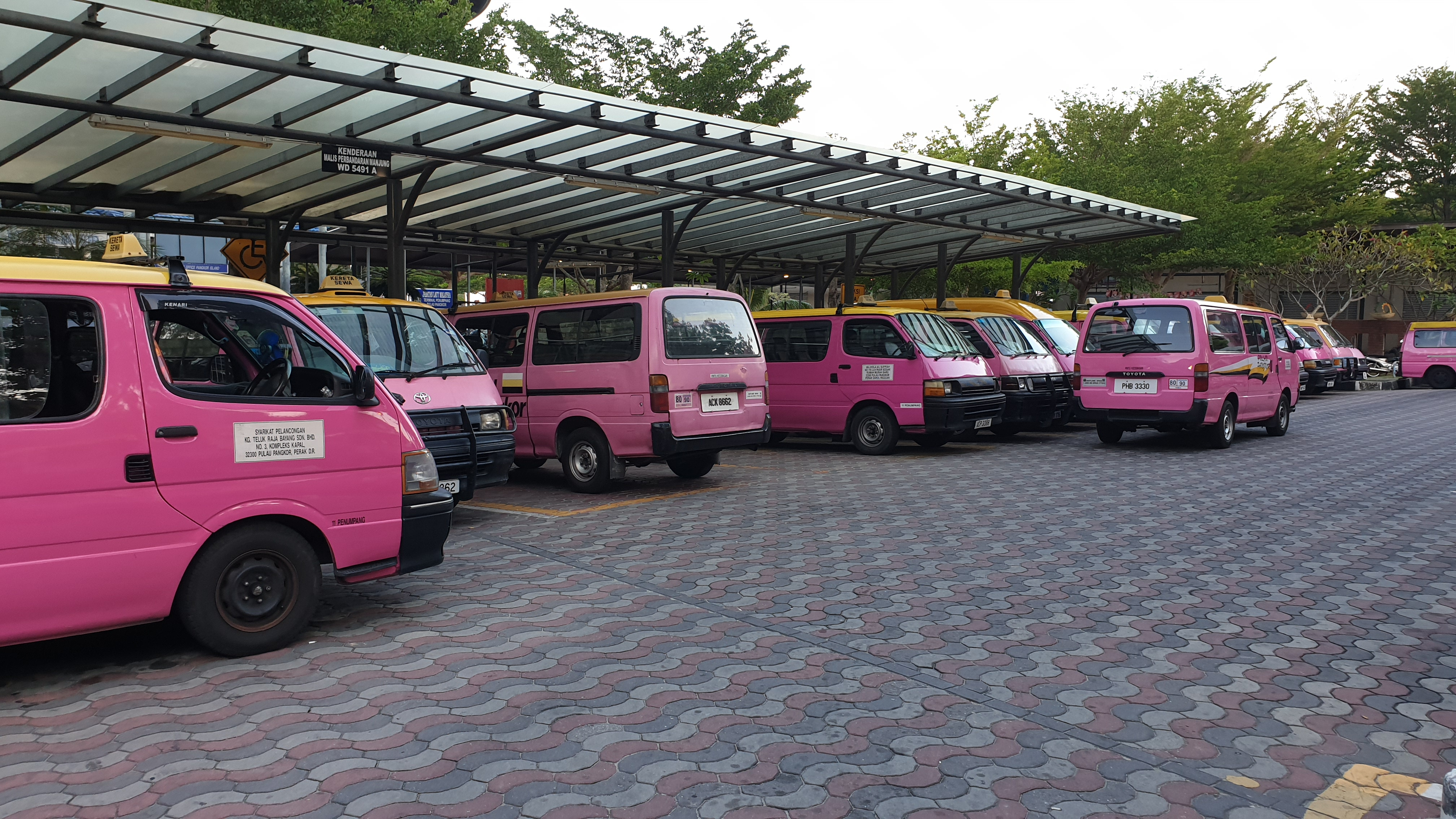
Pink tourist minibuses

Pangkor Island is a three-hour drive from Kuala Lumpur and is accessible through the Ipoh–Lumut 4-lane dual carriage highway and the West Coast Expressway. Buses frequently arrive at the main jetty in Lumut. No bridges connect the island to the mainland because a policy aimed to control the number of vehicles on the island to prevent road congestion.

Public ferries depart from Lumut to Pangkor Island from the old Lumut jetty. The ferry service stops at two jetties at the east side of Pangkor Island, Sungai Pinang Kecil; SPK jetty; and Pangkor Town Jetty.

There's a new ferry company from the mainland to the island which takes a shorter path compared to the regular ferry. It starts from Marina Bay and its fare is a little bit higher. Regular ferry from Lumut Jetty to Pangkor Island takes 30 to 40 minutes, while Marina Bay to Pangkor Island only takes 15 to 20 minutes.

The island is served by Pangkor Airport through charter air service by Berjaya Air and scheduled airline service from Subang Airport by SKS Airways.

== Notable places ==
The west coast of Pangkor is famous for its beaches, resorts and hotels for tourist accommodations. The famous beaches there include Pasir Bogak, Teluk Nipah and Coral Beach. The east coast of Pangkor is where all the residents live and where many of them work in the local foods and fisheries activities, including the dry fish factory, boat workshops, and a fish farm. Other attractions on the island include the Fu Ling Kong temple, the Sri Pathirakaliamman temple in Sungai Pinang Besar village; Batu Bersurat, Tiger Rock, the Dutch Fort (Kota Belanda), the tombs in Kampung Teluk Gedung and Tortoise Hill and Batu Gong.

== Climate ==
Pangkor Island is situated off Malaysia's west coast and experiences hot and humid weather all year round. The rainy season runs from April - October, and the dry season is from October - April.

== Gallery ==
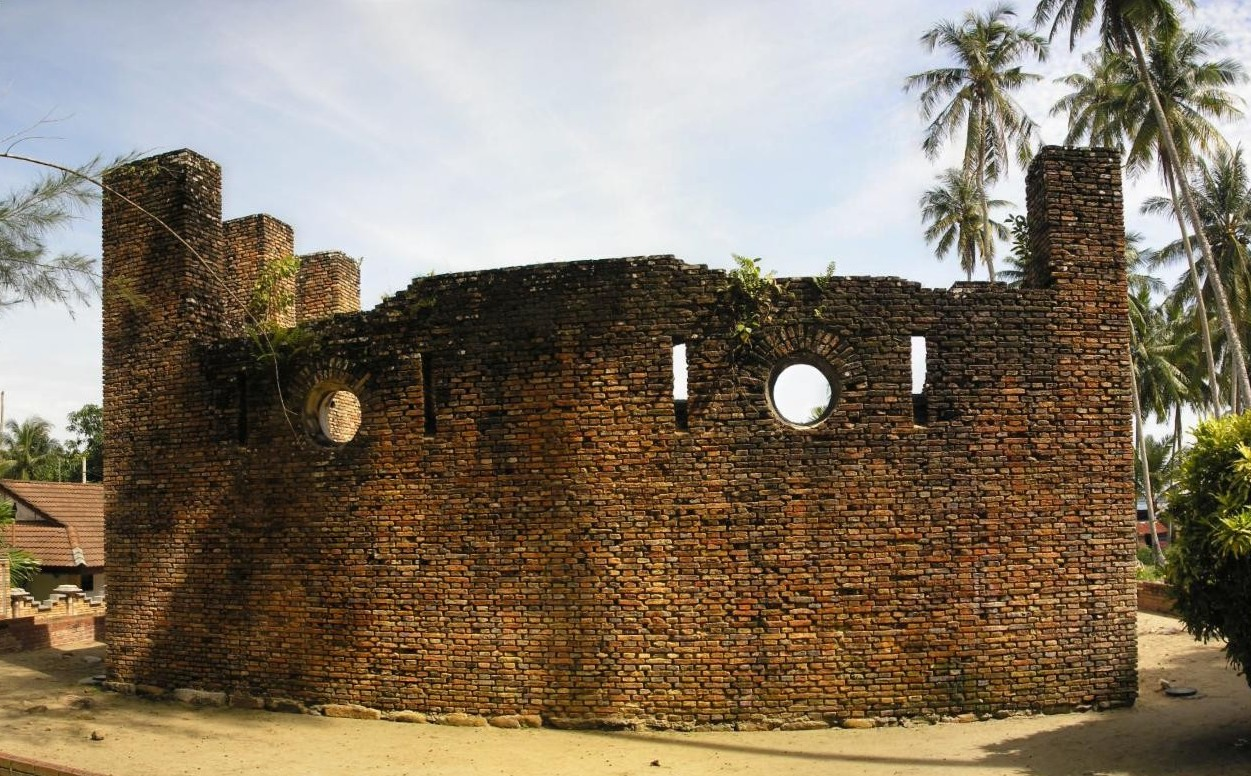
Dutch Fort on Pulau Pangkor

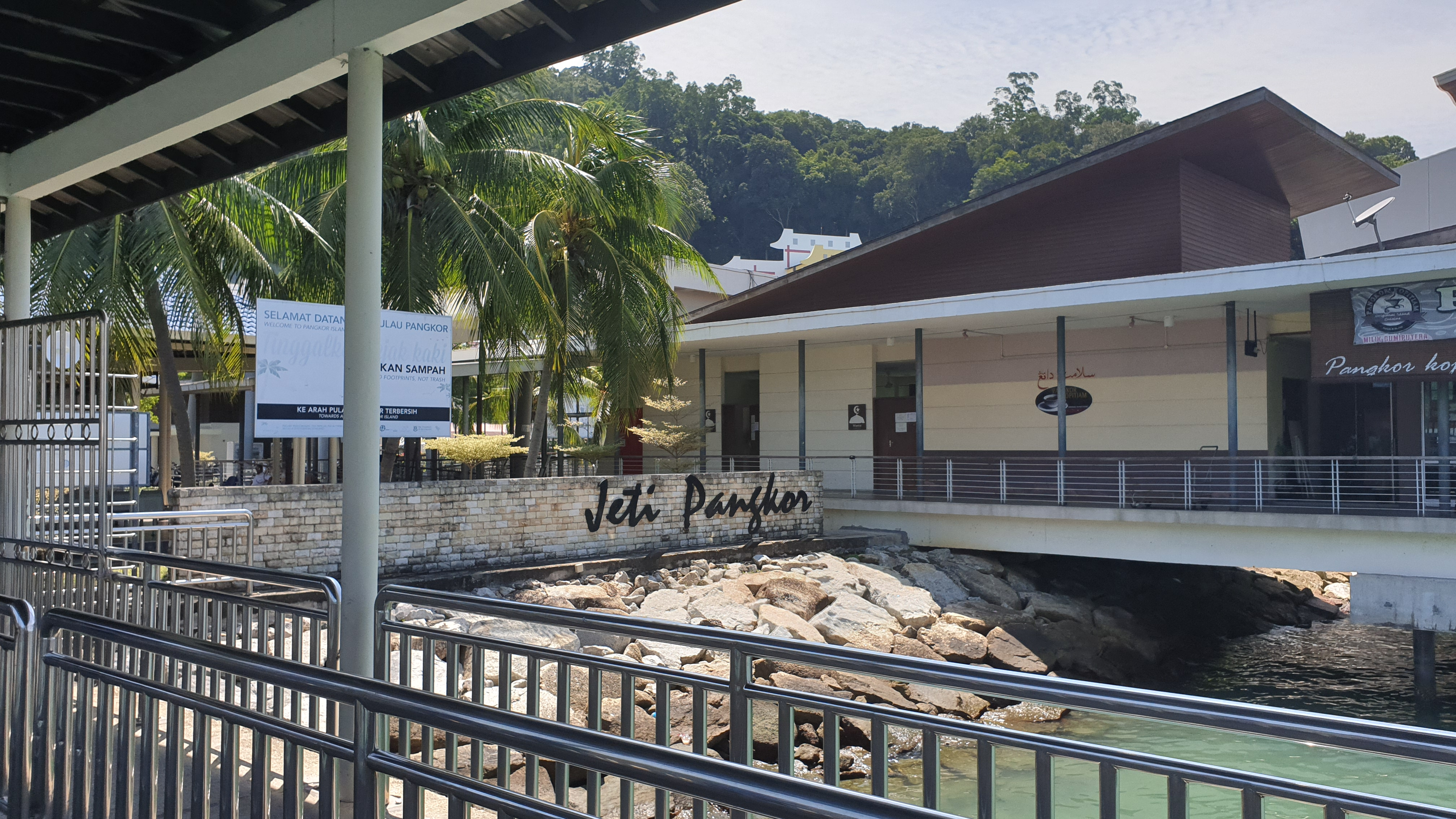
The main ferry terminal, serving the island

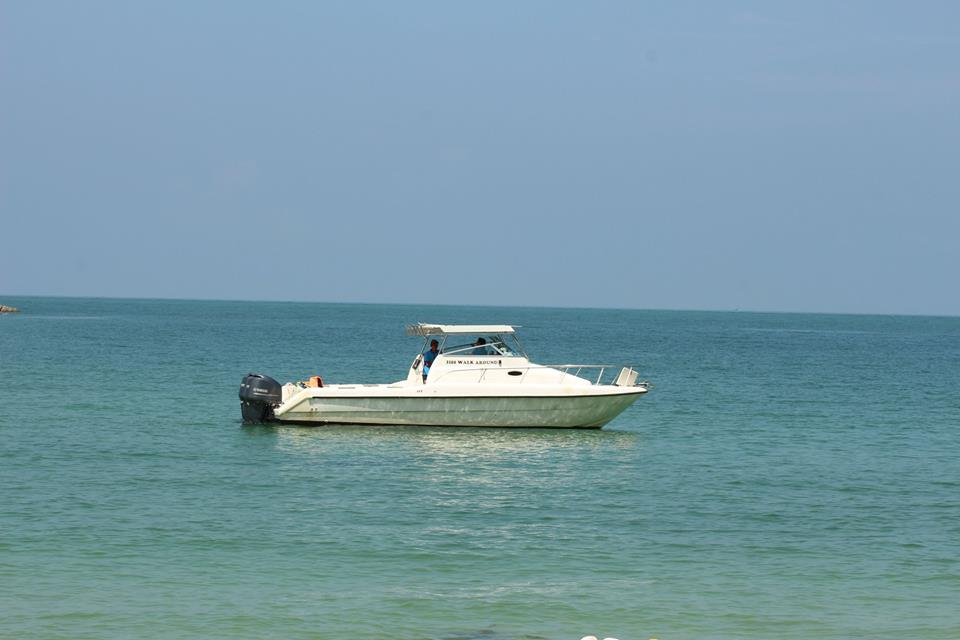
Pangkor Boat
