= Kelantan keping =

Former currency of Kelantan

The keping was the currency of Kelantan until 1909 when it was replaced by the Straits dollar. It was subdivided into 10 pitis. Coins were struck in tin in denominations of 1 pitis (holed), 1 and 10 keping.

One piti coins were made from tin, round in shape, smooth edged and holed. The coins were 18 mm in diameter with Arabic legend.

== See also ==
- Trengganu keping
