= Terengganu keping =

Formerly used currency

The keping was the currency of Terengganu until 1909 when it was replaced by the Straits dollar. It was subdivided into 10 pitis. Coins were issued in denominations of 1 pitis (tin), 1 keping (copper) and 10 keping (tin).

== See also ==
- Kelantan keping
