= Emblem of Brunei =

Emblem of Brunei Darussalam Panji-Panji Negara Brunei Darussalam
- National Emblem of Brunei
- Armiger: Hassanal Bolkiah, Sultan of Brunei
- Adopted: 1959
- Shield: Hands gules
- Motto: الدائمون المحسنون بالهدى (Arabic); Ad-dāʾimūna al-muḥsinūna bi-l-hudā 'Always in service with God's guidance'

The Emblem of Brunei is a national symbol that is also featured on the flag of Brunei. It was adopted in 1959. There are five main components to the national emblem: the flag, the royal parasol (ceremonial umbrella), the wings, the hands, and the crescent.

Below the crescent is a banner; both are inscribed with yellow lettering in Arabic:

- On the crescent, Brunei's national motto: الدائمون المحسنون بالهدى; Ad-dāʾimūna al-muḥsinūna bi-l-hudā, meaning "Always in service with God's guidance" (Malay: "Sentiasa membuat kebajikan dengan petunjuk Allah").
- On the banner (scroll), the state's name: بروني دارالسلام; Brunei Darussalam, literally "Brunei, the Abode of Peace".

== Design ==
All elements on the emblem are red. On some versions they have black outlines; others have colourless outlines.

1. The small swallowtail flag and parasol (payung ubor-ubor), regalia of the sultanate's monarchy, have been the royal insignia since the creation of the emblem. (See also: Chatra, religious parasol)
2. The wings symbolise protection of justice, tranquility, prosperity and peace.
3. Below these is the crescent, a symbol of Islam, the state religion of Brunei.
4. On the sides, the upturned hands indicate the government's duty is to preserve and promote the welfare of the citizens and to protect the people.

== Personal emblem of the Sultan ==
Personal emblem of the Sultan

After the Constitution was enacted in 1959 the Sultan of Brunei adopted a different emblem from the emblem of state, in that the two hands were superseded by two golden sejant cats (kuching emas).

At his coronation in 1968, Sultan Hassanal Bolkiah used a crown (mahkota) with an original design, based on the brocade turbans used by previous sultans. It is made of precious metal, decorated with pendilia and a sarpech consisting of a crescent-and-ten-pointed star and topped with a seven-pointed ornament. This design was incorporated into a highly elaborate achievement which was promulgated in 1999 as the personal emblem of Sultan Hassanal Bolkiah. It maintained the inscribed crescent, now vert, and the winged umbrella as core elements but with the Sultan's crown added over them. This set is surrounded by a garland of ears paddy or, with the word Allah (God) inscribed in Arabic script in chief. The crescent bears the opening verse of the surah Al-Mulk in Arabic: تَبَارَكَ الَّذِي بِيَدِهِ الْمُلْكُ; Tabāraka al-ladhī bi-yadihi al-mulku, meaning "Blessed is the One in Whose Hands rests all authority".^{[Quran 67:1]} On the yellow standard of the Sultan, the emblem is all red.

== Past emblems ==
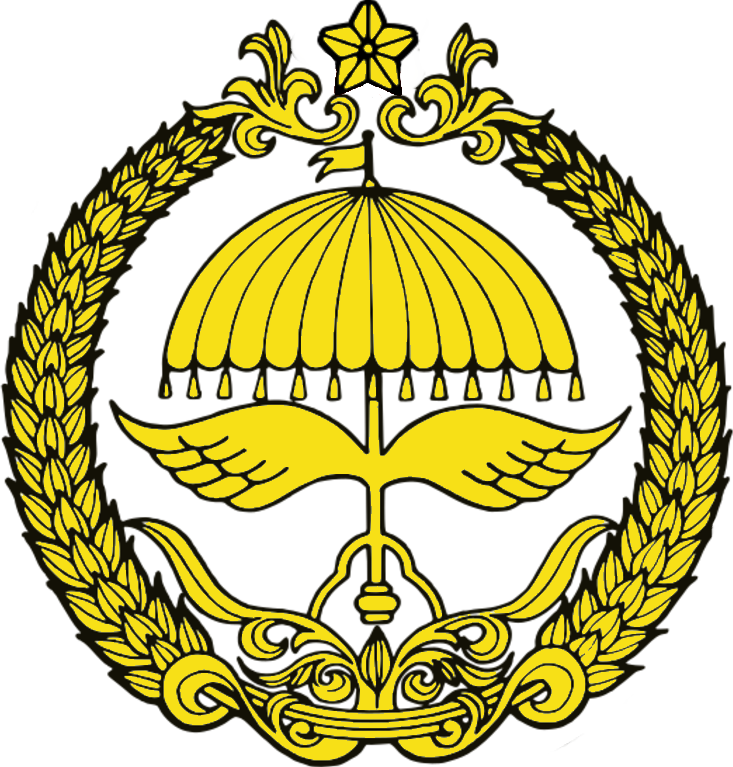
Emblem from 1828 to 1852

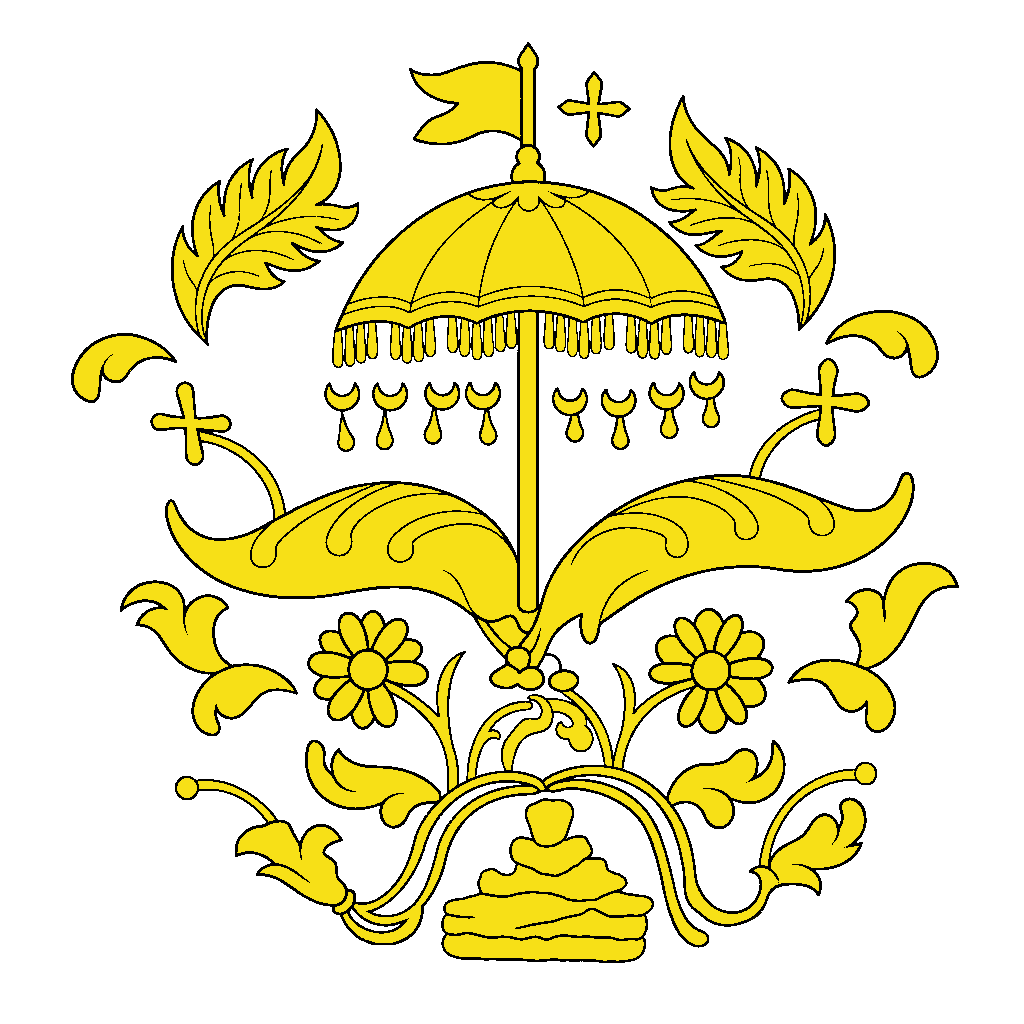
Emblem from 1852 to 1885

Emblem from 1932 to 1950

Emblem from 1951 to 1959

Emblem from 1959 to present

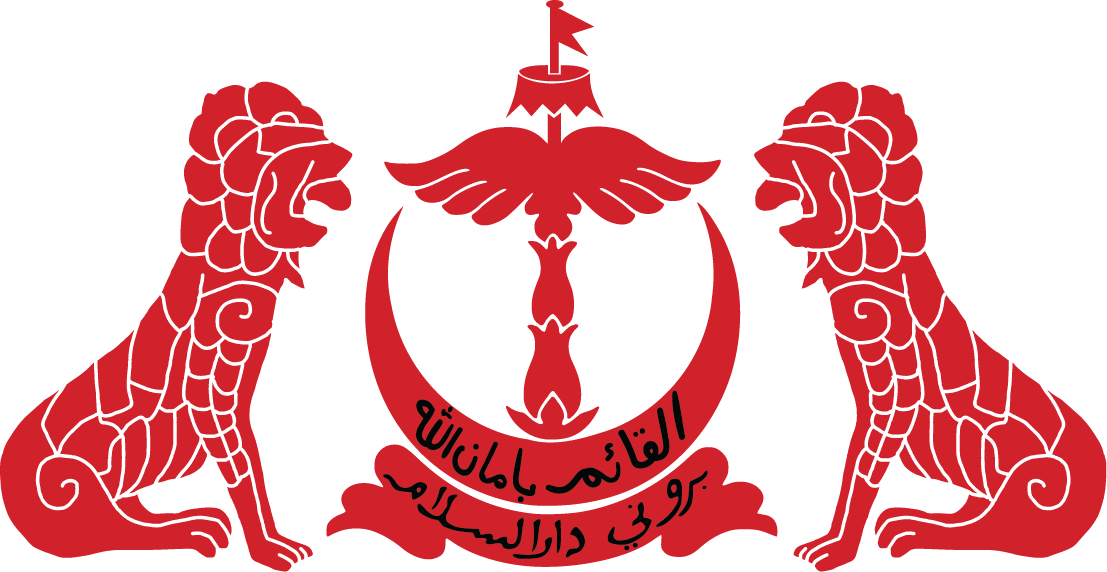
Emblem that was used before 1959 with motto (القاىٔم بامان الله, translated “The one who stands (or rules) by the protection of God”)
