= List of historical currencies =

This is a list of historical currencies.

== Ancient Mediterranean ==
=== Greece ===
- Aeginian stater (gold)
- Corinthian stater (silver)
- Aurous
- Athenian drachma (silver)
- Stater (silver)
- Tetradrachm (silver)
- Drachma (silver) OBOL (silver)
  - Alexandrian coinage
  - Ptolemaic coinage
  - Seleucid coinage
  - Bactrian coinage

=== Phoenicia ===
- Tyrian shekel

=== Lydia ===
- Stater (electrum and silver)
- Trite (coin) (electrum third of a stater)
- Hekte (electrum sixth of a stater)
  - Lydian coin

=== Egypt (Dynasty 30) ===
- Nefernub (Gold Stater)

=== Persia ===
- Daric (gold)
- Sigloi (silver)
  - Persian coinage
  - Persis coinage
  - Parthian coinage
  - Sassanian coinage
  - Elymais coinage

=== Carthage ===
- Litra
- Shekel

=== Etruscan ===
- As

=== Rome ===
- Antoninianus
- Argenteus (silver)
- As (copper)
- Aureus (gold)
- Denarius (silver)
- Dupondius (bronze)
- Follis
- Sestertius (bronze)
- Solidus (gold)
- Talent (silver, gold)
- Tremissis (gold)
  - Roman currency
  - Roman Imperial currency
  - Roman Republican currency

=== Israel ===
- Ma'ah (silver)
- Prutah (bronze/copper)
  - Yehud coinage
  - Hashmonean coinage
  - Herodian coinage
  - Roman Procurator coinage
  - First Jewish Revolt coinage
  - Judaea Capta coinage
  - Bar Kochba Revolt coinage
- Sheqel (silver)
- Zuz (silver)

=== Ancient Armenia ===
- Dahekan
- Dang
- Dram
- P'ogh
- Kartez
- Tagvorin

== Africa ==
- Ajuran currency
- Aksumite currency
- Mogadishu currency
- Dollar
  - Rhodesian dollar
  - Sierra Leonean dollar
  - Zimbabwean dollar
  - Zimbabwean dollar (2019–2024)
- Dinar – Sudan
- Ekwele (Ekuele) – Equatorial Guinea
- Escudo
  - Angolan escudo
  - Mozambican escudo
  - Portuguese Guinean escudo
  - São Tomé and Príncipe escudo
- Florin – Kenya, Somalia, Tanzania and Uganda
- Franc
  - Algerian franc
  - French Camerounian franc
  - Moroccan franc
  - Malagasy franc
  - Malian franc
- Katanga Cross – Zaire
- Lira
  - Italian East African lira
  - Italian Somaliland lira
  - Tripolitanian lira
- Metica – Mozambique
- Peseta – Equatorial Guinea
- Peso – Guinea-Bissau
- Pound
  - Biafran pound
  - British West African pound – Cameroon, Gambia, Ghana, Nigeria and Sierra Leone
  - Gambian pound
  - Ghanaian pound
  - Libyan pound
  - Malawian pound
  - Nigerian pound
  - Rhodesian pound
  - South African pound
  - Zambian pound
- Rial – Morocco
- Rupee – Kenya, Somalia, Tanzania and Uganda
- Shilling – Kenya, Somalia, Tanzania and Uganda
- Syli – Guinea
- Zaire – Zaire

== Americas ==
=== Pre-colonial ===
- Axe-money – Western Mesoamerica and Northern Andes
- Cocoa bean – Mesoamerica
- copper – Ojibway
- Cotton fabric – Mesoamerica

=== Post-contact ===
- Austral – Argentina
- Continental – Colonial America
- Cruzeiro, Cruzado – Brazil
- Escudo – Chile
- Inti – Peru
- Peso
  - Bolivian peso
  - Costa Rican peso
  - Dominican peso
  - Guatemalan peso
  - Honduran peso
  - Nicaraguan peso
  - Paraguayan peso
- Scudo – Bolivia
- Sucre – Ecuador

==== Canada and the United States ====
- 5-sol French coin and silver coins – New France
- Spanish-American coins- unofficial
- Playing cards – 1685-1760s, sometimes officially New France
- 15 and a 30-deniers coin known as the mousquetaire – early 17th century New France
- Gold Louis – 1720 New France
- Sol and Double Sol 1738–1764
- English coins early 19th century
- Tokens and Army Bills – War of 1812
- British Shinplaster 1870s
- United States silver coins 1868–1869
- Vermont copper 1785-1791

==== Caribbean ====
- Dollar
  - Dominican dollar
  - Grenadian dollar
- Pound
  - Bahamian pound
  - Bermudian pound
  - Jamaican pound
- Netherlands Antillean guilder

==== Mexico ====
- Mexican dollar
- Mexican real
- Original Mexican peso – replaced by the nuevo peso (MXN), now just called peso, in 1993

== Asia ==
=== China ===
- Un chau – China
- Knife money – Zhou dynasty
- Ant nose coin – Chu (state)
- Ying Yuan – Chu (state)
- Sycee – Qin dynasty
- Ban Liang – Qin dynasty
- Spade money – Zhou dynasty, Xin dynasty
- Jiaozi (currency) – Song dynasty
- Guanzi (currency) – Song dynasty
- Huizi (currency) – Southern Song dynasty
- Cash – China
- Customs gold unit – China

=== India ===
- Hon and Shivrai of the Maratha dynasty
- Portuguese Indian rupia
- Portuguese Indian escudo
- French Indian rupee
- Travancore Rupee
- Rupee
  - Hyderabadi rupee
- Vijayanagara coinage

=== Indonesia ===
- Sumatran dollar
- Javan rupee
- Oeang Republik Indonesia (ORI)

=== Iran ===
- Qiran – Iran
- Achaemenid currency – Iran
- Elymais – Iran

=== Israel ===
- Palestine pound – Mandate for Palestine
- Israeli pound (or Lira) – Israel
- Old Israeli Shekel – Israel

=== Japan ===
- Ryō
- Mon
- Japanese cash
- Gold plates
  - Ōban
  - Koban
  - Ichibuban
- Yen
  - Military yen
  - Invasion money
  - B yen

=== Korean ===
- Hwan – Korea
- Mun
- Yang
- Imperial Won
- yen – Korea

=== Malaya ===
- Tin Animal Money
- Tin ingot
- Sumatran dudu
- Brunei pitis
- British North Borneo dollar
- Malayan dollar
- Malaya and British Borneo dollar – Malaya, Singapore, Sarawak, British North Borneo and Brunei
- Sarawak dollar
- Straits dollar – Straits Settlements

=== Philippines ===
- Gold Coinages
  - Piloncitos
  - Barter rings
- Silver Coinage
  - Hilis Kalamay (Silver cobs) -Philippines
  - Sampaloc Barillas
  - Dos Mundos
- Sulu coins- Philippines
- Piso
  - Philippine peso fuerte
  - Guerilla pesos

=== Taiwan ===
- Yen – Taiwan
- Old Taiwan dollar

=== Tibet ===
- Tibetan skar
- Tibetan srang
- Tibetan tangka

=== Vietnam ===
- Đồng – Vietnam
- Xu – South Vietnam
- lượng
- văn

=== Other currencies ===
- Keping
  - Kelantan keping
  - Trengganu keping
- Dollar
  - Mongolian dollar
- Baht – Thailand
- Escudo
  - Portuguese Timorese escudo
- Kushan Coinage
- Mohar – Nepal
- Pound
  - Jordanian pound
  - Palestine pound
- Rouble – Tajikistan
  - Bhutanese rupee
  - Burmese rupee
  - Gulf rupee – Bahrain, Kuwait, Oman, Qatar and United Arab Emirates

== Oceania ==
- Pound
  - Australian pound
  - Fijian pound
  - New Zealand pound
  - Solomon Islands pound
  - Tongan pound
  - Western Samoan pound
- Rai stones – Yap

== Europe ==
=== Currencies replaced by the euro ===
- European Currency Unit and 24 national currencies which were replaced by the euro:
  - Austrian schilling
  - Belgian franc
  - Bulgarian lev
  - Croatian kuna
  - Cypriot pound
  - Dutch guilder
  - Estonian kroon
  - Finnish markka
  - French franc
  - German mark
  - Greek drachma
  - Irish pound
  - Italian lira
  - Latvian lats
  - Lithuanian litas
  - Luxembourgish franc
  - Maltese lira
  - Monégasque franc
  - Portuguese escudo
  - Sammarinese lira
  - Slovak koruna
  - Slovenian tolar
  - Spanish peseta
  - Vatican lira

=== Other historical currencies ===
- Akçe
- Daler
  - Rigsdaler – Denmark and Norway
  - Rijksdaalder – Netherlands
  - Riksdaler – Sweden
  - Speciedaler – Norway
- Dinar
  - Bosnia and Herzegovina dinar
  - Croatian dinar
  - Serbian dinar
  - Yugoslav dinar – former Yugoslavia
- Double - Bailiwick of Guernsey
- Ducat – throughout Europe
- Écu
- Florin
  - Florin – Austria
  - Florin – Aragon
  - Florin – England
  - Florin – Great Britain
  - Double Florin – Great Britain
  - Florin – Italy and Italian city-states
- Farthing – Great Britain (Farthing (British coin)) and Ireland (Farthing (Irish coin))
  - Farthing (British coin)
  - Farthing (Irish coin)
- Genovino – Republic of Genoa
- Gold coin
- Groat – Great Britain
- Grzywna/Hryvnia
  - Grzywna – throughout Eastern Europe
  - Hryvnia – Ukraine
- Gulden – Germany and Austria
- Half crown – Great Britain
- Halfpenny
  - Halfpenny (Australian coin) – Australia
  - Halfpenny (British pre-decimal coin) – Great Britain
  - Halfpenny (Irish pre-decimal coin) – Ireland
  - Halfpenny (Irish decimal coin) – Ireland
  - Halfpenny (New Zealand) – New Zealand
  - Halfpenny (Scotland) – Scotland
- Ilgasis – Kingdom of Lithuania
- Koruna
  - Czechoslovak koruna
  - Bohemian and Moravian koruna
  - Slovak koruna (1939–1945)
- Leu
  - Romanian leu
  - Moldovan leu
- Libra jaquesa
- Lira
  - Neapolitan lira
  - Turkish lira
  - Venetian lira
- Livre
  - French livre
  - Luxembourgian livre
- Karbovanets – Ukraine
- Korona – Hungary
- Mark
  - East German mark – German Democratic Republic
  - Estonian mark
  - Goldmark – German Reich
  - Ostmark – German occupied eastern Europe
  - Papiermark – German Reich
  - Reichsmark – German Reich
  - Rentenmark – German Reich
  - Mark – Poland
- Pengő – Hungary
- Perper
  - Ragusian (Dubrovnik) perpera
  - Serbian perper
  - Montenegrin perper
- Perun
- Qirsh
- Shilling – Great Britain and others
- Sixpence – Great Britain and Ireland
- Peso – Spain
- Potin
- Real
  - Spanish real (plural reales)
  - Portuguese real (plural réis)
  - Gibraltar real
- Rouble – former Soviet Union
- Rublis – Latvia
- Scudo
  - Italian scudo – Lombardy-Venetia, Modena and Papal States
  - Maltese scudo
- Silver coin
- Spesmilo
- Stater
- Talonas – Lithuania
- Thaler – Germany, Austria, Hungary
  - Conventionsthaler
  - Reichsthaler
  - Vereinsthaler
- Threepence – Great Britain
  - Threepence (Australian)
  - Threepence (British coin)
  - Threepence (Irish coin)
- Złoty
  - Polish złoty (Poland)

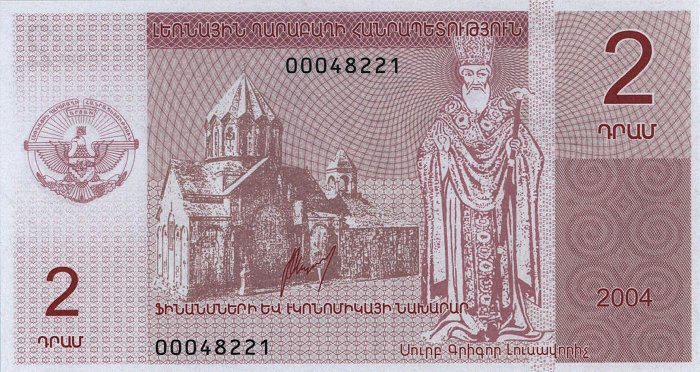
The formerly used Artsakh dram, was not used in day-to-day commerce, but was legal tender in their issuing jurisdiction.

=== South Caucasus ===
- Abazi – Georgia
- Artsakh dram – Artsakh
- Rouble
  - Armenian rouble
  - Azerbaijani rouble
  - Georgian rouble
  - Transcaucasian rouble

== International ==
- Stelo, 1945–1993 monetary unit used by Esperantists.

== See also ==
- List of circulating currencies
