= Cainta (historical polity) =

Historical polity in present-day Philippines

Cainta ᜃᜁᜈ᜔ᜆ (Baybayin)
- unknown–1571
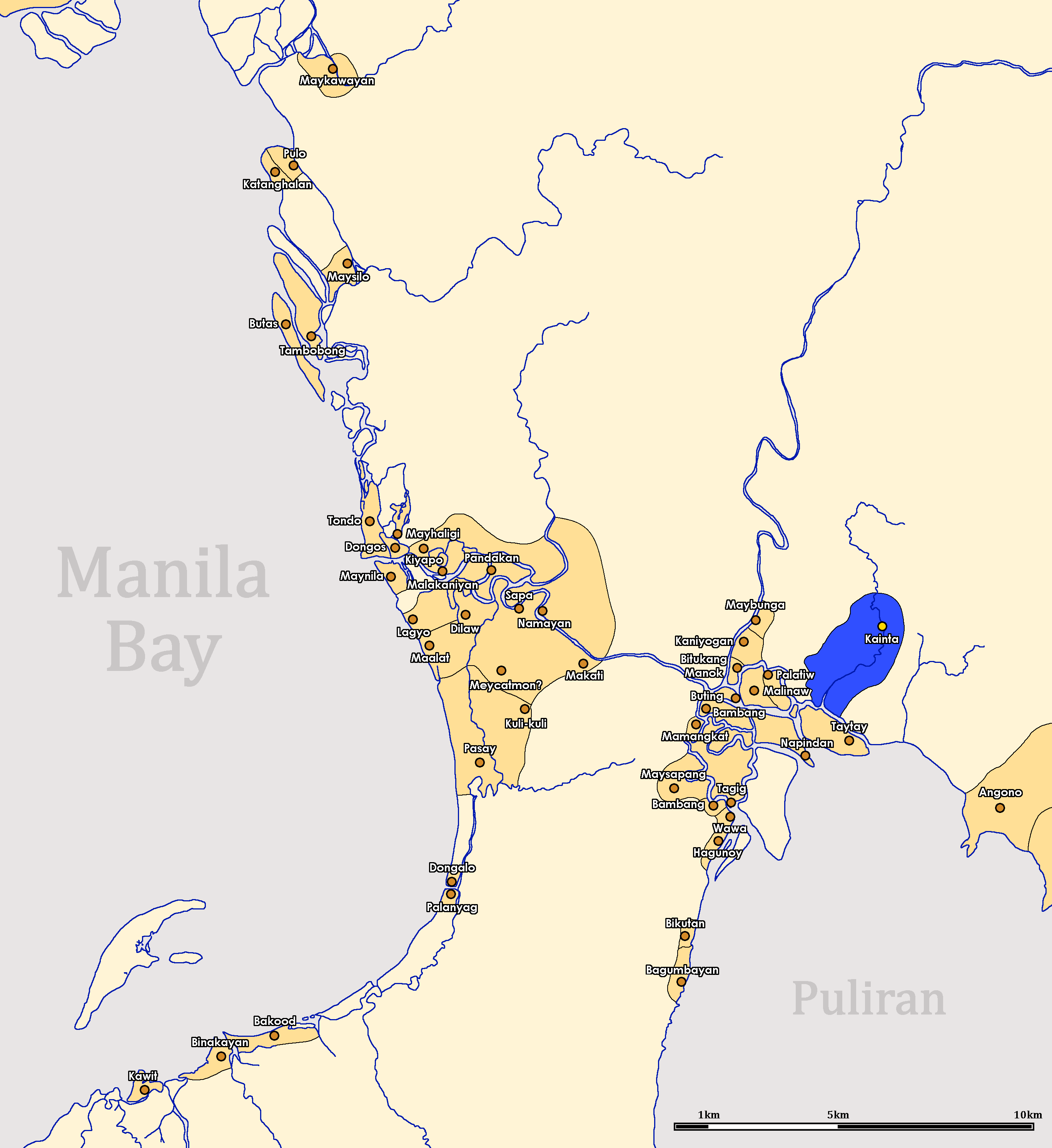
- Location of Cainta (colored blue) in 1570.
- Status: Precolonial barangay
- Common languages: Old Tagalog, Old Malay
- Government: Feudal pre-colonial bayan
- History
  - Established: unknown
  - Conquest by Spain: 1571
- Currency: Piloncitos, barter rings, barter
Succeeded by
Captaincy General of the Philippines; Manila (province)
- Today part of: Philippines

In early Philippine history, the Tagalog bayan of Cainta was a fortified upriver polity that occupied both shores of an arm of the Pasig River. It was located not far from where the Pasig River meets the Lake of Ba-i and is presumed to be the present site of the municipality of Cainta, Rizal.

== Description ==
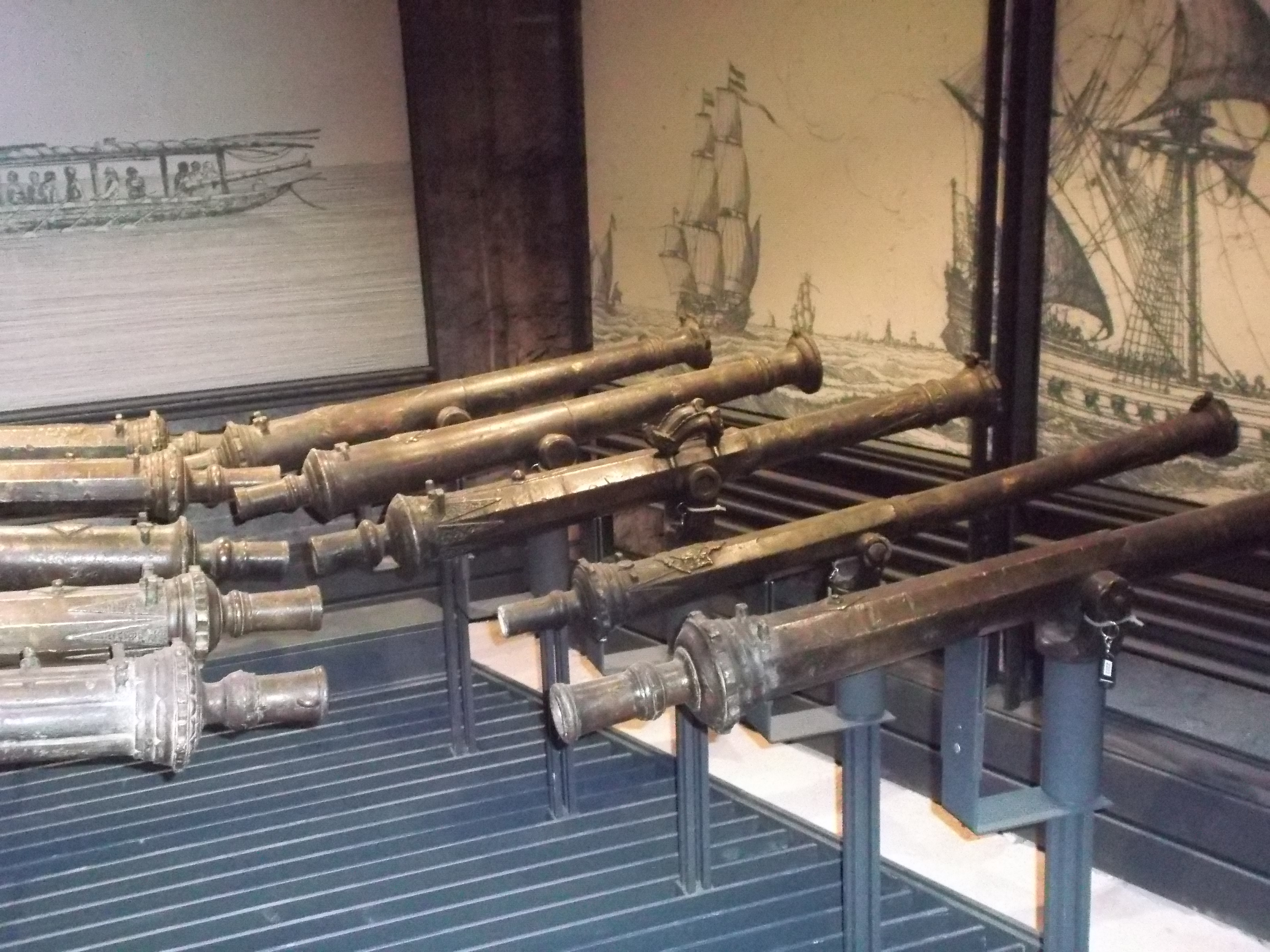
A collection of Philippine lantaka, the swivel guns or mounted cannons used for war in the precolonial polity of Cainta

Descriptions of early chroniclers say that the polity was surrounded by bamboo thickets, defended by a log wall, stone bulwarks, and several lantakas, and that an arm of the Pasig River flowed through the middle of the city, dividing it into two settlements.

As described in an anonymous 1572 account documented in Volume 3 of Blair and Robertson's compiled translations:

This said village had about a thousand inhabitants, and was surrounded by very tall and very dense bamboo thickets, and fortified with a wall and a few small culverins. The same river as that of Manila circles around the village and a branch of it passes through the middle dividing it in two sections.

== History ==
=== Siege of Cainta ===
When the Spanish forces of Miguel López de Legazpi first established the city of Manila in 1571, Cainta was one of the surrounding polities that went to Manila to negotiate for friendship with Manila. However, Cainta's envoys noted the small size of Legazpi's forces and decided to withdraw their offer of friendship since Cainta was a fortified polity that was perfectly capable of defending itself.

In August 1571, Legazpi assigned his nephew, Juan de Salcedo, to "pacify" Cainta. After traveling several days upriver, Salcedo laid siege to the city and eventually found a weak spot on the wall. In the final Spanish attack, over 400 residents of Cainta were killed.

=== Dissolution ===
Cainta was established as a visita (annex) of Taytay on November 30, 1571, under the administration of the Jesuits.

== See also ==
- Tondo (historical polity)
- Maynila (historical polity)
- Namayan
