= Community Tax Certificate =

Philippine identity document

- Type: Identity document
- Issued by: Philippines

A community tax certificate (Filipino: sertípiko ng buwís pampámayanan) or sédula (from Spanish cédula), sometimes confused as residence certificate, is a legal identity document in the Philippines. Issued by cities and municipalities to all persons that have reached the age of majority and upon payment of a community tax, it is considered a primary form of identification in the Philippines alongside the driver's license and the passport, and is one of the closest, single documents the country has to a national system of identification. The Community Tax Certificate does not act as a residence certificate which is instead covered by the Barangay Certification/Barangay Clearance.

The Philippine national government's current power to levy community taxes and issue accompanying certificates through local government units is by virtue of Article 6 of the 1991 Local Government Code.

== History ==
The history of the community tax certificate entails three incarnations dating back to Spanish colonial times. Introduced in a 19th-century reform of the tax system which followed the Revolt Against the Tribute of 1589 which scrapped the system of tribute, as well as subsequent tax reforms, the cédula was issued to all indios or natives between the ages of 18 and 60 upon payment of a residence tax of eight reales or its equivalent in goods, and was paid annually. This tax was later increased to fifteen reales. When the peso fuerte was introduced in 1854, the residence tax became one peso fuerte and seven reales.

The Residence Certificate is commonly mistaken for Community Tax Certificate, when it is the form more commonly known as a Barangay Clearance.

The cédula would play an important role in the Philippine Revolution, when Andrés Bonifacio and fellow members of the Katipunan tore up their cédulas in defiance of Spanish rule during a meeting in Balintawak (present-day Quezon City). This would be known as the Cry of Pugadlawin and ignited the beginning of the Philippine Revolution.

The residence tax, and in turn, the cédula, were abolished by occupying American forces. No such tax would be imposed again until January 1, 1940, when Commonwealth Act No. 465 went into effect, mandating the imposition of a base residence tax of fifty centavos and an additional tax of one peso based on factors such as income and real estate holdings. Payment of this tax would merit the issue of a residence certificate, while persons ineligible for paying may be issued a certificate for twenty centavos. Corporations were also subject to the residence tax.

Commonwealth Act No. 465 mandated that the High Commissioner and his staff, members and employees of the United States Armed Forces, visitors and consular staff were exempt from paying the residence tax, and as such are not given a residence certificate.

Following Philippine independence from the United States in July 1946, the same provisions were kept in effect. However, the changing socio-political climate necessitated the reform of certain provisions of Commonwealth Act No. 465. Significant amendments to the residence tax law were put into effect first in 1973, following the enactment of the Local Tax Code, with amendments on the allocation of the residence tax and on who are covered under it, as well as payment provisions. The same provisions from the Local Tax Code were later subsumed into the Local Government Code of 1991. However, following the closure of U.S. bases in the Philippines, community tax exemptions on United States military personnel were likewise abolished. The residence tax and residence certificate were subsequently renamed as the current community tax and community tax certificate.

== Features ==
A community tax certificate contains the following information:

- Full name
- Height (in centimetres)
- Weight (in kilograms)
- Tax identification number or TIN
- Place and date of birth
- Nationality
- Civil status
- Occupation or calling
- Right-hand thumbprint
- Signatures of the bearer and issuing officer

== Uses ==
When used as a primary form of identification, community tax certificates are used when someone acknowledges a document before a notary public, takes an oath of office or is appointed to a government position, receives a license or permit from a government authority, pays government taxes or fees, receives money from a public fund, transacts official business (such as business registration) or receives salaries and wages.

In certain instances, community tax certificates are used as a secondary form of identification, rather than a primary one. Instances where this is the case include applying for a passport.

In other cases, such as voter registration and opening bank accounts, community tax certificates are not a valid form of identification.

== Disposition of proceeds ==
During Spanish times, the fifteen-real residence tax was split between the national and local governments and the Roman Catholic Church. Ten reales proceeded to the national treasury, three reales to the Church and one real each to the local treasury and the diezmo predial (tithe).

In the American period, the residence tax was split between the provincial and local government. One-fourth of all residence tax proceeds went to the general funds of the provinces, one-fourth to the general funds of the cities, municipalities, and municipal districts and two-fourths to the school fund of the cities, municipalities, and municipal districts.

Currently, under the Local Government Code of the Philippines, revenues accrued from levying the community tax are split between city/municipal and barangay governments, with a small portion allotted to the national government to offset the cost of printing the community tax certificates. Community taxes collected by city or municipal governments proceed immediately to the city or municipal treasury, while taxes collected by barangay treasurers are allotted on a half-by-half basis, with fifty percent of the revenues allotted to the city or municipal treasury and the remaining fifty percent to the barangay treasury.

== See also ==
- Cédula de identidad
