= Barter rings =

Ancient Filipino currency

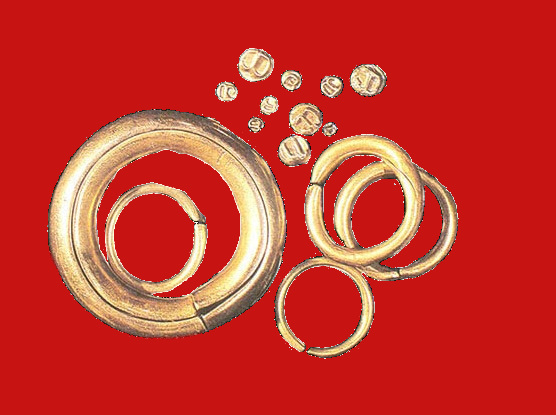
Barter rings along with piloncitos.

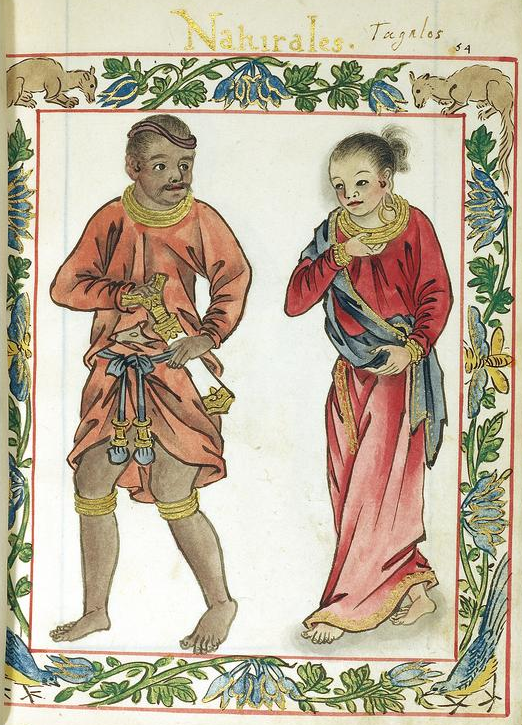
Tagalog royal couple with various gold ornaments including the gold rings.

Barter rings (Tagalog: panika) are ring-shaped gold ingots used as currency in the Philippines until the 16th century. These barter rings are bigger than a doughnut in size and are made of nearly pure gold.

== Description ==
The early Filipinos traded piloncitos along with barter rings.

Barter rings varies in thickness with a dual purpose: round hollow circlets of gold used as earrings or anklets by kadatuan and high-ranking nobility, aside for money. They are also very similar to the first coins invented in the Kingdom of Lydia in present-day Turkey. Barter rings were circulated in the Philippines up to the 16th century. As the discovery of gold deposits were seen by the locals, the precious metal was mined and worked in the Philippines, evidenced by many Spanish accounts like one in 1586 that stated:

“The people of this island (Luzon) are very skillful in their handling of gold. They weigh it with the greatest skill and delicacy that have ever been seen. The first thing they teach their children is the knowledge of gold and the weights with which they weigh it, for there is no other money among them.”

== See also ==
- Piloncitos and Siamese photduang
- History of Philippine money
- Philippine peso, the currency of the modern Philippines.
- Philippine real
- List of historical currencies

Preceded by No modern currencies (Barter rings or Sigay)	Philippine currency c.10th −16th century	Succeeded by Philippine real
