= Dollar =

Name of monetary currency

Countries that use the US dollar Countries or territories that use a non-US currency named dollar Countries that formerly used a dollar currency

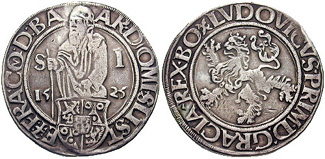
The Joachimsthaler of the Kingdom of Bohemia was the first thaler (dollar).

Dollar is the name of more than 25 currencies and their base units. The United States dollar, named after the international currency known as the Spanish dollar, was established in 1792 and is the first so named that still survives. Others include the Australian dollar, Brunei dollar, Canadian dollar, Eastern Caribbean dollar, Hong Kong dollar, Jamaican dollar, Liberian dollar, Namibian dollar, New Taiwan dollar, New Zealand dollar, Singapore dollar, Trinidad and Tobago dollar, and several others. The symbol for most of those currencies is the dollar sign $; the same symbol is used by many countries using peso currencies.

The name 'dollar' originates from the thaler, which was the name of a 29-gram (1.0 oz) silver coin called the Joachimsthaler minted in 1519 in the western part of Bohemia (now the Czech Republic). The word thaler itself comes from the German word Thal, i.e. 'valley'.

== Economies that use a "dollar" ==
Country or territory	ISO 4217 code	Currency	Established	Preceding currency
Antigua and Barbuda	XCD	Eastern Caribbean dollar	1965	British West Indies dollar
Australia and its territories	AUD	Australian dollar	1966	Australian pound 1910–1966; Pound sterling 1825–1910
Bahamas	BSD	Bahamian dollar	1966	Bahamian pound
Barbados	BBD	Barbadian dollar	1972	Eastern Caribbean dollar
Belize	BZD	Belize dollar	1973	British Honduran dollar
Bermuda	BMD	Bermudian dollar	1970	Pound sterling
Brunei	BND (SGD)	Brunei dollar (Alongside the Singapore dollar)	1967	Malaya and British Borneo dollar
Canada	CAD	Canadian dollar	1858	Spanish dollar pre-1841 Canadian pound 1841–1858; Newfoundland dollar 1865–1949 in the Dominion of Newfoundland
Cayman Islands	KYD	Cayman Islands dollar	1972	Jamaican dollar
Dominica	XCD	Eastern Caribbean dollar	1965	British West Indies dollar
Fiji	FJD	Fijian dollar	1969	Fijian pound
Grenada	XCD	Eastern Caribbean dollar	1965	British West Indies dollar
Guyana	GYD	Guyanese dollar	1839	Eastern Caribbean dollar
Hong Kong	HKD	Hong Kong dollar	1863	Rupee, Real (Spanish/Colonial Spain: Mexican), Chinese cash
Jamaica	JMD	Jamaican dollar	1969	Jamaican pound
Kiribati	KID / AUD	Kiribati dollar along with the Australian dollar	1979	Australian dollar
Liberia	LRD	Liberian dollar	1937	United States dollar
Namibia	NAD/ZAR	Namibian dollar along with the South African rand	1993	South African rand
Nauru	AUD	Australian dollar		
New Zealand and its territories and dependencies	NZD	New Zealand dollar	1967	New Zealand pound
Saint Kitts and Nevis	XCD	Eastern Caribbean dollar	1965	
Saint Lucia	XCD	Eastern Caribbean dollar	1965	
Saint Vincent and the Grenadines	XCD	Eastern Caribbean dollar	1965	
Singapore	SGD (BND)	Singapore dollar (Alongside the Brunei dollar)	1967	Malaya and British Borneo dollar
Solomon Islands	SBD	Solomon Islands dollar	1977	Australian pound
Suriname	SRD	Surinamese dollar	2004	Surinamese guilder
Taiwan	TWD	New Taiwan dollar	1949	Old Taiwan dollar
Trinidad and Tobago	TTD	Trinidad and Tobago dollar	1964	British West Indies dollar
Tuvalu	TVD / AUD	Tuvaluan dollar along with the Australian dollar	1976	
United States and its territories	USD	United States dollar	1792	Spanish dollar Colonial scrip

=== Other countries that use the United States dollar ===
Country or territory	Established	Preceding currency
East Timor	2002	Indonesian rupiah
Ecuador	2001	Ecuadorian sucre
El Salvador	2001	Salvadoran colón
Marshall Islands		
Federated States of Micronesia		
Palau		

=== Other territories that use a dollar ===
Territory	Currency
Anguilla	Eastern Caribbean dollar
Bonaire (Netherlands)	US dollar
British Indian Ocean Territory	US dollar (alongside the pound sterling)
British Virgin Islands	US dollar
Montserrat	Eastern Caribbean dollar
Saba (Netherlands)	US dollar
Saint Pierre and Miquelon (France)	Canadian dollar (alongside the euro)
Sint Eustatius (Netherlands)	US dollar
Turks and Caicos Islands	US dollar

=== Countries unofficially accepting "dollars" ===
Country	Currency
Afghanistan	US dollar
Argentina	US dollar
Bolivia	US dollar
Cambodia	US dollar
Cuba	US dollar
Guatemala	US dollar
Laos	US dollar
Lebanon
Macau	Hong Kong dollar
Maldives	US dollar
Myanmar	US dollar
Nicaragua	US dollar
North Korea	US dollar
Panama	US dollar
Paraguay	US dollar
Peru	US dollar
Philippines	US dollar
Uruguay	US dollar
Venezuela
Vietnam

== Countries and regions that have previously used a "dollar" currency ==
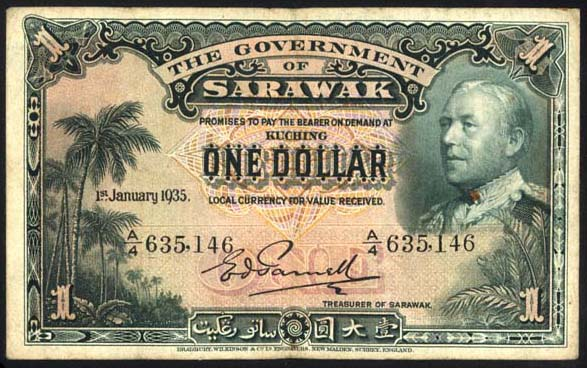
One Sarawak dollar from 1935, featuring Charles Vyner Brooke, the 3rd and last White Rajah of Sarawak

Country	Introduction	Withdrawal	Notes
Confederate States of America	1861	1865	The Confederate States dollar issued from March 1861 to 1865.
Ethiopia	1945	1976	The name Ethiopian dollar was used in the English text on the banknotes. It was divided into 100 santims (derived from the French centime). Birr became the official name, used in all languages, in 1976.
Malaysia	1967	1975	On 12 June 1967, the Malaysian dollar, issued by the new central bank, Central Bank of Malaysia, replaced the Malaya and British Borneo dollar. The Malaysian Ringgit name was introduced in 1975.
Sierra Leone	1791	1805	The Sierra Leonean dollar was used from 1791 to 1805. It was subdivided into 100 cents and was issued by the Sierra Leone Company. The dollar was pegged to sterling at a rate of 1 dollar = 4 shillings 2 pence.
Spain	1497	1868	The Spanish dollar was used from 1497 to 1868.
Sri Lanka	1815	1828	The Ceylonese rixdollar was a currency used in British Ceylon in the early 19th Century.
Rhodesia	1970	1980	the Rhodesian dollar replaced the Rhodesian pound in 1970 and it was used until Zimbabwe came into being in 1980.
Republic of Texas	1839	1840	The Texas dollar was issued between January 1839 and September 1840.
Zimbabwe	1980	2009	The Zimbabwean dollar was the name of four official currencies of Zimbabwe from 1980 to 12 April 2009. During this time, it was subject to periods of extreme inflation, followed by a period of hyperinflation. Another Zimbabwean dollar was in use from 2019 to 2024.
Zimbabwe	2019	2024	The Zimbabwean dollar was the name of four official currencies of Zimbabwe from 1980 to 12 April 2009. During this time, it was subject to periods of extreme inflation, followed by a period of hyperinflation. Another Zimbabwean dollar was in use from 2019 to 2024.

== History ==
=== Etymology ===
On 15 January 1520, the Kingdom of Bohemia began minting coins from silver mined locally in Joachimsthal and marked on reverse with the Bohemian lion. The coins were named Joachimsthaler after the town, becoming shortened in common usage to thaler or taler. The town's name is derived from Saint Joachim, coupled with the German word Thal (Tal in modern spelling), which means 'valley' (cf. the English term dale); the coin is thus "from the valley of [St] Joachim".

This name found its way into other languages, for example:

- German — Thaler (or Taler)
- Czech, Slovak and Slovene — tolar
- Slovak — toliar
- Croatian — talir
- Polish — talar
- Low German — daler
- Dutch — rijksdaalder (or daler)
- Danish and Norwegian — rigsdaler
- Latvian — dālderis
- Swedish — riksdaler
- Spanish — dólar (or real de a ocho or peso duro)
- Hungarian — tallér
- Ethiopian — talari (ታላሪ)
- English — dollar

In contrast to other languages which adopted the second part of word joachimsthaler, the first part found its way into Russian language and became efimok, yefimok (ефимок).

The predecessor of the Joachimsthaler was the Guldengroschen or Guldiner which was a large silver coin originally minted in Tirol in 1486 and introduced into the Duchy of Saxony in 1500. The King of Bohemia wanted a similar silver coin, which became the Joachimsthaler.

=== Europe and colonial North America ===
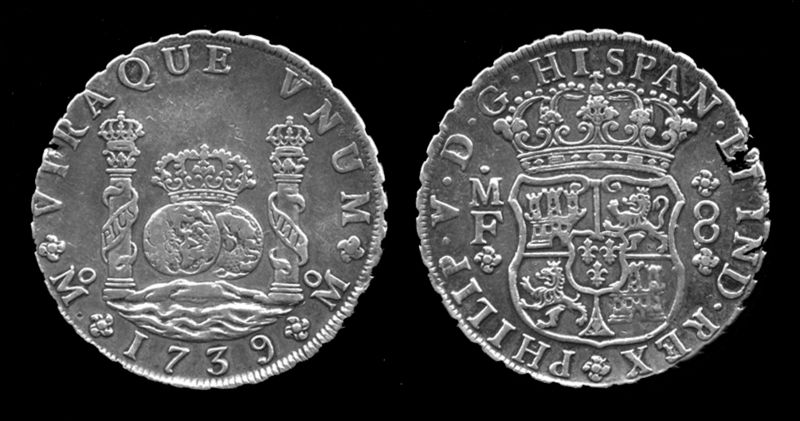
The Spanish dollar, natively called Peso, was the main coin of the Spanish Empire. This coin is from 1739.

The Joachimsthaler of the 16th century was succeeded by the longer-lived Reichsthaler of the Holy Roman Empire, used from the 16th to 19th centuries. The Netherlands also introduced its own dollars in the 16th century: the Burgundian Cross Thaler (Bourgondische Kruisdaalder), the German-inspired Rijksdaalder, and the Dutch lion dollar (leeuwendaalder). The latter coin was used for Dutch trade in the Middle East, in the Dutch East Indies and West Indies, and in the Thirteen Colonies of North America.

For the English North American colonists, however, the Spanish peso or "piece of eight" had always held first place, and this coin was also called the "dollar" as early as 1581. Spanish dollars or "pieces of eight" were distributed widely in the Spanish colonies in the New World and in the Philippines.

=== Origins of the dollar sign ===
The sign is first attested in business correspondence in the 1770s as a scribal abbreviation "p^{s}", referring to the Spanish American peso, that is, the "Spanish dollar" as it was known in British North America. These late 18th- and early 19th-century manuscripts show that the s gradually came to be written over the p developing a close equivalent to the "$" mark, and this new symbol was retained to refer to the American dollar as well, once this currency was adopted in 1785 by the United States.

=== Adoption by the United States ===
By the time of the American Revolution, the Spanish dólar gained significance because they backed paper money authorized by the individual colonies and the Continental Congress. Because Britain deliberately withheld hard currency from the American colonies, virtually all the non-token coinage in circulation was Spanish (and to a much lesser extent French and Dutch) silver, obtained via illegal but widespread commerce with the West Indies. Common in the Thirteen Colonies, Spanish dólar were even legal tender in one colony, Virginia.

On 2 April 1792, U.S. Secretary of the Treasury Alexander Hamilton reported to Congress the precise amount of silver found in Spanish dollar coins in common use in the states. As a result, the United States dollar was defined as a unit of pure silver weighing 371 4/16th grains (24.057 grams), or 416 grains of standard silver (standard silver being defined as 371.25/416 in silver, and balance in alloy). It was specified that the "money of account" of the United States should be expressed in those same "dollars" or parts thereof. Additionally, all lesser-denomination coins were defined as percentages of the dollar coin, such that a half-dollar was to contain half as much silver as a dollar, quarter-dollars would contain one-fourth as much, and so on.

In an act passed in January 1837, the dollar's weight was reduced to 412.5 grains and alloy at 90% silver, resulting in the same fine silver content of 371.25 grains. On 21 February 1853, the quantity of silver in the lesser coins was reduced, with the effect that their denominations no longer represented their silver content relative to dollar coins.

Various acts have subsequently been passed affecting the amount and type of metal in U.S. coins, so that today there is no legal definition of the term "dollar" to be found in U.S. statute. Currently the closest thing to a definition is found in United States Code Title 31, Section 5116, paragraph b, subsection 2: "The Secretary [of the Treasury] shall sell silver under conditions the Secretary considers appropriate for at least $1.292929292 a fine troy ounce."

Silver was mostly removed from U.S. coinage by 1965 and the dollar became a free-floating fiat money without a commodity backing defined in terms of real gold or silver. The United States Mint continues to make silver $1-denomination coins, but these are not intended for general circulation.

== Usage in the United Kingdom ==
There are two quotes in the plays of William Shakespeare referring to dollars as money. Coins known as "thistle dollars" were in use in Scotland during the 16th and 17th centuries, and use of the English word, and perhaps even the use of the coin, may have begun at the University of St Andrews. This might be supported by a reference to the sum of "ten thousand dollars" in Macbeth (act I, scene II) (an anachronism because the real Macbeth, upon whom the play was based, lived in the 11th century). In the Sherlock Holmes story "The Man with the Twisted Lip" by Sir Arthur Conan Doyle, published in 1891, an Englishman posing as a London beggar describes the shillings and pounds he collected as dollars:

It was a long light between my pride and the money, but the dollars won at last, and I threw up reporting, and sat day after day in the corner which I had first chosen, inspiring pity by my ghastly face, and filling my pockets with coppers.

In 1804, a British five-shilling piece, or crown, was sometimes called "dollar". It was an overstruck Spanish eight real coin (the famous "piece of eight"), the original of which was known as a Spanish dollar. Large numbers of these eight-real coins were captured during the Napoleonic Wars, hence their re-use by the Bank of England. They remained in use until 1811. During World War II, when the U.S. dollar was (approximately) valued at five shillings, the half crown (2s 6d) acquired the nickname "half dollar" or "half a dollar" in the UK.

== Usage elsewhere ==
Chinese demand for silver in the 19th and early 20th centuries led several countries, notably the United Kingdom, United States and Japan, to mint trade dollars, which were often of slightly different weights from comparable domestic coinage. Silver dollars reaching China (whether Spanish, trade, or other) were often stamped with Chinese characters known as "chop marks", which indicated that that particular coin had been assayed by a well-known merchant and deemed genuine.

=== Other national currencies called "dollar" ===
A New Zealand one-dollar coin

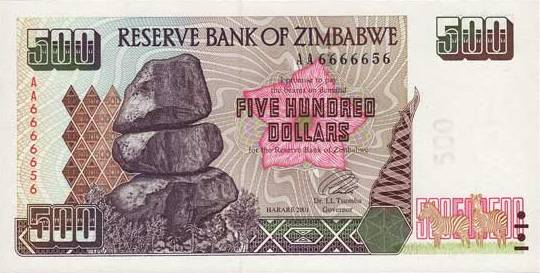
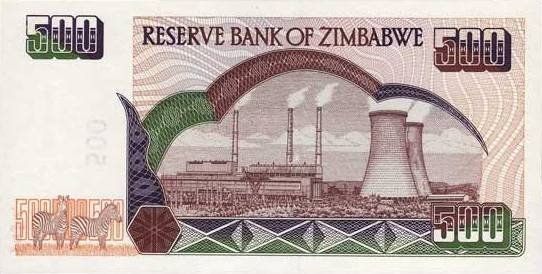
500 old Zimbabwean dollar bill of the first Zimbabwean dollar

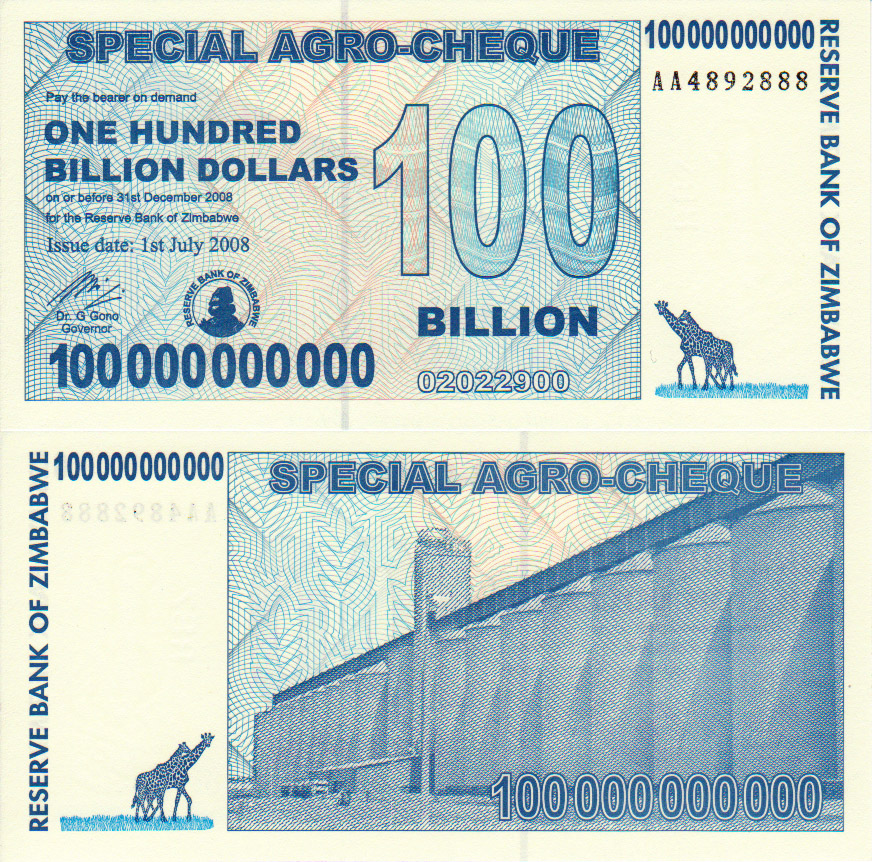
A special agro-cheque for 100 billion dollars, during the hyperinflation in Zimbabwe

Prior to 1873, the silver dollar circulated in many parts of the world, with a value in relation to the British gold sovereign of roughly $1 = 4s 2d (21p approx). As a result of the decision of the German Empire to stop minting silver thaler coins in 1871, in the wake of the Franco-Prussian War, the worldwide price of silver began to fall. This resulted in the U.S. Coinage Act (1873) which put the United States onto a 'de facto' gold standard. Canada and Newfoundland were already on the gold standard, and the result was that the value of the dollar in North America increased in relation to silver dollars being used elsewhere, particularly Latin America and the Far East. By 1900, value of silver dollars had fallen to 50 percent of gold dollars. Following the abandonment of the gold standard by Canada in 1931, the Canadian dollar began to drift away from parity with the U.S. dollar. It returned to parity a few times, but since the end of the Bretton Woods system of fixed exchange rates that was agreed to in 1944, the Canadian dollar has been floating against the U.S. dollar. The silver dollars of Latin America and South East Asia began to diverge from each other as well during the course of the 20th century. The Straits dollar adopted a gold exchange standard in 1906 after it had been forced to rise in value against other silver dollars in the region. Hence, by 1935, when China and Hong Kong came off the silver standard, the Straits dollar was worth 2s 4d (11.5p approx) sterling, whereas the Hong Kong dollar was worth only 1s 3d sterling (6p approx).

The term "dollar" has also been adopted by other countries for currencies which do not share a common history with other dollars. Many of these currencies adopted the name after moving from a £sd-based to a decimalized monetary system. Examples include the Australian dollar, the New Zealand dollar, the Jamaican dollar, the Cayman Islands dollar, the Fiji dollar, the Namibian dollar, the Rhodesian dollar, the Zimbabwe dollar, and the Solomon Islands dollar.

- The tala is based on the Samoan pronunciation of the word "dollar".
- The Slovenian tolar had the same etymological origin as dollar (that is, thaler).
- The Swedish Daler used to be the name for the currency and have the same etymological origin as the German thaler).

== See also ==
- Eurodollar
- List of circulating currencies
- North American currency union Amero
- Petrodollar
