= Early Nusantara coins =

Coins of early Indonesia

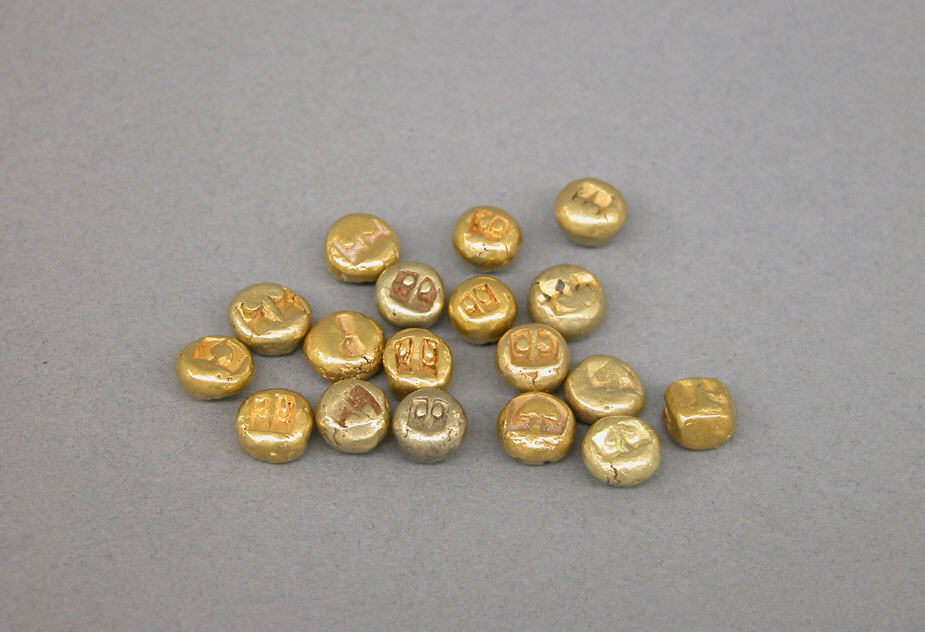
One masa gold coins: five millimeters diameter.

By the 10th-century, Java had one of the most complex economies in Southeast Asia. Despite the importance of rice farming which acts as the chief tax income for the Javanese courts, the influx of sea trade in Asia between the 10th and 13th centuries forced a more convenient currency to the Javanese economy. During the late 8th-century, ingots made of gold and silver were introduced. These are the early Nusantara coins.

== Early development in Central Java ==
In Java, rice farming was still the main occupation of most households in the village. This continued to provide most of the tax income of the Javanese courts. Later in the period, the northern coasts of Java and Bali became the main center of an affluent export trade in local agricultural products and manufacture, as well as spices e.g. sandalwood from eastern Indonesia. These trade brought goods to distant markets e.g. China and India. The increasing intensity of trade called for a convenient currency in the Javanese society.

During the late 8th-century money took the form of ingots made of gold and silver. These are the earliest recorded coins in Indonesia. The currency in Indonesia is based on weight; the most common units were the kati of 750 grams (26 oz), tahil of 38 grams (1.3 oz), masa 2.4 grams (0.085 oz) and kupang 0.6 grams (0.021 oz). These units were legal tender for tax payments. The kati, tahil, masa and kupang units remained in use up until the Dutch period. Several trade jargons were introduced in this period, e.g. the Javanese wli, which became the modern Indonesian beli ("buy"), and the Sanskrit wyaya, modern Indonesian term biaya ("expenses") appears in two inscriptions both dated 878 AD. The Javanese coins have no parallels with the style of Indian coins. Most of the Javanese coins were found within the Javanese kingdom of Shailendra.

=== Gold coins ===
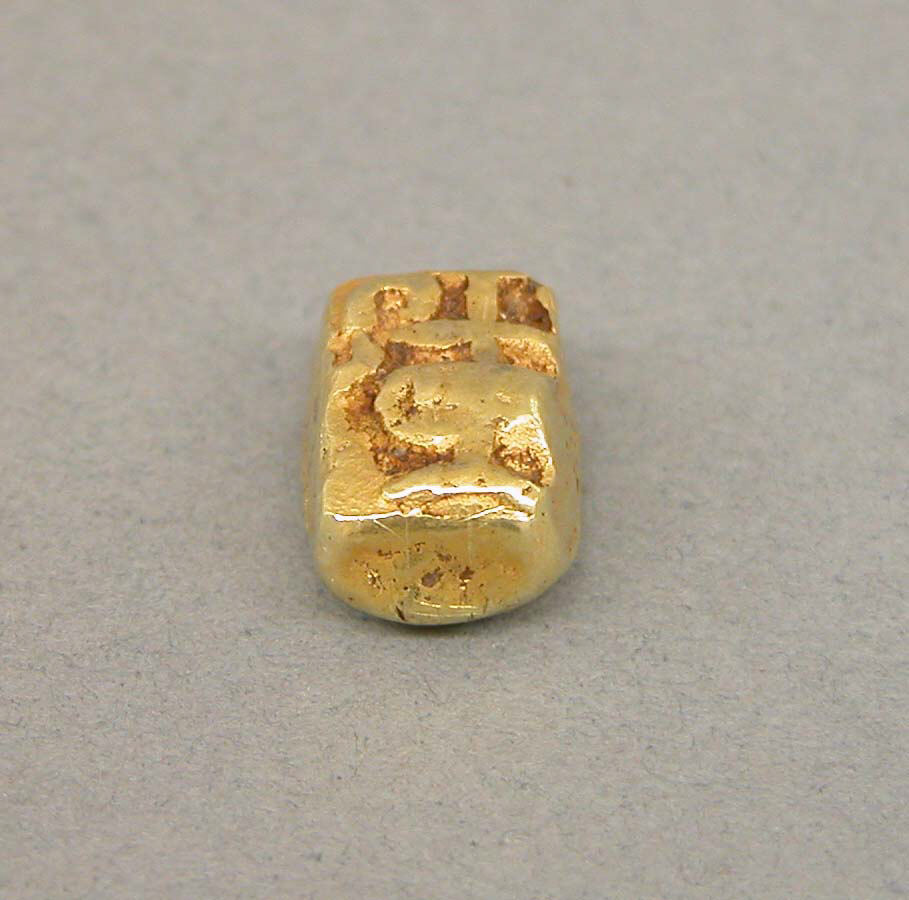
A gold coin of probably the highest denomination of ka.

Most gold coins of 9th and early 10th century Java are stamped with the character ta in nagari script on one side, an abbreviation of tahil. The same character remained on coins until the Kediri period in the 12th-century. Gold coins were usually made in the shape of cubes, carefully crafted and very uniform in size and gold content.

=== Silver coins ===
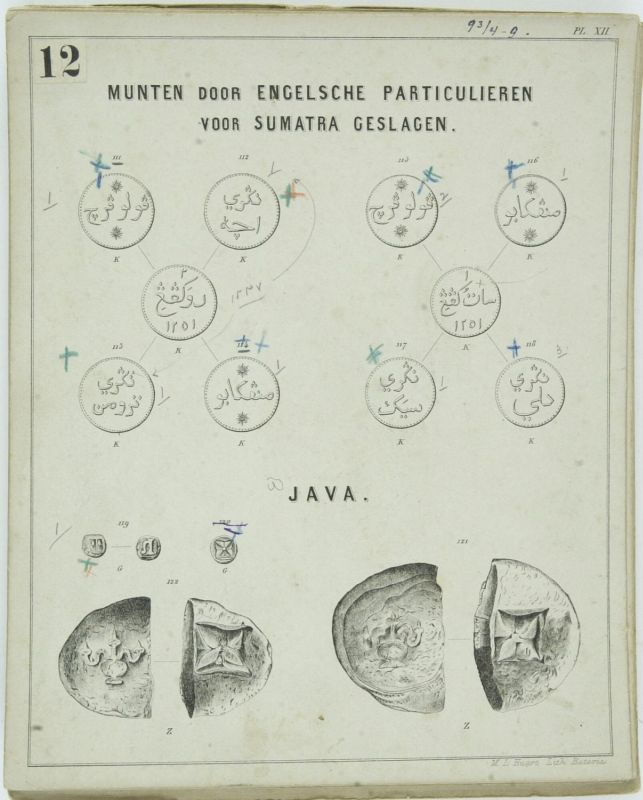
Sandalwood decoration or quatrefoil appeared in the silver ingot on the picture below.

Central Javanese silver coins have very different shapes compared with the gold coins. Most silver coins are round and known as "sandalwood flower" coins referring to the four-petaled flower (quatrefoil) found on the reverse. The silver coins lasted from the early 9th until the 14th century. The same flower appears on one side of older silver ingots from central Java; the other side is stamped with a flowing vase design, which is never found on coins. The obverse of the sandalwood flower coins are stamped with the nagari character ma (abbreviation of masa).

Unlike the gold coins, the silver coins changed rapidly. In only one century, the character ma degenerated very quickly, perhaps because it is different with the Javanese Kawi letter for ma. The shape also changed; in the early 10th-century, the shape of one masa changed from a thick and flat coin to a thin and cup-shaped coin. The silver coins were presumably served as small change. The silver coins were probably created by smiths in the market for use in market transactions.

In Java, beginning at the end of the 10th-century and onwards, more and more Chinese copper coins were imported in greater quantities, as well as Chinese cash and local copies, known as pisis. These coins began to displace the silver alloy coins as small denomination currency. By the mid-14th century, there were so many pisis in circulation, that the Javanese court recognized them as official currency for tax purposes.

== Sumatran coins ==
In Sumatra, coins were first minted in the 11th-century. Similar sandalwood flower coins like those in Java were discovered in Sumatra, but more of these were made of gold, electrum, and silver alloys. Several 11th-century sites in Sumatra including Barus, Bengkulu, and Muara Jambi were abundant in gold coins, while silver is rare. Similar coins were also found in South Thailand. The Sumatran silver alloy examples are very well made compared with the Javanese silver coins.

Curiously, no coins have been found at Palembang, said to be the center of the Sriwijayan economy. This suggests that coins may have had a limited role in the early Sriwijayan economy. International trades might have been conducted either through the mechanism known as tributary trade or in other form known as administered trade. In administered trade system, equivalencies were established between commodities through diplomatic negotiations rather than bargaining.

== Legacy ==
The gold piloncitos of the Philippines are a late offshoot of the Indonesian gold coinage, while the bean-like silver "namo" series of the Malay peninsula was presumably an offshoot of the silver and may have evolved into the bullet (pod duang) coinage of Sukhothai in Thailand.

== See also ==
- Coins of the rupiah
