= Philippine peso fuerte =

Former currency of the Philippines

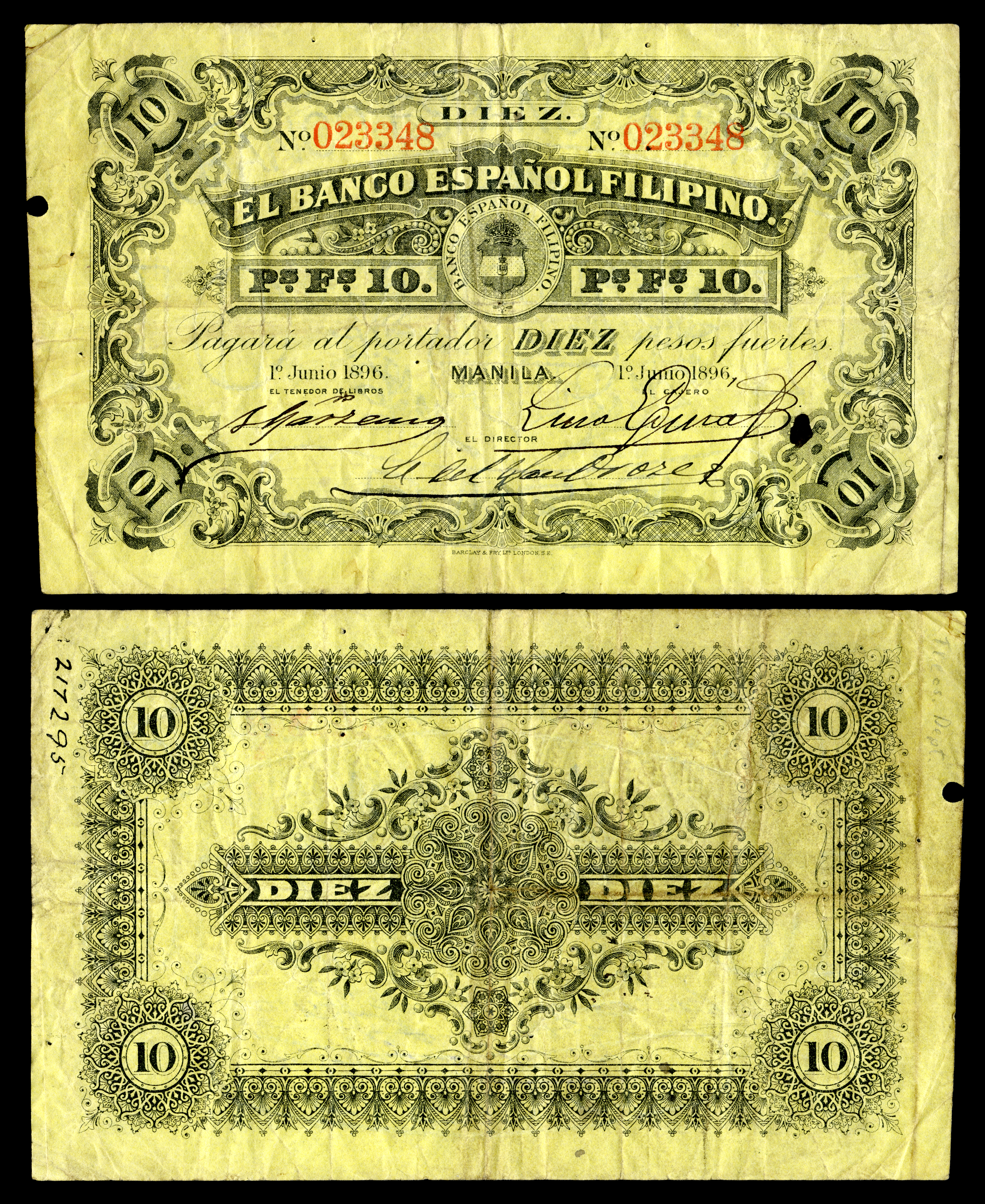
El Banco Español-Filipino, 10 pesos (1896)

The Philippine peso fuerte (Spanish "Strong Peso" sign: PF) was the first paper currency of the Philippines and the Spanish East Indies during the later Spanish colonial period. It co-circulated with other Spanish silver and gold coins and was issued by El Banco Español Filipino de Isabel II (currently Bank of the Philippine Islands). The banknotes were convertible to either silver pesos or gold coins at the bank's discretion. The colonial government at the time allowed El Banco Español-Filipino to issue pesos fuertes up to one-fourths of its subscribed capital, or a maximum of PF 100,000, which was subsequently raised to 300,000 in 1855.

El Banco Español-Filipino began issuing peso fuerte notes on May 1, 1852. As of the end of the 19th century its circulating volume of 1,800,000 pesos was small relative to about 40,000,000 silver pesos in circulation. See History of Philippine money. The currency was replaced by the modern peso in 1903.

In the beginning of the 20th century, an American Thomasite teacher described the paper currency of the Banco Español-Filipino as "printed on a kind of pink blotting paper which looked as if it would be easy to counterfeit."

== Denominations ==
Series	Denomination	No. of Printed
A	PF 200	250
B	PF 50	500
C	PF 25	600
D	PF 10	1,000

In 1868, the Spanish Revolution of 1868 overthrew Isabel II and forced her to exile in Paris. Upon hearing the news, the bank decided to rename itself as El Banco Español-Filipino, dropping the "Isabel II" from the name.

In 1877, the colonial government also began issuing peso fuerte-denominated treasury notes

Series	Denomination	No. of Printed
D	PF 25	unknown One Specimen Extant (Museo ng Bangko Sentral ng Pilipinas)
unknown	PF 10	unknown
unknown	PF 4	unknown
unknown	PF 1	unknown

== Gallery ==
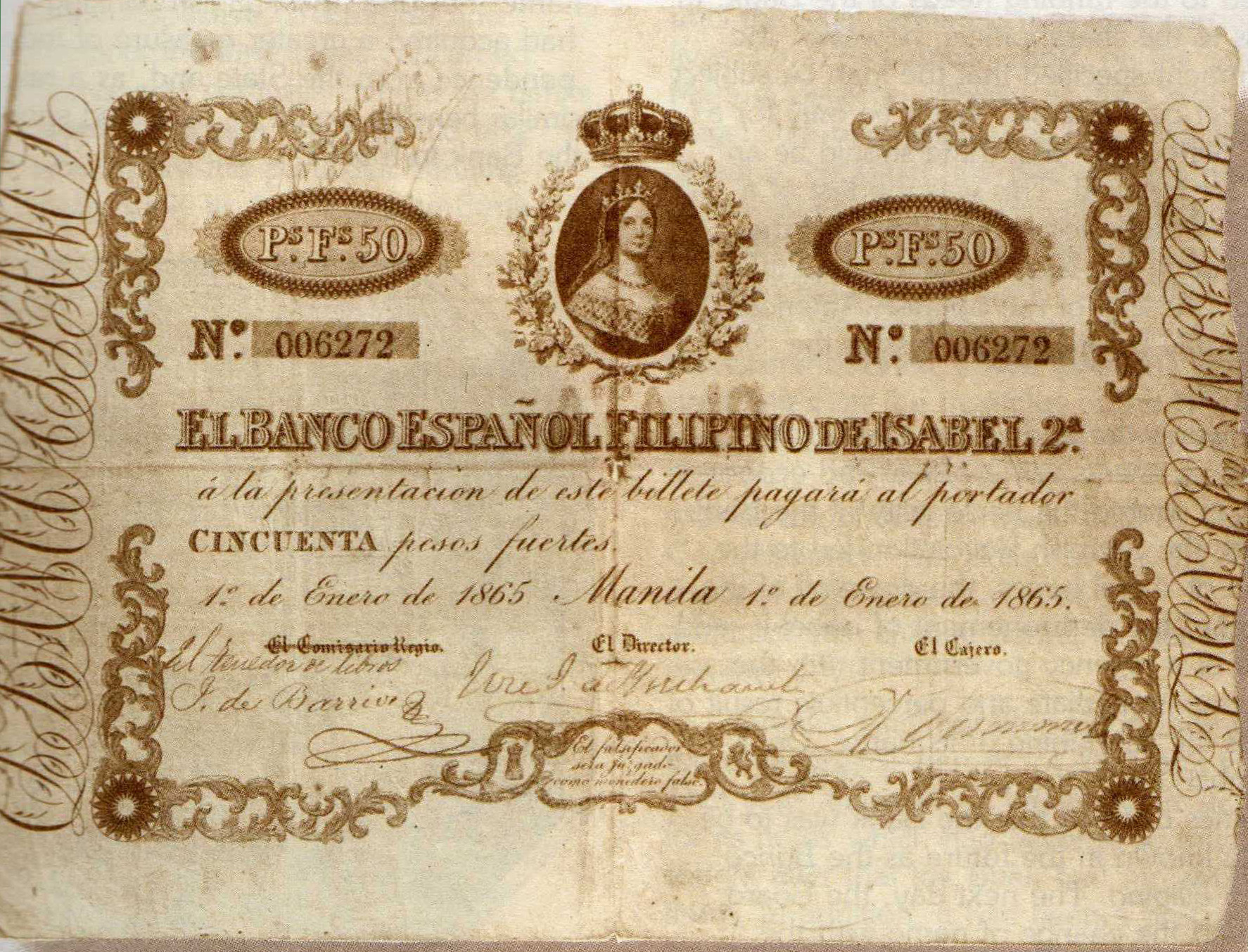
Cincuenta Pesos Fuertes (1852-1865)

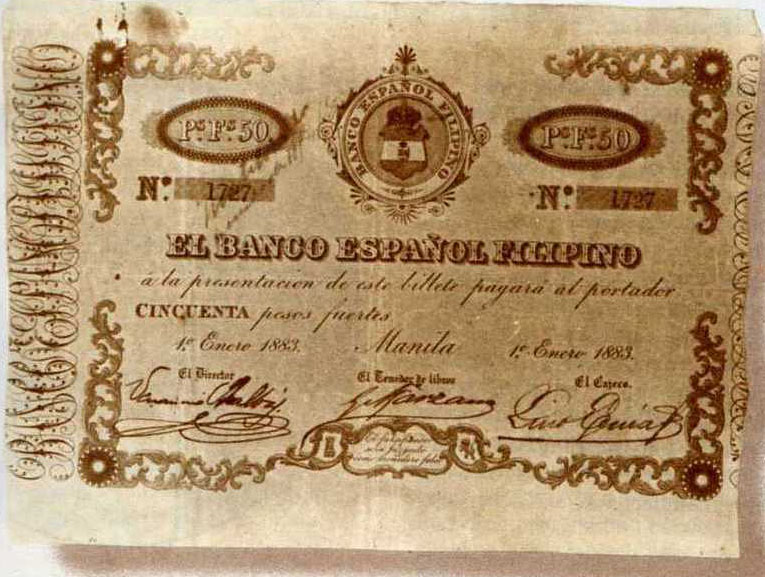
Cincuenta Pesos Fuertes (1883)

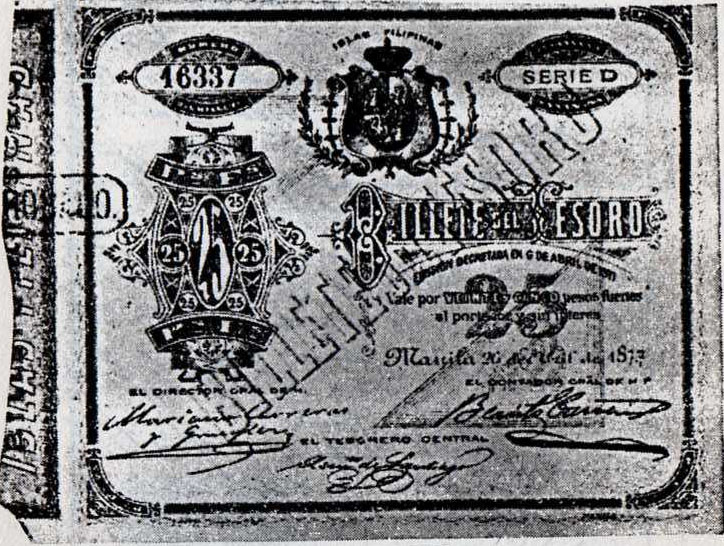
Veinte Cinco Pesos Fuertes (1877)

== See also ==
- Philippine peso
