= Piloncitos =

Gold coinage of pre-colonial Philippines

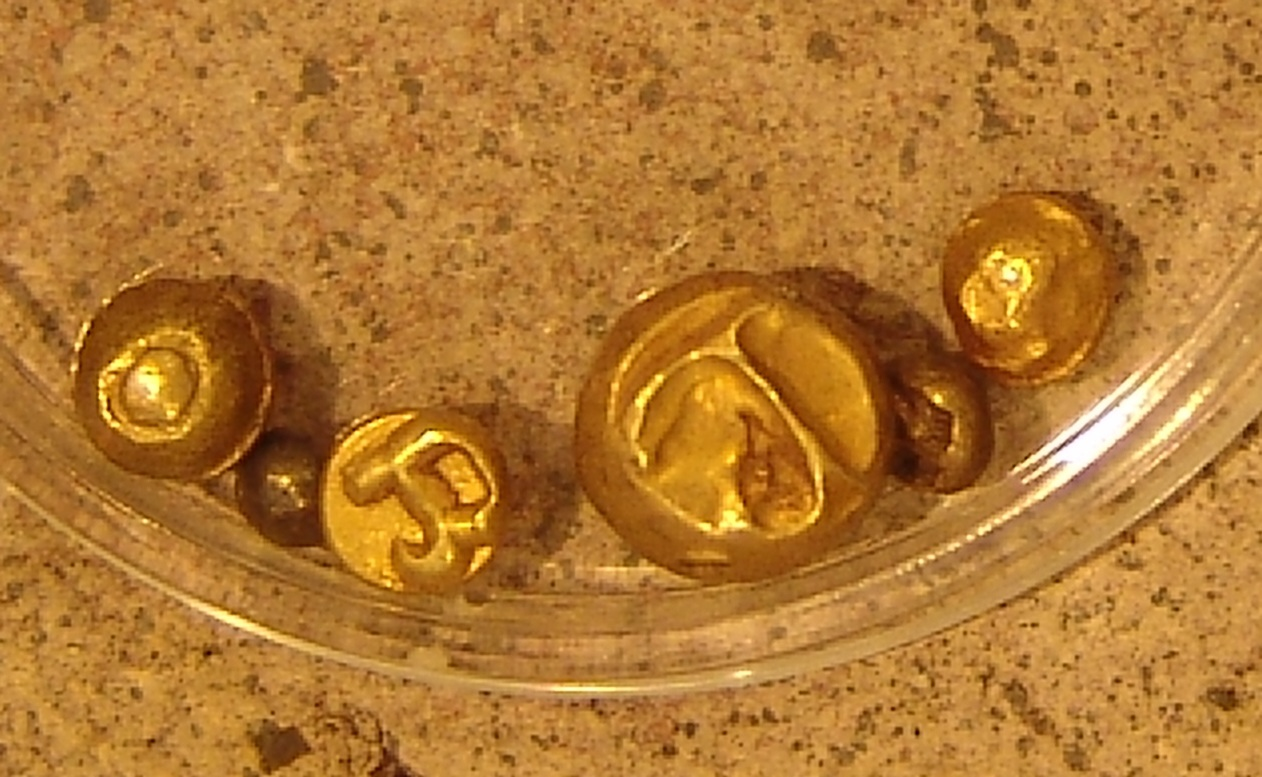
A collection of Piloncitos in Manila Mint Museum.

"Piloncitos" is a collectors' term for the bead-like gold masa coins used during the aristocratic era of the Philippines and in the early years of Spanish foreign rule, called bulawan ("gold piece") in many Philippine languages or salapi ("coin") or ginto ("gold piece") in Tagalog. These are pieces that formed part of various degrees of Southeast Asian gold weight such as amás (emas in Malay) or táhil. Gold coinage was used along with silver coinage in maritime Southeast Asian currency.

Such monetary gold pieces have been found throughout the Philippines, from places such as: Mandaluyong, Bataan, the banks of the Pasig River, Batangas, and Marinduque in Luzon; Samar and Leyte in the Visayas; and in some areas in Mindanao.

These gold coins are derivations of Southeast Asian silver coinage and may have evolved into the bullet or pod duang coinage of Sukhothai in Thailand.

The term "piloncitos" is commonly used by antique collectors who thought that the cone-shaped pieces looked like sugarloaves (pilón in Castilian). Spanish records described the gold coins as "grains of gold" ("granitas de oro").

== Historical usage ==
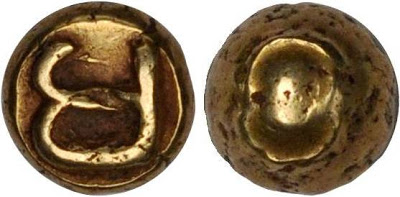
A piloncito with a Baybayin Ma (ᜋ) character

Early historical records document the extensive use of gold throughout the Philippine archipelago before the arrival of European colonists. It was used extensively as currency, and also used in everyday items such as clothing and finery.

Both ancient and modern goldsmiths exude exquisiteness in their craftsmanship for trade, personal vanity and prestige.

Piloncitos are the earliest form of precious metal based currency of Tondo, Namayan and Rajahnate of Butuan in present-day Philippines. It is likely made of pure gold with a weight ranging between 0.5 grams to more or less than 3 grams.

Piloncitos are tiny engraved bead-like gold bits unearthed in the Philippines. They are the first recognized coinage in the Philippines circulated between the 9th and 12th centuries. They emerged when increasing trade made barter inconvenient.

=== Descriptions ===
Piloncitos are so small—some are of the size of a corn kernel—and weigh from 0.09 to 2.65 grams of fine gold. Large piloncitos weighing 2.65 grams approximate the weight of one mass. Piloncitos have been excavated from Mandaluyong, Bataan, the banks of the Pasig River, Bumbungan River, Batangas, Marinduque, Samar, Leyte and some areas in Mindanao. They have been found in large numbers in Indonesian archeological sites leading to questions of origin. That gold was mined and worked in the Philippines is evidenced by many Spanish accounts, like one in 1586 that stated:

“The people of this island (Luzon) are very skillful in their handling of gold. They weigh it with the greatest skill and delicacy that have ever been seen. The first thing they teach their children is the knowledge of gold and the weights with which they weigh it, for there is no other money among them.”

=== Similarities in neighboring countries ===
Piloncitos are not exclusively found in the Philippines as most collectors and local historians state. Similar type of gold can be found in some regions of Indonesia which they call massa.

== Origins ==
In an era before coined money was widely used, Indo-Pacific beads were made first at a site called Arikamedu in South India ca. 200 BC. The manufacture then moved in sequence to Ceylon, South Thailand, Java and finally Malaya. By about 1200–1300 AD the larger Majapahit beads, excavated today in the interior of Java, had supplanted it. Since these factory sites have been dated, archaeologists now use the beads to date sites, though whether beads rose to the level of metals, salt, cloth, and cowries as "standard" trade goods is uncertain.

The first indigenous metallic coinage in the region, ca. 750–850 AD, comes from the Javanese kingdom of Sailendra (Chinese: Ho-ling). These roughly dome-shaped silver of irregular weight bore stamps of a flowing vase, and the sandalwood flower (quatefoil). By 850 AD weights had been standardized at 20 rattis to a Massa of about 2.4 grams. Silver and gold coins of Massa and fractional denominations were issued until about 1300 AD, with changes in shape and quality of inscription marking periods of issue. The gold piloncitos of the Philippines are a late offshoot of the gold coinage, while the bean-like silver "namo" series, of the Malay isthmus was presumably an offshoot of the silver coinage and may have evolved into the bullet coins of Siam.

== See also ==
- Barter rings
- Philippine peso
- Philippine real
- List of historical currencies
- History of Philippine money
- Photduang, a similar currency used in Siam

Preceded by No modern currencies (Barter rings or Sigay)	Philippine currency c.10th -16th century	Succeeded by Philippine real
