= Tin Animal Money =

Malay currency

Picture of Tin Animal Money, taken from the National History Museum at Jalan Raja, Kuala Lumpur.

Tin Animal Money is a form of currency believed to have been used by royal courts in the Malay Peninsula from the 15th through 18th centuries. It evolved into a form of currency used in Perak, Selangor, and Negeri Sembilan. The most common shape was that of a crocodile. Other forms include tortoises, elephants, fish, crickets, beetles, chickens, and other birds and animals such as goats, sheep, cows, etc. Animal Money was used as a means of exchange.

Tin Animal Money.

== See also ==
- Malaysian ringgit
- Ringgit
- Sultanate of Malacca
- Tin ingot
