= Tin ingot =

Trading currency of Malacca

Malaccan tin ingots in the National History Museum of Kuala Lumpur.

Tin ingots (Chinese: 斗锡) were a trading currency unique to Malacca.

Cast in the shape of a peck, or dou in Chinese, each ingot weighs just over 1 pound (0.45 kg). Ten blocks made up one unit called a small bundle, and 40 blocks made up one large bundle.

Details of tin production in early Malacca were recorded in the 1436 book Description of the Starry Raft by Fei Xin, a translator of Admiral Zheng He.

== See also ==
- Tin Animal Money
