= Libra jaquesa =

Jaca pound
Libra jaquesa
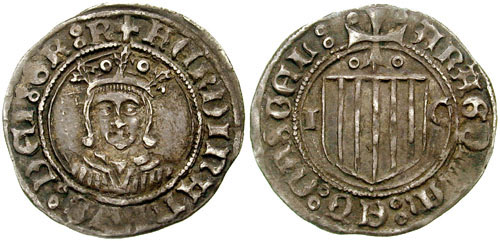
- An Aragonese silver coin worth one sueldo jaqués

Denominations
- Subunit
- 20:1: Sueldo jaqués

Demographics
- User(s): Kingdom of Aragon
- This infobox shows the latest status before this currency was rendered obsolete.

The libra jaquesa or Jaca pound was a type of coin that was used in the Kingdom of Aragon from the 11th and 12th centuries until after 1800 as a unit of account. It was not minted but instead served as a reference for the value of minted coins. Its value was equivalent to 20 sueldos jaqueses or 320 dineros. Its name originates from the Aragonese city of Jaca.

The one-pound silver unit of mass was subdivided into 240 silver pieces, also called dineros. The sueldo was a gold coin of the same weight as a silver piece. Since gold and silver maintained until the modern era a ratio of 12:1, each sueldo was equivalent to 12 dinero units, and the silver pound was equivalent to 20 sueldos. One of the most commonly circulated coins was the pieza, which was worth eight sueldos, and another was the peseta, equivalent to seven sueldos or, interchangeably, a week's salary of a manual laborer.
