= History of Philippine money =

The history of Philippine money covers currency in use before the Hispanic era with gold Piloncitos and other commodities in circulation, as well as the adoption of the peso during the Hispanic era and afterwards.

The Philippine peso is ultimately derived from the Spanish peso or pieces of eight brought over in large quantities by the Manila galleons of the 16th to 19th centuries. From the same Spanish peso or dollar is derived the various pesos of Latin America, the dollars of the US and Hong Kong, as well as the Chinese yuan and the Japanese yen.

== History ==
Long before the Spaniards came to the Philippines in 1521, the Filipinos had established trade relations with neighboring lands like China, Java, Borneo, Thailand and other settlements. Barter was a system of trading commonly practiced throughout the world and adopted by the Philippines. The inconvenience of the barter system led to the adoption of a specific medium of exchange – the cowry shells. Cowries produced in gold, jade, quartz and wood became the most common and acceptable form of money through multiple centuries.

The Philippines is naturally rich in gold, making possible the availability of local gold coinage called piloncitos. The original silver currency unit was the rupee or rupiah (known locally as salapi), brought over by trade with India and Indonesia. The salapi continued under Spanish rule as a teston worth four reales or half a Spanish peso.

== Early Philippine history (c. 900 AD–1565) ==
=== Piloncitos ===
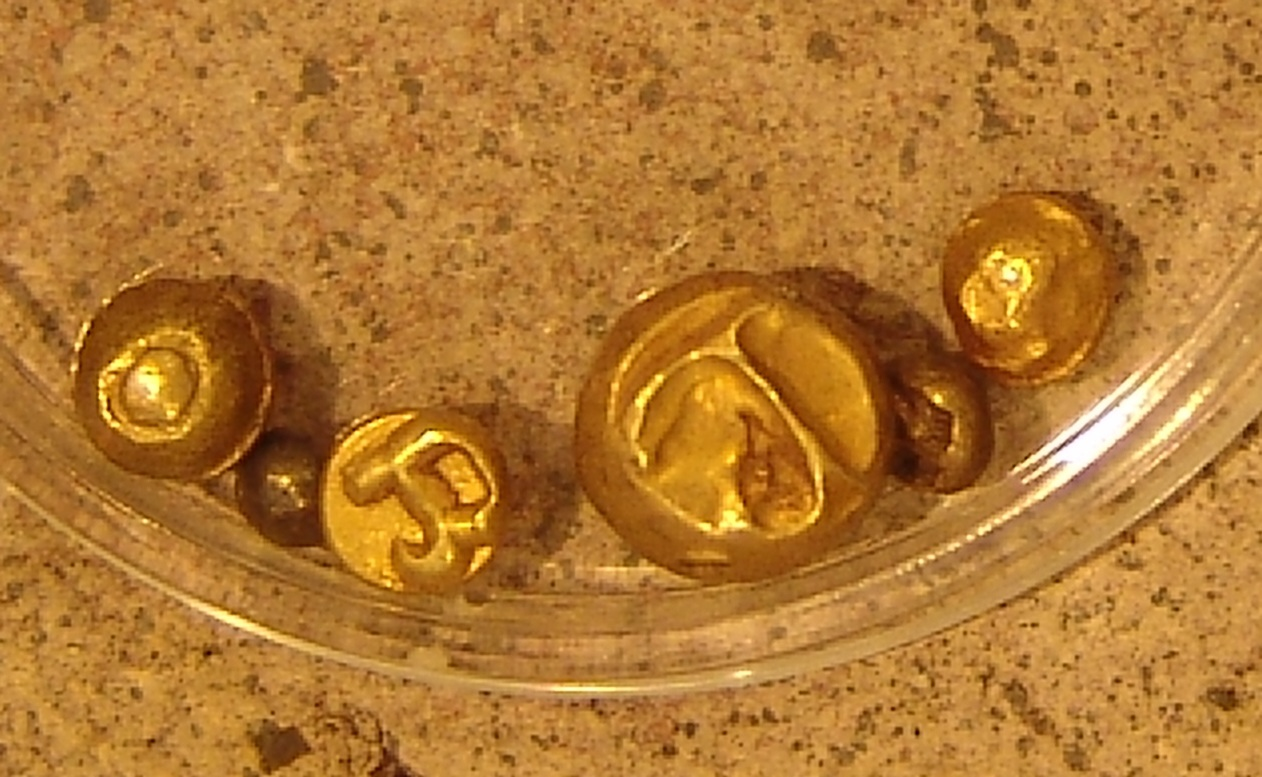
A collection of Piloncitos in Manila Mint Museum.

Piloncitos were used in Tondo, Namayan and Rajahnate of Butuan in present-day Philippines. Piloncitos are tiny engraved bead-like gold bits unearthed in the Philippines. They are the first recognized coinage in the Philippines circulated between the 9th and 12th centuries. They emerged when increasing trade made barter inconvenient.

Piloncitos are so small—some are of the size of a corn kernel—and weigh from 0.09 to 2.65 grams (0.0032 to 0.0935 oz) of fine gold. Large Piloncitos weigh almost 1 mace, or 1/10th of a tael. Piloncitos have been excavated from Mandaluyong, Bataan, the banks of the Pasig River, Batangas, Marinduque, Samar, Leyte and some areas in Mindanao. They have been found in large numbers in Indonesian archeological sites leading to questions of origin. That gold was mined and worked here is evidenced by multiple Spanish accounts, like one in 1586 that said:

“The people of this island (Luzon) are Hindu and very skillful in their handling of gold. They weigh it with the greatest skill and delicacy that have ever been seen. The first thing they teach their children is the knowledge of gold and the weights with which they weigh it, for there is no other money among them.”

=== Barter rings ===
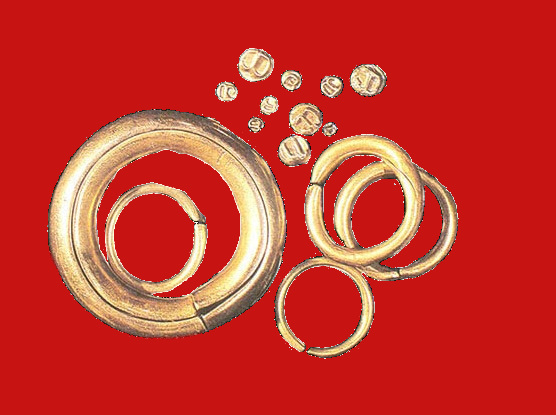
The gold currencies: (upper part) the Piloncitos and the Barter rings (lower part).

The early Filipinos also traded along with the Barter rings, which is gold ring-like ingots. These barter rings are bigger than a doughnut in size and are made of nearly pure gold.

== Imported Chinese cash ==
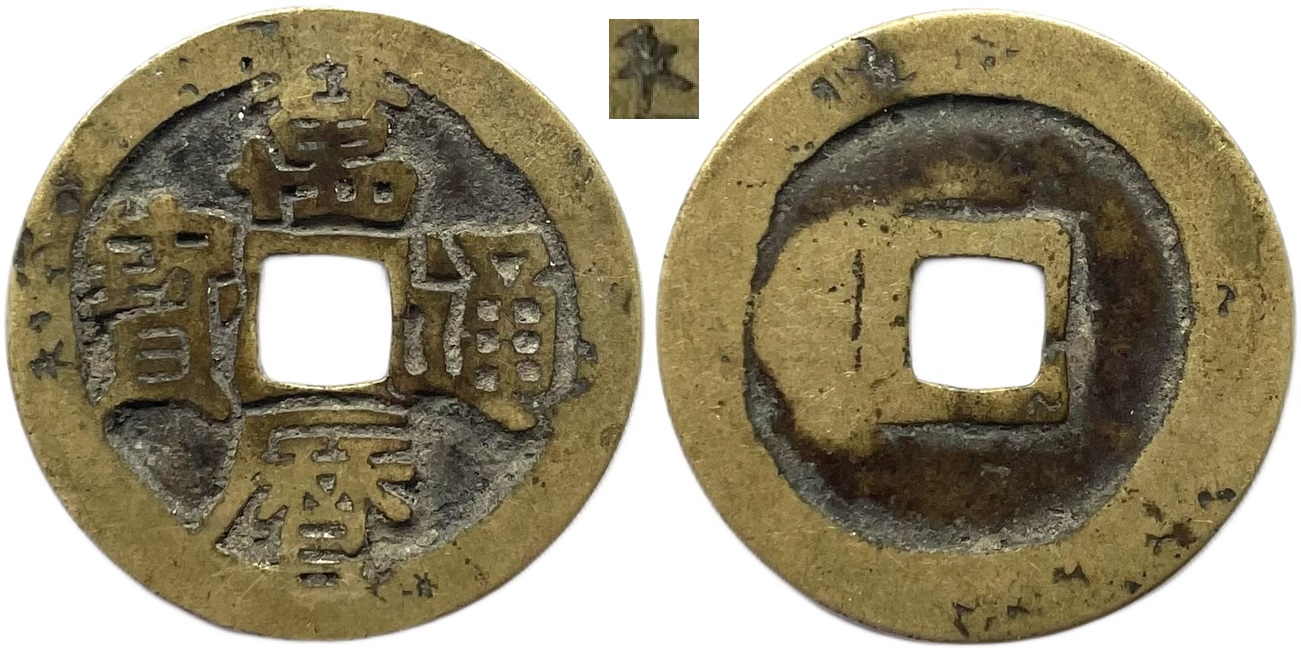
Wanli Tongbao coin with tiny chopmarks on the rims (notably Tian 天 on obverse left), believed to have been produced in Manila

A relatively unknown chapter of Philippine numismatics is the importation and usage of bronze Chinese cash in Philippine markets. Like other Southeast Asian ports, the Chinese coinage flooded trading ports in the Philippine Islands starting as early as the 13th century and continuing into the Qing Dynasty period.

One issue of coinage, the Wanli Tongbao, which was issued during the Wanli period of the Ming Dynasty, frequently bear post-mint chopmarks on the rims. These chopmarks have been attributed to Chinese merchants based in Manila around the late 16th or early 17th century, making the so-called Manila Chopmarks on the Wanli coins the earliest chopmarks known.

== Spanish era (1565–1898) ==
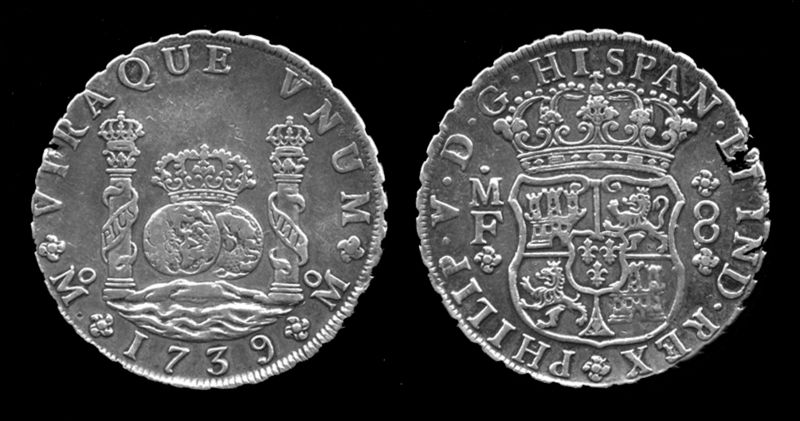
Silver columnario peso imported from Spanish Latin America 1726–1770.

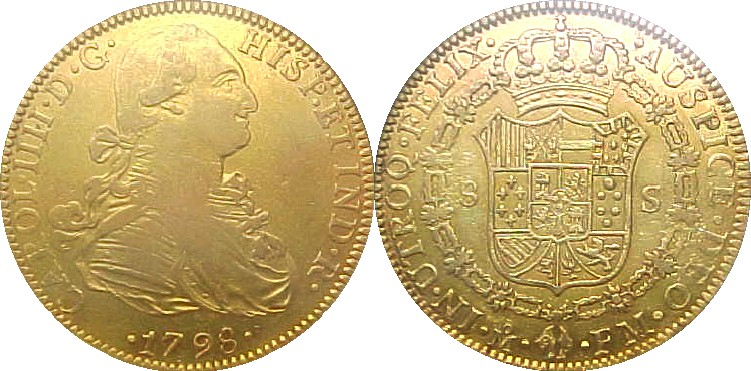
Spanish gold onza or 8 escudo coin imported from Spanish Latin America and valued at 16 silver pesos.

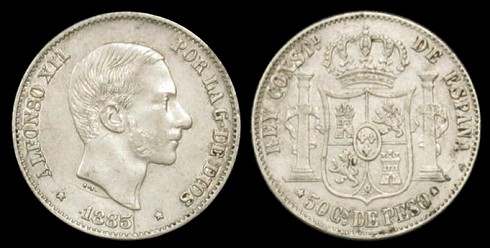
Silver 50-centimo coin issued 1864 until the 1890s

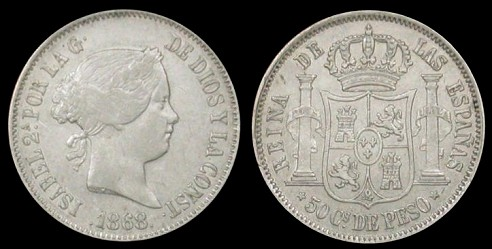
Silver 50 centimo Isabel II issued 1864

The Spanish silver peso worth eight reales was first introduced by the Magellan expedition of 1521 and brought in large quantities by the Manila galleons after the 1565 conquest of the Philippines. The local salapi continued under Spanish rule as a half-peso coin. Additionally, Spanish gold onzas or eight-escudo coins were also introduced with identical weight to the Spanish dollar but valued at 16 silver pesos.

=== Silver Cobs and Columnarios ===
The earliest silver coins brought in by the galleons from Mexico and other Spanish colonies were in the form of roughly-cut cobs or macuquinas. These coins usually bore a cross on one side and the Spanish royal coat-of-arms on the other. Locals called these crudely made coins "hilis-kalamay" due to its resemblance to flattened rice cakes. These were replaced starting 1726 by machine-minted coins called Columnarios (pillar dollars) or dos mundos (two worlds) containing 27.07 grams (0.955 oz) of 0.917 fine silver (revised to 0.903 fine in 1771).

These pillar dollars circulated extensively not only in the Philippines but all over the world in the 18th and 19th centuries due to its beauty of design, consistency of weight and fineness, universal recognition among merchants worldwide, and a serrated edge which prevented the clipping away of the precious metal. From the same Spanish peso or dollar is derived the various pesos of Latin America, the dollars of the US and Hong Kong, as well as the Chinese yuan and the Japanese yen.

=== Fractional currency and Cuartos ===
Silver coins were minted in denominations of 8 real ($1) and 4, 2, 1 and 1/2 real. Gold coins came in denominations of 8 escudos ($16) and 4, 2, 1 and 1/2 escudos. Small change was also made by cutting a whole $1 coin, most commonly into eight wedges each worth one Spanish real.

Locally produced crude copper or bronze coins called cuartos or barrillas were also struck in the Philippines by order of the Spanish government. From this came the Filipino words “kwarta” (synonymous to money in general) and “barya” (small change). In 1837, an order was issued that 20 such cuartos be counted as one real (hence, 160 cuartos to a peso).

The discontinuation in the 19th century of officially minted copper cuartos was alleviated in part by counterfeit two-cuarto coins (worth 80 to a peso) made by Igorot copper miners in the Cordilleras and accepted in circulation by the rest of the country.

=== Stamped Philippine Currency ===
In the early part of the 19th century, most of the Spanish colonies in Central and South America revolted and declared independence from Spain. They issued silver coins bearing revolutionary slogans and symbols which reached the Philippines. The Spanish government officials in the islands were fearful that the seditious markings would incite Filipinos to rebellion. Thus they removed the inscriptions by counter stamping the coins with the word F7 or YII.

A currency system derived from coins imported from Spain, China and neighboring countries was fraught with various difficulties. Money came in different coinages, and fractional currency in addition to the real and the cuarto also existed. Peso coins with Spanish or Mexican designs are also easily imported and exported overseas, occasionally emptying government and private coffers. Money has nearly always been scarce in Manila, and when it was abundant it was shipped to the provinces. An 1857 decree requiring the keeping of accounts in pesos and centimos (worth 1/100 of a peso) was of little help to the situation given the existence of copper cuartos worth 160 to a peso.

=== Philippine Gold / Silver Bimetallic Standard in the 19th century ===
The Spanish gold onza (or 8-escudo coin) was of identical weight to the Spanish dollar but was officially valued at 16 silver pesos, thus putting the peso on a bimetallic standard with a gold/silver ratio of 16. Its divergence with the value of gold in international trade featured prominently in the continued monetary crises of the 19th century.

The California gold rush of 1848-1855 meant the gold onza, officially valued at 16 pesos, fetched only about 15 pesos internationally, and it in fact suffered as much as a 33% discount when paid to Chinese merchants who consistently count in silver pesos. As the Spanish government continued to receive these gold onzas as 16 pesos, there eventually came a time when silver pesos became scarce and only gold 16-peso coins remained in circulation.

In order to remedy this damage in the monetary situation, Queen Isabella II issued a decree in 1857 ordering the founding of the Casa de Moneda de Manila in the Philippines in order to coin gold 1-, 2- and 4-peso coins according to Spanish standards (the 4-peso coin being 6.766 grams (0.2387 oz) of 0.875 gold). The first gold coins were minted in 1861. In the same year, a royal decree ordered the minting of 50-, 20- and 10-centimo silver coins out of Latin American coins also according to Spanish standards (with 100 centimos containing 25.98 grams (0.916 oz) of 0.900 silver). The price of silver has since gone down and the first silver coins were minted in 1864.

The relative abundance of gold in the Philippines then came to an end with the adoption of the British gold standard now American Gold Standard in most of Europe after 1871 and the subsequent climb in the international gold/silver ratio above 16. It was further aggravated by an 1876 decree confirming the Mexican peso as legal tender in the Philippines and exchangeable with the gold onza for 16 pesos. The climb in the gold onza's overseas value above 16 pesos soon made importing Mexican dollars in exchange for gold coins a profitable venture. While the Governor General attempted in 1877 to stem the outflow of gold by limiting the legal tender status of Mexican silver, by 1884 gold coin had entirely disappeared.

The 19th century therefore ended with the Philippine peso still officially on a bimetallic standard equal to either the silver Mexican peso (weighing 27.07 grams (0.955 oz) of 0.903 fine or 0.786-troy-ounce (0.862 oz; 24.4 g) of XAG) or 1/16th the gold onza (weighing 1.6915 grams (0.05967 oz) of 0.875 fine or 0.0476-troy-ounce (0.0522 oz; 1.48 g) XAU). The gold peso, however, has since increased in value to approx. two silver pesos. Furthermore, the fineness of Philippine fractional silver coins was reduced from 0.900 to 0.835 and worsened the quality of the local currency, and the introduction of Alfonsino silver coins in 1897 did little to improve the peso's exchange value. Such Mexican and Spanish-Filipino coins remained in circulation until they were demonetized after the introduction of the new US-Philippine peso in 1903.

=== Peso Fuerte Banknotes ===
The first paper money circulated in the Philippines was the Philippine peso fuerte issued in 1851 by the country's first bank, the Banco Español-Filipino. Being bimetallic and convertible to either silver pesos or gold onzas, its volume of 1,800,000 pesos was small relative to about 40,000,000 silver pesos in circulation at the end of the 19th century.

=== Sulu coins ===
The Sultanate of Sulu in the southernmost islands engaged actively in barter trade with the Arabs, Han Chinese, Bornean, Moluccan, and British traders. The Sultans issued coins of their own as early as the 5th century. Coins of Sultan Azimud Din that exist today are of base metal Tin, Silver and alloy bearing Arabic inscriptions and dated 1148 AH corresponding to the year 1735 in the Christian era.

== First Philippine Republic (Revolutionary period 1898–1899) ==
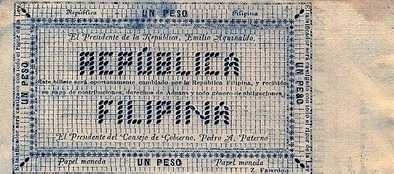
The one Peso note of the First Philippine Republic.

The Philippine Republic of 1898 under General Emilio Aguinaldo issued currency backed by the country's natural resources. Two types of two-centavo copper coins were struck at the Malolos arsenal and one and two peso paper notes hand signed by Pedro Paterno, Mariano Limjap and Telesforo Chuidian were printed and freely circulated. These were withdrawn from circulation and declared illegal currency after the surrender of General Aguinaldo to the Americans.

== American colonial period (1901–1946) ==
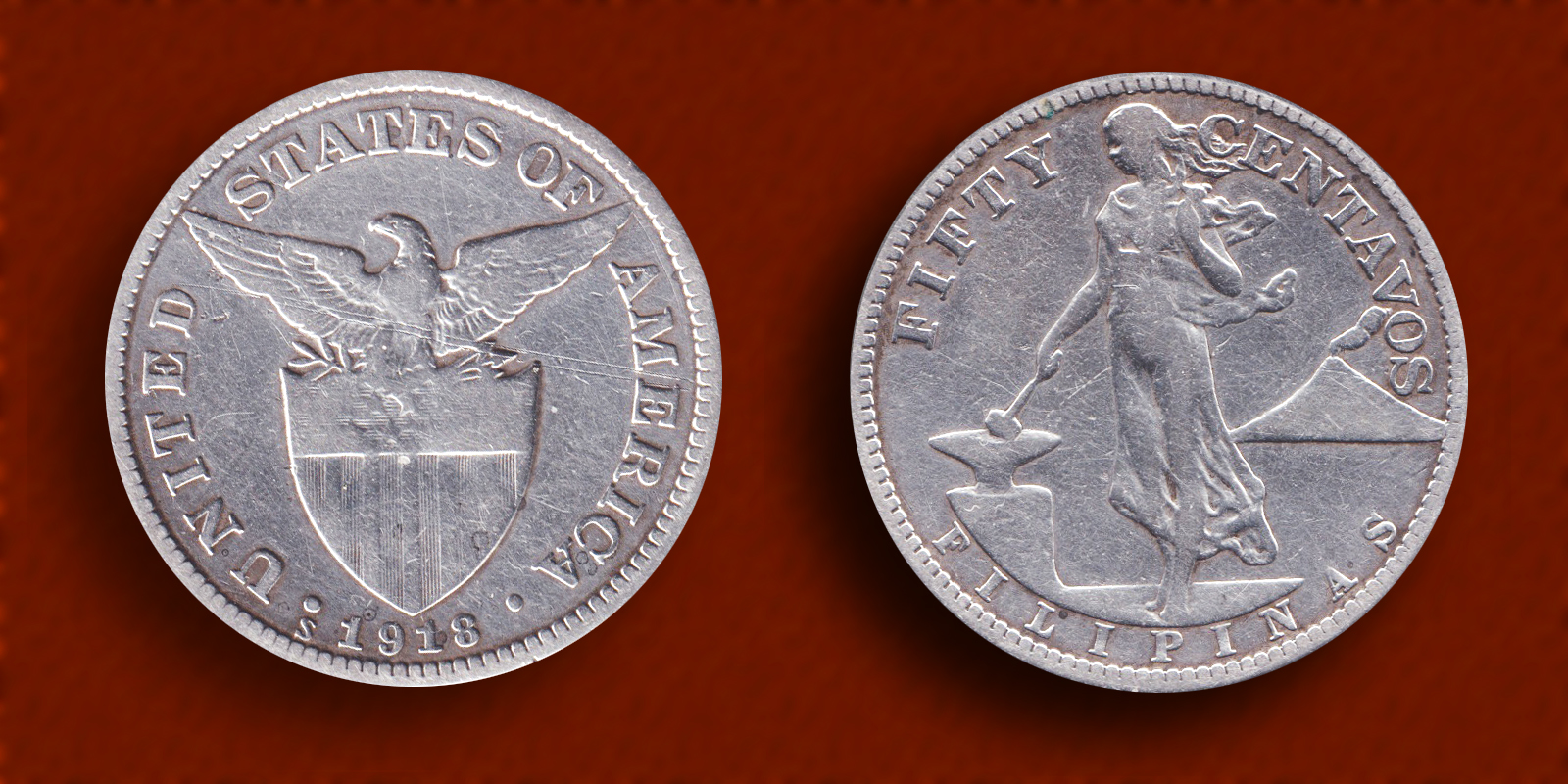
US Administration 50 centavos silver coin minted in San Francisco in 1918.

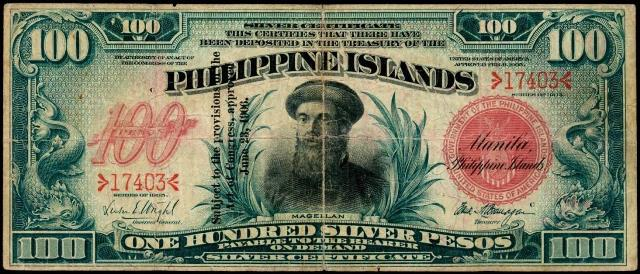
US Administration 100 peso bill.

After the United States took control of the Philippines, the United States Congress passed the Philippine Coinage Act of 1903, established the unit of currency to be a theoretical gold peso (not coined) consisting of 12.9 grains of gold 0.900 fine (0.0241875 XAU), equivalent to ₱2,640 as of December 22, 2010. This unit was equivalent to exactly half the value of a U.S. dollar. Its peg to gold was maintained until the gold content of the US dollar was reduced in 1934. Its peg of ₱2 to the US dollar was maintained until independence in 1946.

The act provided for the coinage and issuance of Philippine silver pesos substantially of the weight and fineness as the Mexican peso, which should be of the value of 50 cents gold and redeemable in gold at the insular treasury, and which was intended to be the sole circulating medium among the people. The act also provided for the coinage of subsidiary and minor coins and for the issuance of silver certificates in denominations of not less than 2 nor more than 10 pesos (maximum denomination increased to 500 pesos in 1906).

It also provided for the creation of a gold-standard fund to maintain the parity of the coins so authorized to be issued and authorized the insular government to issue temporary certificates of indebtedness bearing interest at a rate not to exceed 4 per cent per annum, payable not more than one year from date of issue, to an amount which should not at any one time exceed 10 million dollars or 20 million pesos.

== Commonwealth period (1935–1946) ==
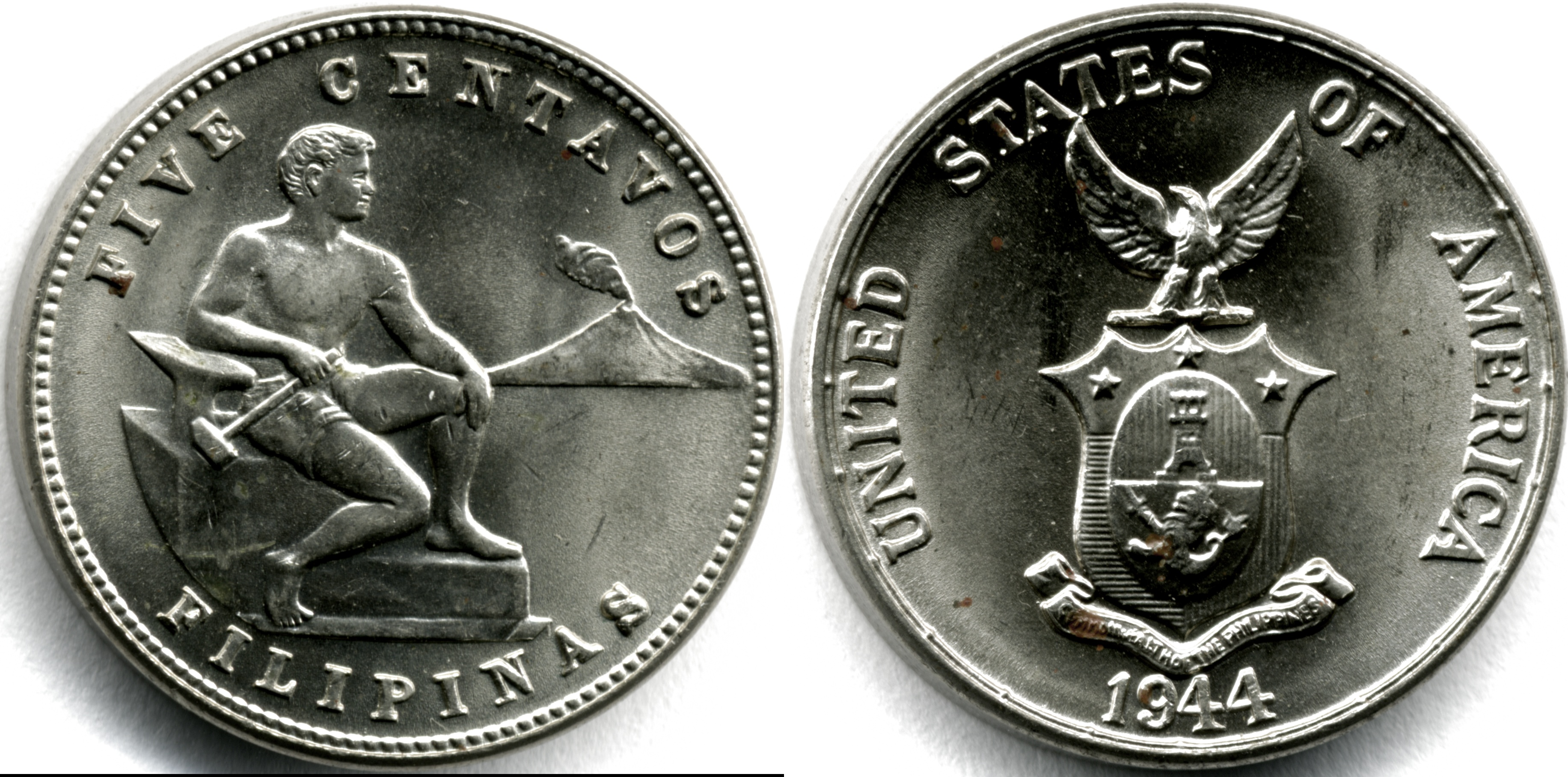
1944 Philippines five Centavo coin

When the Philippines became a U.S. Commonwealth in 1935, the coat of arms of the Philippine Commonwealth were adopted and replaced the arms of the US Territories on the reverse of coins while the obverse remained unchanged. This seal is composed of a much smaller eagle with its wings pointed up, perched over a shield with peaked corners, above a scroll reading "Commonwealth of the Philippines". It is a much busier pattern, and widely considered less attractive.

=== The "Mickey Mouse money" (Fiat peso) ===
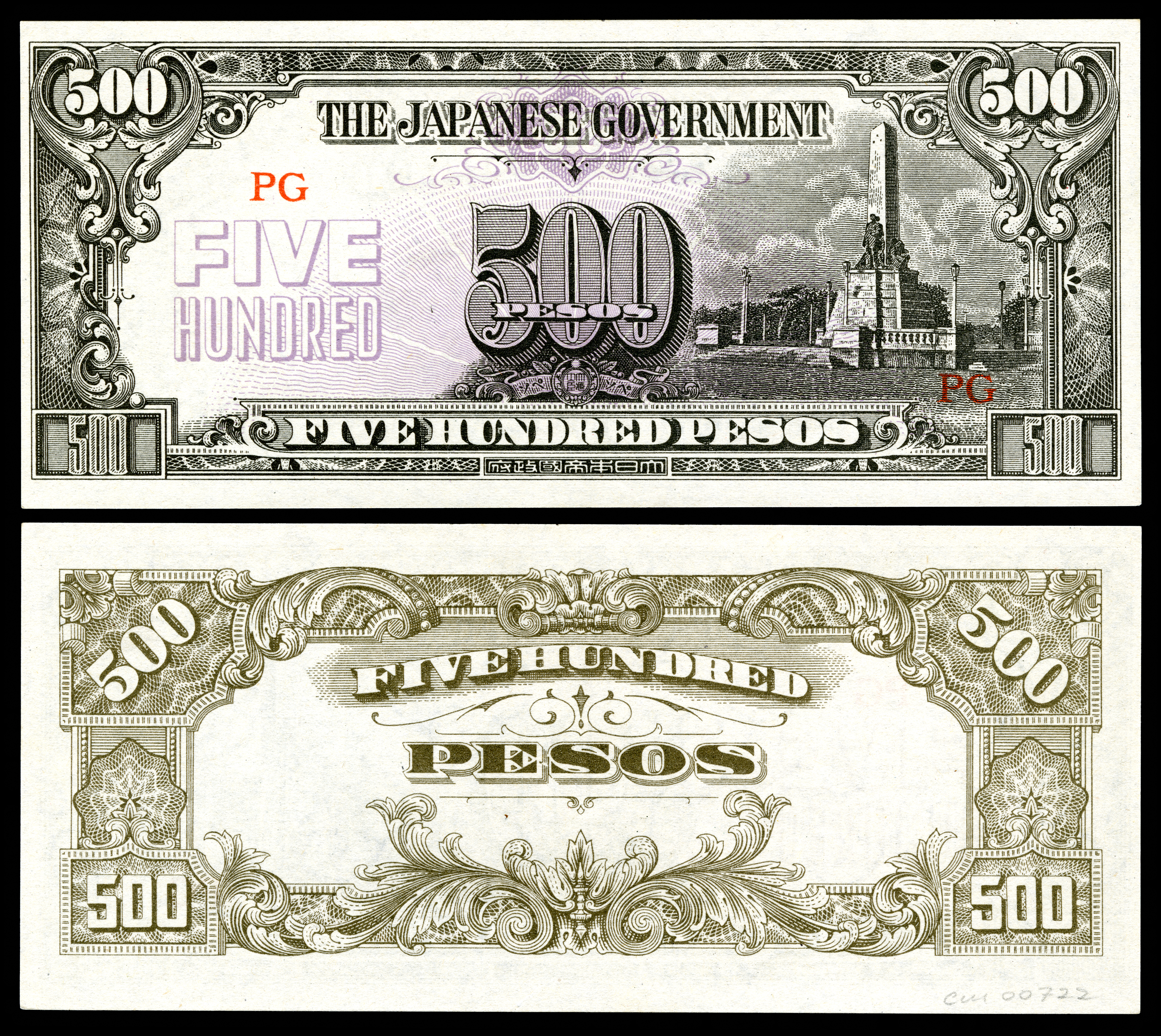
The peso issued by the Japanese government nicknamed as "The Mickey Mouse money".

During World War II in the Philippines, the occupying Japanese government-issued fiat currency in several denominations; this is known as the Japanese government-issued Philippine fiat peso (see also Japanese invasion money). The Second Philippine Republic under José P. Laurel outlawed possession of guerrilla currency, and declared a monopoly on the issuance of money, so that anyone found to possess guerrilla notes could be arrested. Some Filipinos called the fiat peso "Mickey Mouse money". Some survivors of the war tell stories of going to the market laden with suitcases or "bayóng" (native bags made of woven coconut or buri leaf strips) overflowing with the Japanese-issued bills. According to one witness, 75 "Mickey Mouse" pesos, or about 35 U.S. dollars at that time, could buy one duck egg. In 1944, a box of matches cost more than 100 Mickey Mouse pesos.

=== "Guerilla Pesos" (Emergency circulating notes) ===
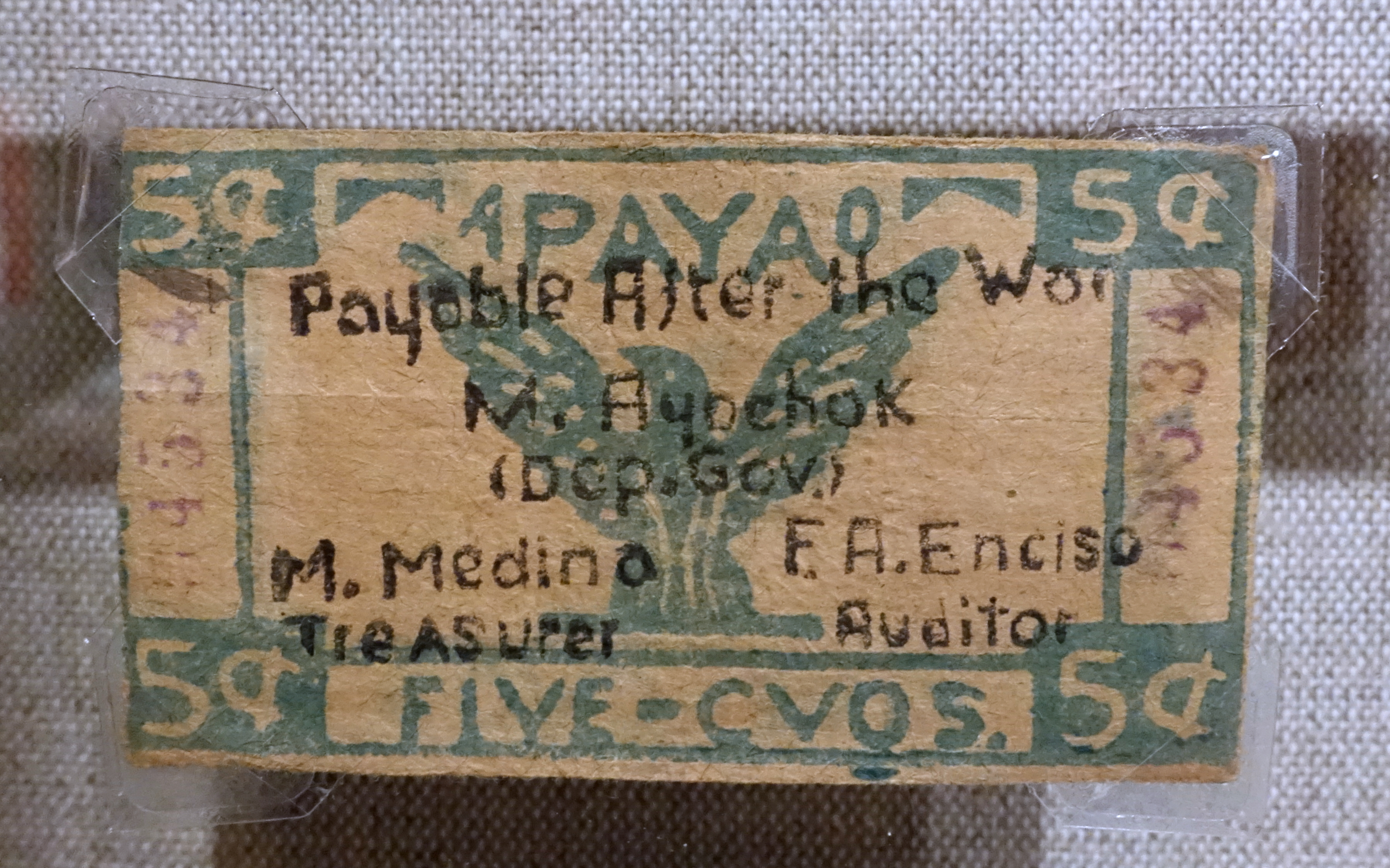
5 centavo emergency circulating note, Apayo

The Emergency circulating notes were currency printed by the Philippine Commonwealth Government in exile during World War II. These "guerrilla pesos" were printed by local government units and banks using crude inks and materials. Due to the inferior quality of these bills, they were easily mutilated. The Japanese-sponsored Second Philippine Republic under President José P. Laurel outlawed possession of guerrilla currency and declared a monopoly on the issuance of money and anyone found to possess guerrilla notes could be arrested or even executed.

== Modern currencies (1946–present) ==
=== English Series ===
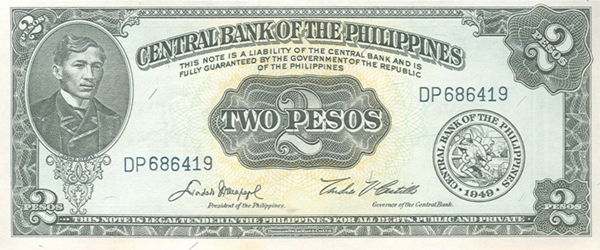
The two peso note of the English series.

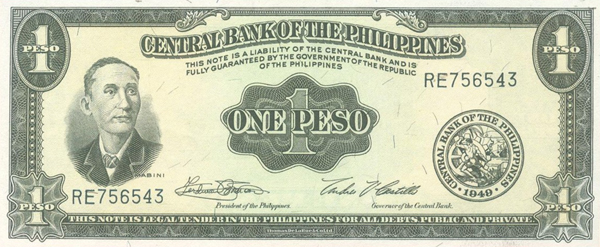
The one peso note of the English series.

The English Series were Philippine banknotes that circulated from 1951 to 1971. It was the only banknote series of the Philippine peso to use English as its language.

=== Pilipino series ===
The Pilipino Series banknotes is the name used to refer to Philippine banknotes issued by the Central Bank of the Philippines from 1969 to 1973, during the term of President Ferdinand Marcos. It was succeeded by the Ang Bagong Lipunan Series of banknotes, to which it shared a similar design. The lowest denomination of the series is 1-piso and the highest is 100-piso. This series represented a radical change from the English series. The bills underwent Filipinization and a design change. After the declaration of Proclamation № 1081 on September 23, 1972, the Central Bank demonetized the existing banknotes (both the English and Pilipino series) on March 1, 1974, pursuant to Presidential Decree No. 378. All the unissued banknotes were sent back to the De La Rue plant in London for overprinting the watermark area with the words "ANG BAGONG LIPUNAN" and an oval geometric safety design.

=== Ang Bagong Lipunan series ===
The Ang Bagong Lipunan Series (literally, ”The New Society Series") is the name used to refer to Philippine banknotes issued by the Central Bank of the Philippines from 1973 to 1985. It was succeeded by the New Design series of banknotes. The lowest denomination of the series is 2-piso and the highest is 100-piso. After the declaration of Proclamation № 1081 by President Ferdinand Marcos on September 23, 1972, the Central Bank was to demonetize the existing banknotes in 1974, pursuant to Presidential Decree 378. All the unissued Pilipino Series banknotes (except the one peso banknote) were sent back to the De La Rue plant in London for overprinting the watermark area with the words "ANG BAGONG LIPUNAN" and an oval geometric safety design. The one peso note was replaced with the two peso note, which features the same elements of the demonetized "Pilipino" series one peso note. On September 7, 1978, the Security Printing Plant in Quezon City was inaugurated to produce the banknotes. And a minor change of its BSP seal.

=== New Design Series ===
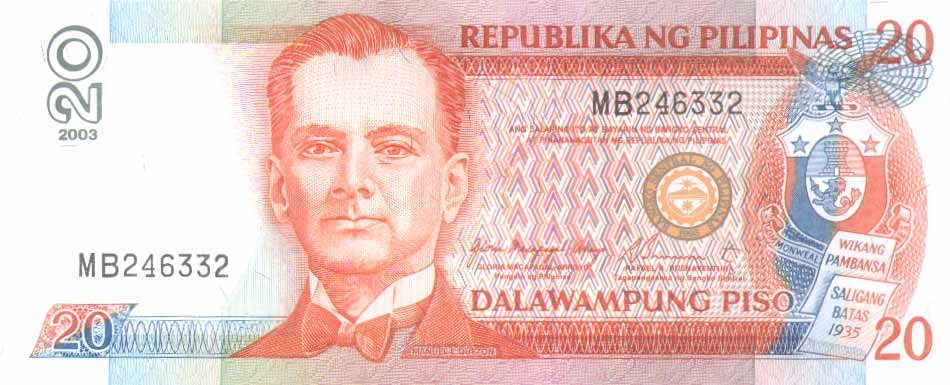
The 20 peso note of the New Design/BSP series (NDS/BSP).

The New Design Series (NDS) (also known as the BSP Series after the establishment of the Bangko Sentral ng Pilipinas) was the name used to refer to banknotes of the Philippine peso issued from 1985 to 2013 and the coins of the Philippine peso issued from 1995 to 2017. The coins were minted and issued from c. December 1995 to November 30, 2017, and remain legal tender as of 2023. It was succeeded by the New Generation Currency Series (NGC) Series issued on December 16, 2010, for banknotes and November 30, 2017, for coins.

The NDS banknotes were printed until 2013 (but 5-peso notes were printed until 1995, 10-peso notes until 2001, 20 and 1000 peso notes until 2012, and 50, 100, 200 and 500 peso notes until 2013), were legal tender until December 31, 2015, and could be exchanged with newer notes until the series' demonetization on January 3, 2018. Thus the NDS co-existed with NGC banknotes from December 16, 2010, to January 3, 2018.

=== New Generation Currency (current) ===
The New Generation Currency (NGC) project started in 2007 with a formal conceptualization process which was a result of the meeting of the minds of people with diverse backgrounds and ideas: central bankers, artists, technocrats, historians, communication experts, and currency printers to further enhance security features and to improve durability. The NGC project took three years during which the thematic content, designs, and security features were discussed and evaluated by the BSP's Numismatic Committee (Num Com) in consultation with the Monetary Board (MB) and, subsequently, with the approval of the BSP Governor and the President of the Philippines.

The members of the numismatic committee included Bangko Sentral Deputy Governor Diwa Guinigundo and Dr Ambeth Ocampo, chairman of the National Historical Institute. The new banknotes' designs, by Studio 5 Designs and Design Systemat, feature famous Filipinos and iconic natural wonders. Philippine national symbols will be depicted on coins. The BSP started releasing the initial batch of new banknotes, and the new designs were released to the public on December 16, 2010: three years after the project was started. The word "Pilipino" used in the bills was rendered in Baybayin (ᜉᜒᜎᜒᜉᜒᜈᜓ). The font used for lettering in the banknotes is Myriad, while the numerals are set in the Twentieth Century font. The series was approved by Presidents Gloria Macapagal Arroyo and her immediate successor Benigno Aquino III, making this the only banknote series to be approved by two presidents.
