= Philippine real =

The Philippine real was the currency of the Philippines during the Spanish Colonial Era. Brought over in large quantities by the Manila galleons, eight silver reales made up a silver peso or a dollar. 16 silver real were equal to one gold escudo.

== History ==
=== Pre-Hispanic Period ===
Trade among the early Filipinos and with traders from the neighboring islands was conducted through barter. The inconvenience of barter later led to the use of some objects as a medium of exchange. Gold, which was plentiful in many parts of the islands, invariably found its way into these objects that included the piloncitos, small bead-like gold bits considered by the local numismatists as the earliest coin of the ancient Filipinos, and gold barter rings.

=== Spanish Colonial Period ===
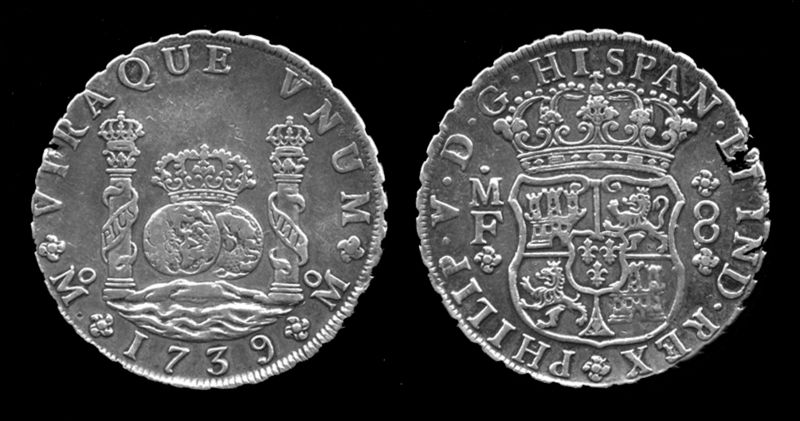
Silver columnario peso or 8 reales imported from Spanish Latin America 1726-1770.

Spanish-American coins minted to the currency system of 8 reales = 1 peso were brought over by the Manila galleons between the 16th and 19th centuries. The first coins brought over were odd-shaped silver cobs called macuquinas or hilis-kalamay. They were then succeeded starting 1726 by the famous columnarios (silver pillar dollars) or dos mundos.

These were then replaced by coins from newly independent Latin American countries in the 19th century, whose designs were counter-stamped in the 1830s by Spanish authorities in Manila. The final change involved revising the peso's subdivision from 1 peso = 8 reales to 1 peso = 100 centimos, made possible by the introduction of new 10, 20 and 50 centimos de peso coins starting 1864.

== Coins ==
Silver coins were imported from Latin America in denominations of 8 real ($1) and 4, 2, 1 and 1/2 real. Gold coins also from Latin America came in denominations of 8 escudos ($16) and 4, 2, 1 and 1/2 escudos.

In the 18th century, the Royalty of Spain authorized the minting of local copper coins by the Ayuntamiento (Municipality) of Manila in response to the acute shortage of fractional coins. These were called barrillas and first appeared in 1728 in denominations of 1/2 quarto (1 octavo) and 1, 2 and 4 quartos. 20 quartos made up 1 real, hence 160 quartos to a peso.

Coins from other Spanish colonies that reached the Philippines were counterstamped. From 1828, the word "MANILA" was stamped on the coins. In around 1830, the machinery of the "MANILA" counterstamp broke, so, in 1832, the king's initials "F 7" were used, changing in 1834 to those of his successor, "YII". When Spain recognized its former Latin American colonies in 1837, the practice of counterstamping stopped.

| Preceded by Piloncitos | Currency of the Philippines; 1728-1852 | Succeeded by Philippine peso |
