= Sierra Leonean dollar =

Currency

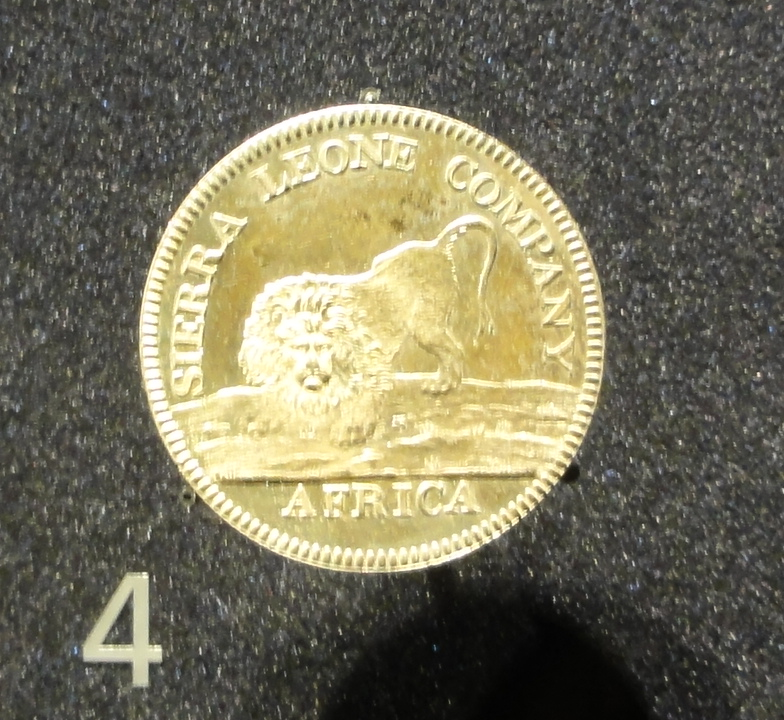
Sierra Leonean dollar

The dollar was a currency issued in Sierra Leone between 1791 and 1805. It was subdivided into 100 cents and was issued by the Sierra Leone Company. The dollar was pegged to sterling at a rate of 1 dollar = 4 shillings 2 pence.

== Coins ==
In 1791, coins were issued in denominations of 1, 10, 20, 50 cents, 1 penny (2 cents) and 1 dollar. The 1 cent and 1 penny were minted in bronze, the rest in silver. All the coins featured a lion on the obverse and two shaking hands, one white, one black, on the reverse.
