= Flag of Libya =

State of Libya
- Use: National flag, civil and state ensign
- Proportion: 1:2
- Adopted: 24 December 1951; 74 years ago 23 August 2011; 15 years ago (Battle of Tripoli)
- Relinquished: 1 September 1969; 57 years ago (military coup)
- Design: A horizontal triband of red, black (double width) and green; charged with a white crescent and five-pointed star centered on the black stripe.
- Designed by: Omar Faiek Shennib
- Use: Naval ensign
- Proportion: 2:3
- Design: A cerulean ensign with the Libyan Flag in the canton, and a white anchor in the fly side.

The national flag of Libya (Arabic: علم ليبيا) was originally introduced in 1951, following the creation of the Kingdom of Libya. It was designed by Omar Faiek Shennib and approved by King Idris Al Senussi who comprised the UN delegation representing the three regions of Cyrenaica, Fezzan, and Tripolitania at UN unification discussions.

The flag was abolished following the fall of the Kingdom in 1969, and the leader Muammar al-Gaddafi had implemented a few other different flags since then, but it was ultimately readopted by the National Transitional Council following the fall of Gaddafi on 3 August 2011.

The flag consists of a triband red-black-green design, the central black band being twice the width of the outer bands. A white star and crescent is located in the center of the flag.

== History ==
Royal Standard of Idris I (1951–1969)

The first Libyan flag design was based on the banner of the Senussi dynasty from Cyrenaica, which consisted of a black field and star and crescent design, and was later used as the flag of the region.

Omar Faiek Shennib, Chief of the Royal Diwans, Vice President of the National Assembly and Minister of Defense under King Idris Al Senussi is credited in the memoirs of Adrian Pelt, UN commissioner for Libya (1949 to 1951) for the design of the original flag of Libya. According to Pelt: "during deliberations of the Libyan National Constitutional Convention, a paper drawing of a proposed national flag was presented to the convention by Omar Faiek Shennib (distinguished member of the delegation from Cyrenaica). The design was composed of three colours: red, black and green, with a white crescent and star centered in the middle black stripe. Mr. Shennib informed the delegates that this design had met the approval of His Highness Emir of Cyrenaica, King Idris Al Senussi (later to become King of Libya). The assembly subsequently approved that design."

This flag represented Libya from its independence in 1951 until the 1969 Libyan coup d'état. The symbolism of the star and crescent in the flag of the Kingdom of Libya was explained in an English language booklet, The Libyan Flag & The National Anthem, issued by the Ministry of Information and Guidance of the Kingdom of Libya (year unknown) as follows: "The crescent is symbolic of the beginning of the lunar month according to the Islamic calendar. It brings back to our minds the story of Hijra [migration] of our Prophet Mohammed from his home in order to spread Islam and teach the principles of right and virtue. The Star represents our smiling hope, the beauty of aim and object and the light of our belief in God, in our country, its dignity and honour which illuminate our way and puts an end to darkness."

During the Libyan Civil War, design without the star and crescent was common on homemade flags

Another variant also used by rebels during the Libyan Civil War, with the three stripes of the same size

In 2011, interviews with Ibtisam Shennib and Amal Omar Shennib, Omar Faeik Shennib's only two remaining children, were cited as confirming Pelt's account of the origin of the flag. Ibtisam Shennib recalled the morning her father brought a draft of the flag to the breakfast table and showed it to her and her siblings, explaining the original intent behind the selection of the flag's colours and symbols. According to Omar Faiek Shennib, "red was selected for the blood sacrificed for the freedom of Libya, black to remember the dark days that Libyans lived under the occupation of the Italians and green to represent its primary wealth, agriculture, [Libya once being referred to as the 'agricultural basket' or 'breadbasket' of the Ottoman Empire] and the future prosperity of the country. The star and crescent were placed within the black central strip of the flag as a reference to the Senussi flag and the role of King Idris in leading the country to independence". The flag's colours also echo the colours of the flags of the three regions of Libya: Fezzan (red), Cyrenaica (black), and Tripolitania (green).

Under Muammar Gaddafi's leadership, Libya had a red-white-black flag from 1969 to 1977, and it was replaced by the all-green flag from 1977 to 2011, during which it was the only national flag in the world to have one colour and no design (except for a brief period from 1996–1997, when Afghanistan used an all-white national flag).

During the Libyan Civil War against the rule of Muammar Gaddafi, the 1951–1969 flag – as well as various makeshift versions without the crescent and star symbol, or with the three stripes of the same size – came back into use in areas held by the Libyan opposition and by protesters at several Libyan diplomatic missions abroad. The National Transitional Council, formed on 27 February 2011, adopted the flag previously used in the Kingdom of Libya between 1951 and 1969 as the "emblem of the Libyan Republic". The flag was officially defined in article three of the Libyan Draft Constitutional Charter for the Transitional Stage:

The national flag shall have the following shape and dimensions:

Its length shall be double its width, its shall be divided into three parallel coloured stripes, the uppermost being red, the centre black and lowest green, the black stripe shall be equal in area to the other two stripes together and shall bear in its centre a white crescent, between the two extremities of which there shall be a five-pointed white star.

On 10 March 2011, France was the first country to recognise the council as the official government of Libya, as well as the first to allow the Libyan embassy staff to raise the flag. On 21 March, the flag was flown by the Permanent Mission of Libya to the United Nations and appeared on their official website, and thereafter in late August by the Arab League and by Libya's own telecommunications authority, the Libya Telecom & Technology, on its own website. In the following months many other Libyan embassies replaced the green flag of Gaddafi with the tricolour flag.

This original flag of Libya is now the only flag used by the United Nations to represent Libya, according to the following UN statement: "Following the adoption by the General Assembly of resolution 66/1, the Permanent Mission of Libya to the United Nations formally notified the United Nations of a Declaration by the National Transitional Council of 3 August 2011 changing the official name of the Libyan Arab Jamahiriya to 'Libya' as well as a decision to change Libya's national flag to the original." All Libyan diplomatic posts, such as embassies and consulates, use the original flag of Libya.

== Legal basis and construction ==
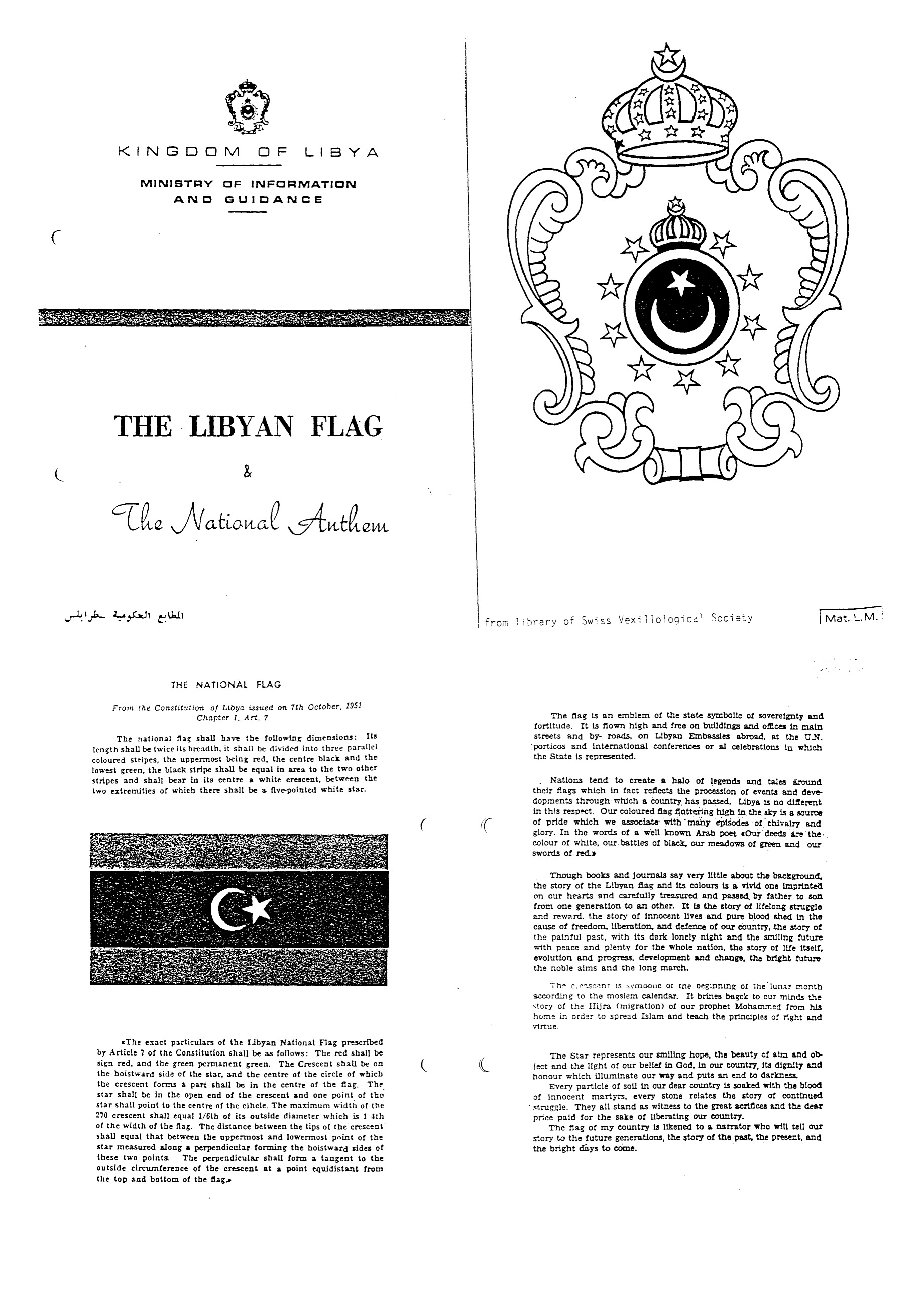
The Libyan Flag & The National Anthem, English-language booklet issued by the Ministry of Information and Guidance of the Kingdom of Libya (year unknown, copy kept by the library of Swiss Vexillological Society)

The flag of Libya is described in Article 7 of the Constitution of 7 October 1951. It was officially adopted on 24 December 1951. The passage from the constitution reads:

Chapter 1, Article 7: The national flag shall have the following dimensions: Its length shall be twice its breadth, it shall be divided into three parallel coloured stripes, the uppermost being red, the centre black and the lowest green, the black stripe shall be equal in area to the two other stripes combined and shall bear in its centre a white crescent, between the two extremities of which there shall be a five-pointed white star.

Both the precise shade and legal construction is described in a booklet issued by the Ministry of Information and Guidance of the Kingdom of Libya in 1951. The passage reads:

The exact particulars of the Libyan National Flag prescribed by Article 7 of the Constitution shall be as follows: The red shall be sign red, and the green permanent green. The Crescent shall be on the hoistward side of the star, and the centre of the circle of which the crescent forms a part shall be in the centre of the flag. The star shall be in the open end of the crescent and one point of the star shall point to the centre of the circle. The maximum width of the 270 crescent shall equal 1/6 of its outside diameter which is 1/4 of the width of the flag. The distance between the tips of the crescent shall equal that between the uppermost and lowermost point of the star measured along a perpendicular forming the hoistward sides of these two points. The perpendicular shall form a tangent to the outside circumference of the crescent at a point equidistant from the top and bottom of the flag.

Construction sheet

=== Colour scheme ===
Libya	Red	White	Green	Black
RGB	231/0/19	255/255/255	35/158/70	0/0/0
Hexadecimal	#e70013	#FFFFFF	#239e46	#000000
CMYK	0/100/92/9	0/0/0/0	78/0/56/38	0/0/0/100

== Other flags ==
Libyan National Army

Libyan Army

Libyan Navy

Libyan Air Force

Libyan Air Defense Forces

Libyan National Army (Variant)

== Historical flags ==
Flag	Date	Government	Notes
	1864–1911	Ottoman Tripolitania	The name "Libya" was re-introduced during colonisation by Italy in 1934. Before 1911, the Ottoman vilayet of Tripolitania (the "Kingdom of Tripoli") included much of the same territory as modern Libya.
	1911–1943	Italian Libya	After the Italo-Turkish War (1911-1912), Italy established the two colonies of Italian Tripolitania and Cyrenaica, which merged into Italian Libya in 1934. They all used the flag of Italy.
	1943–1951	British Military Administration	The areas of Libya under British military administration (Cyrenaica 1943–1949 and Tripolitania 1943–1951) did not have their own flag and thus used the Union Flag of the United Kingdom.
	1943–1951	Military Territory of Fezzan-Ghadames	During the French Administration of the former Southern Military Territory, Fezzan-Ghadames, did not have their own flag and thus used the flag of France.
	1949–1951	Emirate of Cyrenaica	During World War II, Italian Libya was occupied by France and the United Kingdom. The Cyrenaica Emirate was declared in British-occupied Cyrenaica in 1949 with the backing of the British authorities. The "Emir of Cyrenaica", Idris of Libya, kept the emirate's flag which derives from the flag of Turkey (a white crescent and star on a black background) as his personal flag after he became king of Libya in 1951.
	1951–1969, 2011–present	Kingdom of Libya / State of Libya	Originally called the United Kingdom of Libya, it came into existence upon independence on 24 December 1951 and lasted until a coup d'état led by Muammar Gaddafi on 1 September 1969 overthrew King Idris. Its flag was a triband of red, black and green with a crescent moon and star.
	1969–1972	Libyan Arab Republic	Following the coup d'état of 1969, the flag was replaced by the Pan-Arab red-white-black tricolour of the Arab Liberation Flag, first flown after the Egyptian Revolution of 1952 (which also formed the basis of the flags of Egypt, Iraq and Yemen).
	1974	Arab Islamic Republic	A failed attempt in 1974 by Muammar Gaddafi to merge the Libyan Arab Republic with Tunisia planned to use this flag.
	1972–1977	Federation of Arab Republics	In 1972 when Libya joined the Federation of Arab Republics its flag was adopted by the country, linking it to Egypt and Syria. It featured a golden hawk (the "Hawk of Quraish"), holding a scroll with the Arabic name of the Federation. The flags of Libya from 1951 to 1972 and since 1977 uses the 2:1 ratio, the 1972–1977 flag is the only Libyan flag that uses the 3:2 ratio for the first time.
	1972–1977	Federation of Arab Republics	Naval ensign of Libya.
	1977–2011	Great Socialist People's Libyan Arab Jamahiriya	The flag of the Libyan Arab Jamahiriya was adopted on 19 November 1977 and consisted of a simple green field. From 1977–1996, and again from 1997–2011 (Note: Afghanistan's flag from 1996-1997 was just a white field, after the Taliban took over.), it was the only national flag in the world with only one colour. It was chosen by Libyan leader Muammar Gaddafi to symbolise his political philosophy (after his Green Book). The green colour traditionally symbolises Islam, reflecting the historical green banners of the Fatimid Caliphate. In Libya, green was also a colour traditionally used to represent the Tripolitania region. This flag continues to be used by Gaddafi loyalists.
	1977–2011	Great Socialist People's Libyan Arab Jamahiriya	Similar but 2:3 ratio.
	1977–2011	Great Socialist People's Libyan Arab Jamahiriya	Naval ensign of Libya.

== See also ==
- List of Libyan flags
- National Emblem of Libya
- National Anthem of Libya
