= List of Libyan flags =

This is a List of Flags used in Libya. for more information about the national flag, see the Flag of Libya.

== National flag ==
Flag	Date	Use	Description
	2011–present	National flag of Libya	A horizontal triband of red, black (double width), and green; charged with a white crescent and five-pointed star centred on the black stripe.

== Military flags ==
Flag	Date	Use	Description
Current
	2011–present	Naval jack of Libya	A light blue field with the flag of Libya in the canton and defaced with a vertical white anchor.
	2011–present	Flag of the Libyan Army	A red field with the emblem in the center.
	2011–present	Flag of the Libyan Navy	A blue field with the emblem in the center.
	2011–present	Flag of the Libyan Air Force	A cyan field with the emblem in the center.
		Flag of the Libyan Air Defense Forces	A diagonally divided field with the emblem in the center. The upper hoist triangle is blue and the lower fly triangle is brown.
	2014–present	Flag of the Libyan National Army (variant)	A white field with the emblem in the center.
Former
	1977–2011	Naval jack of Libya	A light blue field with the Libyan green banner in the canton and defaced with a vertical white anchor.
	1972–1977	Naval jack of Libya	
	2014 – c. 2020	Flag of the Libyan National Army	A red field with the golden emblem in the center.

== Historical flags ==
=== Independence ===
Flag	Date	Use	Description
	1977–2011	Flag of the Great Socialist People's Libyan Arab Jamahiriya	A plain green flag – the colour represents Islamic faith and the nation's agricultural industry.
	1977–2011	Flag of the Great Socialist People's Libyan Arab Jamahiriya	Similar but 2:3 ratio.
	1974	Flag of the Arab Islamic Republic	A horizontal tricolour of red, white, and black with a red crescent moon and five-pointed star in the center.
	1972–1977	Flag of the Federation of Arab Republics	A horizontal tricolour of red, white, and black with a golden eagle in the center.
	1969–1972	Flag of the Libyan Arab Republic	A horizontal tricolour of red, white, and black.
	1951–1969	Flag of the Kingdom of Libya	A horizontal triband of red, black (double width), and green; charged with a white crescent and five-pointed star centred on the black stripe.

=== Emirate of Cyrenaica ===
Flag	Date	Use	Description
	1949–1951	Flag of the Emirate of Cyrenaica	A black field with a white crescent moon and a five-pointed star.

=== Fezzan-Ghadames Military Territory ===
Flag	Date	Use	Description
	1943–1951	Flag of France under the Fezzan-Ghadames Military Territory	Three equal vertical bands, each taking up one-third of the flag's length.

=== British Military Administration of Libya ===
Flag	Date	Use	Description
	1943–1951	Flag of the United Kingdom under the British Military Administration of Libya	A bold, upright red cross centered vertically and horizontally, bordered in white (fimbriated) to separate the red from the blue background.

=== Itaian Libya ===
Flag	Date	Use	Description
	1911–1943	Flag of the Italian Libya	Three equal vertical stripes of green (at the hoist), white (center), and red (fly) set in a 2:3 height-to-length proportion.

=== Ottoman Tripolitania ===
Flag	Date	Use	Description
	Before 1793	Flag of Ottoman Tripolitania	A simple red flag with a gray crescent.
	After 1793	Flag of Ottoman Tripolitania before the Karamanli takeover	A simple red flag with a white crescent and eight-pointed star.
	1864–1911	Flag of Ottoman Tripolitania under the Karamanli dynasty	A green flag with three crescents.
	1711–???	Another flag of Ottoman Tripolitania	A white background with two thin horizontal bars on both the top and bottom parts of the flag with one thicker thin red bar in the middle.
	18th century	Another flag of Ottoman Tripolitania	The same order of colors as the above flag, but with equal bands of each color – red, green, white, red, white, green, and red.
	1551–1911	Flag of Ottoman Tripolitania after Ottoman reassertion of power in the region	A simple red flag with a white crescent and five-pointed star.

== See also ==
- Flag of Libya
- Coat of arms of Libya
