= Decolonisation of Africa =

Independence of African colonies from European powers

Order of independence of African nations between 1950 and 2011

The decolonisation of Africa was a series of political developments in Africa between the mid-1950s to 1976, during the Cold War. (Note: This article discusses decolonisation from 1950 to 1976. As of 2026, Western Sahara is still designated by the United Nations as a non-self-governing territory undergoing decolonisation. It has yet to achieve full independence and in academic literature, it is often called "Africa's last colony".) Colonial governments formed during the Scramble for Africa collapsed, giving way to sovereign states in a process characterised by violence, political upheaval, civil unrest, and organised revolts. Major events during the decolonisation of Africa include the Mau Mau rebellion, the Algerian War, the Congo Crisis, the Angolan War of Independence, the Zanzibar Revolution, and the events leading to the Nigerian Civil War.

== Background ==
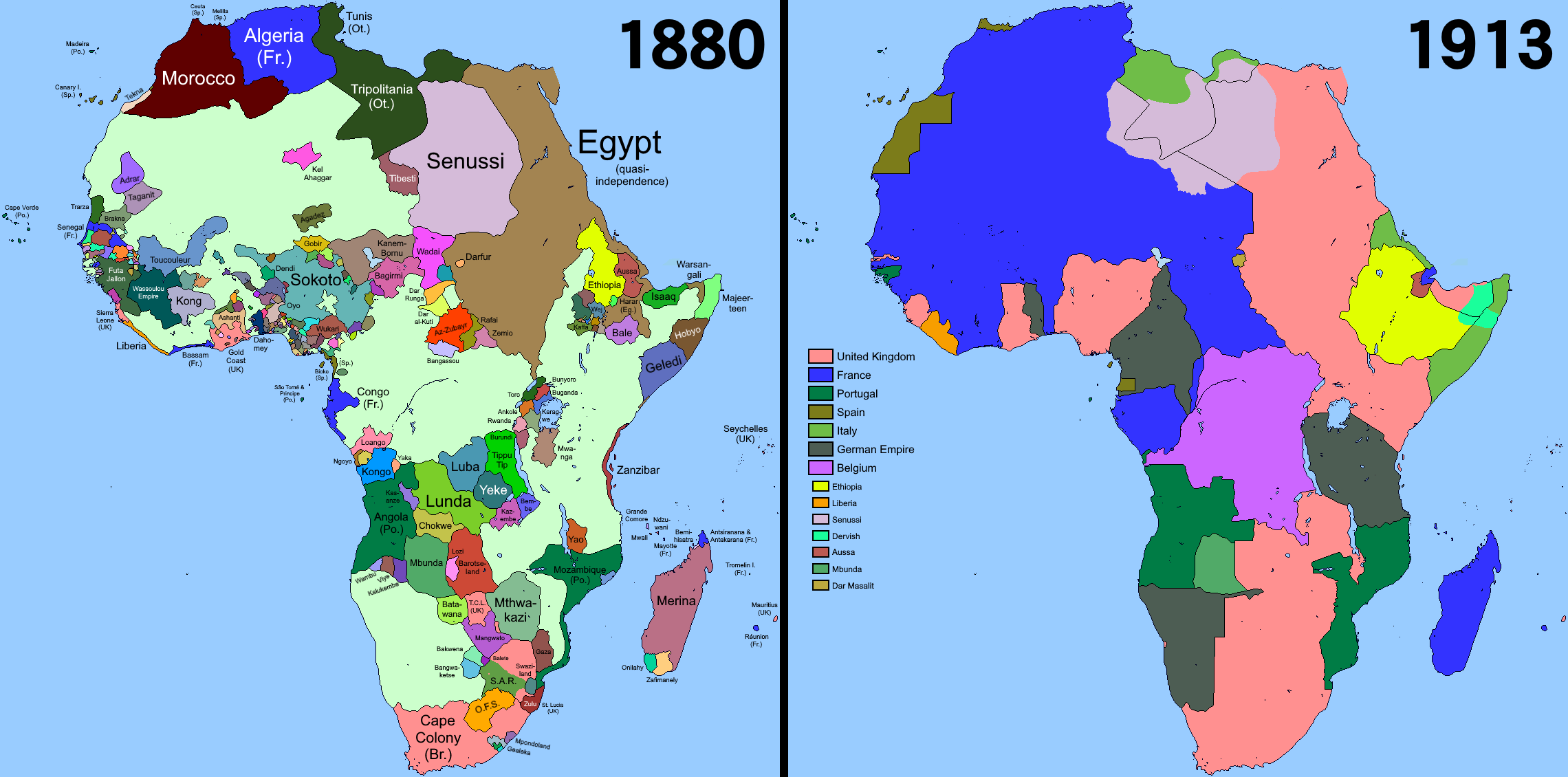
Scramble for Africa: Africa in the years 1880 and 1913, just before World War I

The Scramble for Africa between 1870 and 1914 was a significant period of European imperialism in Africa that ended with almost all of Africa, and its natural resources, claimed as colonies by European powers, who raced to secure as much land as possible while avoiding conflict amongst themselves. The partition of Africa was confirmed at the Berlin Conference of 1885, without regard for the existing political and social structures.

Almost all the precolonial states of Africa lost their sovereignty with the exceptions of Liberia and the Ethiopian Empire. Liberia had been settled in the early 19th century by formerly enslaved African-Americans and was recognised as independent by the United States in 1862 but was viewed by European powers as being in the United States' sphere of influence, while the Ethiopian Empire won its independence at the Battle of Adwa but was later occupied by Italy in 1936. Britain and France had the largest holdings, but Germany, Spain, Italy, Belgium, and Portugal also had colonies.

By 1977, 50 African countries had gained independence from European colonial powers.

=== External causes ===
European colonies in Africa in 1939, the year World War II began

In the early 20th century, nationalism gained ground globally. Following the end of World War I, German, Austro-Hungarian and Ottoman Empires according to the principles espoused in Woodrow Wilson's Fourteen Points. Though many anti-colonial intellectuals saw the potential of Wilsonianism to advance their aims, Wilson had no intention of applying the principle of self-determination outside the lands of the defeated Central Powers. The independence demands of Egyptian and Tunisian leaders, which would have compromised the interests of the victorious Allies, were not entertained. Though Wilsonian ideals did not endure as the interwar order broke down, the principle of an international order based on the self-determination of peoples remained relevant.

After 1919, anti-colonial leaders increasingly oriented themselves toward the Soviet Union's proletarian internationalism.

Many Africans fought in both World War I and World War II. In World War I, African labour was essential on the Western Front, and African soldiers fought in the Sinai and Palestine campaign. Many Africans were not allowed to bear arms or serve on an equal basis with whites. The sinking of the SS Mendi in 1917 was a particularly tragic incident for Africans in the war, with 607 of the 646 crew killed being Black South Africans. In the Second World War, Africans fought in both the European and Asian theatres of war.

Approximately one million sub-Saharan Africans served in European armies in some capacity. Many Africans were compelled or even forced into military service by their respective colonial regimes, but some voluntarily enlisted in search of better opportunities than they could find in civilian employment. This led to a deeper political awareness and the expectation of greater respect and self-determination, which went largely unfulfilled. Because the victorious allied powers had no intention of withdrawing from their colonial holdings at the end of the war, and would instead need to rely on the resources and manpower of their African colonies during postwar reconstruction in Europe, the colonial powers downplayed Africans' contributions to the allied victory.

On 12 February 1941, United States President Franklin D. Roosevelt and British Prime Minister Winston Churchill met to discuss the post-World War II world. The result was the Atlantic Charter. It was not a treaty and was not submitted to the Parliament of the United Kingdom or the United States Senate for ratification, but it turned out to be a widely acclaimed document. Clause Three referred to the right to decide what form of government people wanted, and to the restoration of self-government.

Prime Minister Churchill argued in the British Parliament that the document referred to "the States and nations of Europe now under the Nazi yoke". President Roosevelt regarded it as applicable across the world. Anticolonial politicians immediately saw it as relevant to colonial empires.

In 1948, three years after the end of World War II, the Universal Declaration of Human Rights recognised all people as being born free and equal.

Italy, a colonial power, lost its African empire, Italian East Africa, Italian Ethiopia, Italian Eritrea, Italian Somalia and Italian Libya, as a result of World War II. Furthermore, colonies such as Nigeria, Senegal and Ghana pushed for self-governance as colonial powers were exhausted by war efforts.

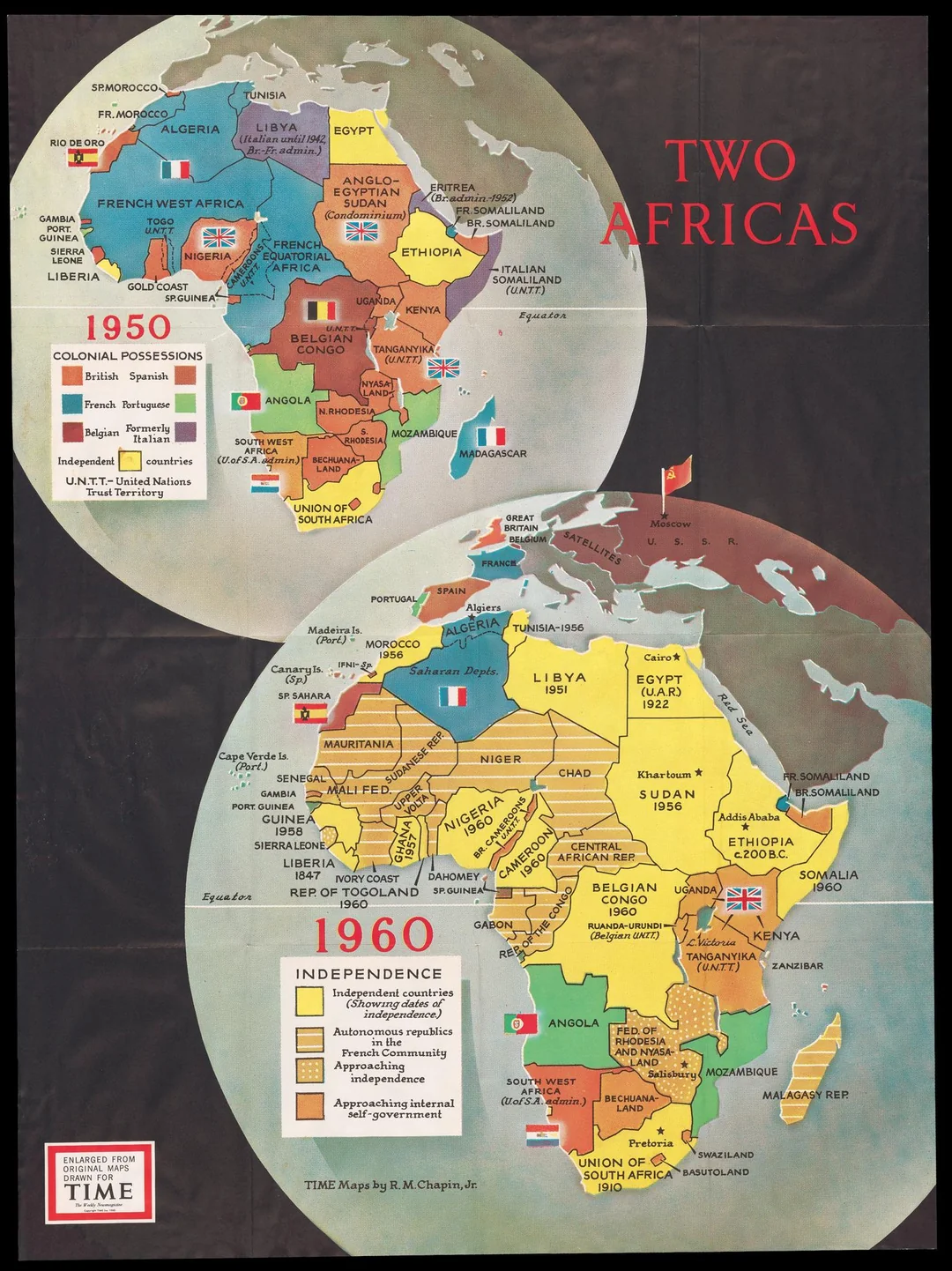
Comparison of 1950 Africa to 1960 Africa

The United Nations 1960 Declaration on the Granting of Independence to Colonial Countries and Peoples stated that colonial exploitation is a denial of human rights, and that power should be transferred back to the countries or territories concerned.

=== Internal causes ===
Colonial economic exploitation involved diverting resource extraction, such as mining, profits to European shareholders at the expense of internal development, causing significant local socioeconomic grievances. For early African nationalists, decolonisation was a moral imperative around which a political movement could be assembled.

In the 1930s, colonial powers cultivated, sometimes inadvertently, a small elite of local African leaders educated in Western universities, where they became familiar with ideas such as self-determination. Although independence was not encouraged, arrangements between these leaders and the colonial powers developed, and such figures as Jomo Kenyatta (Kenya), Kwame Nkrumah (Gold Coast, now Ghana), Julius Nyerere (Tanganyika, now Tanzania), Léopold Sédar Senghor (Senegal), Nnamdi Azikiwe (Nigeria), Patrice Lumumba (DRC), António Agostinho Neto (Portuguese West Africa) now (Angola) and Félix Houphouët-Boigny (Ivory Coast) came to lead the struggles for African nationalism.

During World War II, some local African industries and towns expanded when U-boats patrolling the Atlantic Ocean impeded the shipping of raw materials to Europe.

Over time, urban communities, industries, and trade unions grew, improving literacy and education, and leading to the establishment of pro-independence newspapers.

By 1945, the Fifth Pan-African Congress demanded the end of colonialism, and delegates included future presidents of Ghana, Kenya, Malawi, and other nationalist activists.

== Transition to independence ==
Following World War II, rapid decolonisation swept across the continent of Africa as many territories gained their independence from European colonisation.

In August 1941, United States President Franklin D. Roosevelt and British Prime Minister Winston Churchill met to discuss their post-war goals. In that meeting, they agreed to the Atlantic Charter, which in part stipulated that they would, "respect the right of all peoples to choose the form of government under which they will live; and they wish to see sovereign rights and self-government restored to those who have been forcibly deprived of them". This agreement became the post-WWII stepping stone toward independence as nationalism grew throughout Africa.

Consumed by post-war debt, European powers could no longer afford to maintain control of their African colonies. This allowed African nationalists to negotiate decolonisation very quickly and with minimal casualties. Some territories, however, saw large death tolls as a result of their fight for independence.

Historian James Meriweather argues that American policy towards Africa was characterised by a middle road approach, which supported African independence but also reassured European colonial powers that their holdings would remain intact. Washington wanted the right type of African groups to lead newly independent states, in other words not communist and not especially democratic. Meriweather argues that nongovernmental organisations influenced American policy towards Africa. They pressured state governments and private institutions to disinvest from African nations not ruled by the majority population. These efforts also helped change American policy towards South Africa, as seen with the passage of the Comprehensive Anti-Apartheid Act of 1986.

African countries that have gained independence
Country (Note: Explanatory notes are added in cases where decolonisation was achieved jointly by multiple countries or where the current country is formed by the merger of previously decolonised countries. Although Ethiopia was administered as a colony in the aftermath of the Second Italo-Ethiopian War and was recognised by the international community as such at the time, it is not listed here as its brief period under Italian rule (which lasted for a little more than five years and ended with the return of the previous native government) is now usually seen as a military occupation.)	Colonial name	Colonial power (Note: Some territories changed hands multiple times, so only the last colonial power is mentioned in the list. In addition, the mandatory or trustee powers are mentioned for territories that were League of Nations mandates and United Nations trust territories.)	Independence date (Note: The dates of decolonisation for territories annexed by or integrated into previously decolonised independent countries are given in separate notes, as are dates when a Commonwealth realm abolished its monarchy.)	First head of state (Note: For countries that became independent either as a Commonwealth realm, a monarchy with a strong Prime Minister, or a parliamentary republic, the head of government is listed instead.)	Independence won through
Liberia	Colony of Liberia	United States (American Colonization Society)	26 July 1847 (Note: Liberia would later annex the Republic of Maryland, another settler colony made up of former African-American slaves, in 1857. Liberia would not be recognised by the United States until 5 February 1862.)	Joseph Jenkins Roberts (Note: Stephen Allen Benson was President on the date of the United States' recognition.); William Tubman	Liberian Declaration of Independence
Union of South Africa	Cape Colony; Colony of Natal; Orange River Colony; Transvaal Colony	United Kingdom	31 May 1910 (Note: The Union of South Africa was constituted through the South Africa Act entering into force on 31 May 1910. On 11 December 1931, it got increased self-governance powers through the Statute of Westminster which was followed by transformation into a republic after the 1960 referendum. Afterwards, South Africa was under apartheid until elections resulting from the negotiations to end apartheid in South Africa on 27 April 1994 when Nelson Mandela became president.)	Louis Botha	South Africa Act 1909; Remained under white minority rule until 1994.
Kingdom of Egypt	Sultanate of Egypt	United Kingdom	28 February 1922 (Note: On 28 February 1922 the British government issued the Unilateral Declaration of Egyptian Independence. Through this declaration, the British government unilaterally ended its protectorate over Egypt and granted it nominal independence except four "reserved" areas: foreign relations, communications, the military, and the Anglo-Egyptian Sudan. The Anglo-Egyptian treaty of 1936 reduced British involvement, but still was not welcomed by Egyptian nationalists, who wanted full independence from Britain, which was not achieved until 23 July 1952. The last British troops left Egypt after the Suez Crisis of 1956.)	Fuad I (Note: Although the leaders of the 1952 revolution (Mohamed Naguib and Gamal Abdel Nasser) became the de facto leaders of Egypt, neither would assume office until 17 September of that year when Naguib became Prime Minister, succeeding Aly Maher Pasha who was sworn in on the day of the revolution. Nasser would succeed Naguib as Prime Minister on 25 February 1954.)	1919 Egyptian revolution
Emirate of Cyrenaica	British Military Administration of Libya; Italian Libya	United Kingdom; Kingdom of Italy	1 March 1949	Idris	Unilateral declaration of Cyrenaican independence
Kingdom of Libya	British Military Administration of Libya; Fezzan-Ghadames Military Territory; Emirate of Cyrenaica; Italian Libya	United Kingdom; France; Kingdom of Italy	24 December 1951	Idris	United Nations General Assembly Resolution 289
Republic of Sudan	Anglo-Egyptian Sudan	United Kingdom (Note: Anglo-Egyptian Condominium Agreement of 1899, stated that Sudan should be jointly governed by Egypt and Britain, but with real power remaining in British hands.); Egypt	1 January 1956 (Note: Before Sudan even gained its independence, on 18 August 1955 the southern area of Sudan began fighting for greater autonomy. After the signing of the Addis Ababa Agreement on 28 February 1972, South Sudan was granted autonomous rule. On 5 June 1983, however, the Sudan government revoked this autonomous rule, igniting a new war for control of South Sudan. (The main non-government combatant of the Second Sudanese Civil War largely claimed to be fighting for a united, secular Sudan rather than South Sudan's independence.) On 9 July 2005, following the Comprehensive Peace Agreement signed on 9 January of that year, the Southern Sudan Autonomous Region was restored; exactly six years later, in the aftermath of the 9–15 January 2011 South Sudanese independence referendum, South Sudan became independent.)	Ismail al-Azhari (Note: Salva Kiir became President of South Sudan upon independence. Abel Alier was the first President of the High Executive Council of the Southern Sudan Autonomous Region, while John Garang became its President following its restoration.)	– (Note: Sudan's independence is indirectly linked to the Egyptian revolution of 1952, whose leaders eventually denounced Egypt's claim over Sudan. (This revocation would force the British to end the condominium.))
Kingdom of Tunisia	French protectorate of Tunisia	France	20 March 1956	Lamine Bey; Habib Bourguiba	– (Note: See Tunisian independence.)
Morocco	French Protectorate in Morocco; Tangier International Zone; Spanish protectorate in Morocco; Spanish West Africa; Ifni	France; Spanish State	2 March 1956 (Note: Cape Juby was ceded by Spain to Morocco on 2 April 1958. Ifni was returned from Spain to Morocco on 4 January 1969.); 7 April 1956; 10 April 1958; 4 January 1969; 14 November 1975; 27 February 1976	Mohammed V	Ifni War
Dominion of Ghana	Gold Coast; Northern Territories of the Gold Coast; British Togoland; Togoland	United Kingdom; German Empire	6 March 1957 (Note: The British Togoland mandate and trust territory was integrated into Gold Coast colony on 13 December 1956. On 1 July 1960 Ghana formally abolished its Commonwealth monarchy and became a republic.)	Kwame Nkrumah (Note: Originally as Prime Minister; became President upon the monarchy's abolition.)	1956 Gold Coast general election
Guinea	French West Africa	France	2 October 1958	Ahmed Sékou Touré	1958 Guinean constitutional referendum
Cameroon	Kamerun; French Cameroon; British Cameroon	German Empire; France; United Kingdom	4 March 1916; 1 January 1960 (Note: After the French Cameroun mandate and trust territory gained independence it was joined by part of the British Cameroons mandate and trust territory on 1 October 1961. The other part of British Cameroons joined Nigeria.); 1 October 1961	Karl Ebermaier; Ahmadou Ahidjo; John Ngu Foncha	– (Note: Minor armed insurgency from Union of the Peoples of Cameroon.)
Togo	French Togoland; Togoland	France; German Empire	27 April 1960	Sylvanus Olympio	–
Mali Federation	French West Africa; Mali Federation	France	20 June 1960 (Note: Senegal and French Sudan gained independence on 20 June 1960 as the Mali Federation, which dissolved a few months later into present-day Senegal and Mali.)	Modibo Keïta	–
Malagasy Republic	Malagasy Republic; French Madagascar	France	26 June 1960	Philibert Tsiranana	– (Note: The Malagasy Uprising was an earlier armed uprising that failed to gain independence from France.)
State of Somaliland	British Somaliland	United Kingdom	26 June 1960	Muhammad Haji Ibrahim Egal	–
First Congolese Republic	Belgian Congo	Belgium	30 June 1960	Joseph Kasa-Vubu	Belgo-Congolese Round Table Conference (Note: The Congo Crisis occurred after independence.)
Somali Republic	State of Somaliland; British Somaliland; British Military Administration in Somaliland; Trust Territory of Somaliland	United Kingdom; Italy	1 July 1960 (Note: The Trust Territory of Somaliland (former Italian Somaliland) united with the State of Somaliland (former British Somaliland) on 1 July 1960 to form the Somali Republic (Somalia).)	Aden Adde	–
Republic of Dahomey	Republic of Dahomey; Fort of São João Baptista de Ajudá; French West Africa	France; Portugal	1 August 1960; 31 July 1961	Hubert Maga	
Niger	Niger; French West Africa	France	3 August 1960	Hamani Diori	–
Upper Volta	Upper Volta; French West Africa	France	5 August 1960	Maurice Yaméogo	–
Ivory Coast	Ivory Coast; French West Africa	France	7 August 1960	Félix Houphouët-Boigny	–
Chad	Chad French Equatorial Africa	France	11–12 August 1960	François Tombalbaye	–
Central African Republic	Central African Republic French Equatorial Africa	France	13 August 1960	David Dacko	–
Republic of the Congo	Republic of the Congo French Equatorial Africa	France	14–15 August 1960	Fulbert Youlou	–
Gabon	Gabon French Equatorial Africa	France	16–17 August 1960	Léon M'ba	–
Federation of Nigeria	Federation of Nigeria; British Cameroon; Kamerun	United Kingdom; German Empire	1 October 1960; 1 June 1961; 1 October 1961 (Note: Part of the British Cameroons mandate and trust territory on 1 October 1961 joined Nigeria. The other part of British Cameroons joined the previously decolonised French Cameroun mandate and territory.)	Nnamdi Azikiwe	–
Mauritania	Mauritania; French West Africa	France	28 November 1958; 28 November 1960	Moktar Ould Daddah	–
Sierra Leone	Sierra Leone Colony and Protectorate	United Kingdom	27 April 1961	Milton Margai	–
Tanganyika (Note: After both gained independence Tanganyika and Zanzibar merged on 26 April 1964 as Tanzania.)	Tanganyika Territory	United Kingdom	9 December 1961	Julius Nyerere	–
Kingdom of Burundi	German East Africa; Ruanda-Urundi	German Empire; Belgium	1 July 1919; 1 July 1962	Mwambutsa IV of Burundi	–
Rwanda	German East Africa; Ruanda-Urundi	German Empire; Belgium	1 July 1919; 1 July 1962	Yuhi V Musinga; Grégoire Kayibanda	Rwandan Revolution
Algeria	French Algeria	France	5 July 1962	Ahmed Ben Bella (Note: Assumed office on 27 September 1962, as Prime Minister. From the date of independence to Ben Bella's inauguration, Abderrahmane Farès served as President of the Provisional Executive Council.)	Algerian War; Évian Accords
Uganda	Protectorate of Uganda	United Kingdom	9 October 1962	Milton Obote	–
Kenya	Kenya Colony	United Kingdom	12 December 1963 (Note: Abolished its commonwealth monarchy exactly one year later; Jamhuri Day ("Republic Day") is a celebration of both dates.)	Jomo Kenyatta	– (Note: The Mau Mau rebellion was an earlier armed uprising that failed to gain independence from the United Kingdom.)
Sultanate of Zanzibar	Sultanate of Zanzibar	United Kingdom	10 December 1963	Jamshid bin Abdullah	– (Note: The Sultanate of Zanzibar would later be overthrown within a month of sovereignty by the Zanzibar Revolution.)
Malawi	Nyasaland	United Kingdom	6 July 1964 (Note: Abolished its commonwealth monarchy exactly two years later.)	Hastings Banda	–
Zambia	Northern Rhodesia	United Kingdom	24 October 1964	Kenneth Kaunda	–
The Gambia	Gambia Colony and Protectorate	United Kingdom	18 February 1965 (Note: Abolished its commonwealth monarchy on 24 April 1970.)	Dawda Jawara	–
Rhodesia Zimbabwe	Southern Rhodesia	United Kingdom	11 November 1965 (As Rhodesia) (Note: Due to Rhodesia's unwillingness to accommodate the British government's request for black majority rule, the United Kingdom (along with the rest of the international community) refused to recognise the white-minority-led government. The former self-governing colony would not be recognised as an independent state until the aftermath of the Rhodesian Bush War, under the name Zimbabwe.); 18 April 1980 (As Zimbabwe)	Ian Smith; Robert Mugabe	Rhodesia's Unilateral Declaration of Independence; Lancaster House Agreement
Botswana	Bechuanaland Protectorate	United Kingdom	30 September 1960 – 1966 (Note: Botswana Day Holiday is the second day of the two-day celebration of Botswana's independence. The first day is also referred to as Botswana Day.)	Seretse Khama	–
Lesotho	Basutoland	United Kingdom	4 October 1966	Leabua Jonathan (Note: Moshoeshoe II became King upon independence.)	–
Mauritius	British Mauritius	United Kingdom	12 March 1968	Seewoosagur Ramgoolam	–
Swaziland	Swaziland	United Kingdom	6 September 1968	Sobhuza II	–
Equatorial Guinea	Spanish Guinea	Spanish State	12 October 1968	Francisco Macías Nguema	–
Guinea-Bissau	Portuguese Guinea	Portugal	24 September 1973; 10 September 1974 (recognised); 5 July 1975 (Note: Not celebrated as a holiday. The date 24 September 1973 (when the PAIGC formally declared Guinea's independence) is celebrated as Guinea-Bissau's date of independence.)	Luís Cabral; João Bernardo Vieira; Aristides Pereira; Pedro Pires	Guinea-Bissau War of Independence
People's Republic of Mozambique	Portuguese Mozambique	Portugal	25 June 1975	Samora Machel	Mozambican War of Independence
Cape Verde	Portuguese Cape Verde	Portugal	5 July 1975	Aristides Pereira (Note: Pedro Pires was sworn in as Prime Minister three days after independence.)	Guinea-Bissau War of Independence (Note: Although the fight for Cape Verdean independence was linked to the liberation movement occurring in Guinea-Bissau, the island country itself saw little fighting.)
State of the Comoros	Territory of the Comoros	France	6 July 1975	Ahmed Abdallah	1974 Comorian independence referendum
São Tomé and Príncipe	Portuguese São Tomé and Príncipe	Portugal	12 July 1975	Manuel Pinto da Costa	–
People's Republic of Angola	Portuguese Angola	Portugal	11 November 1975	Agostinho Neto	Angolan War of Independence
Seychelles	Crown Colony of the Seychelles	United Kingdom	29 June 1976	James Mancham	–
Djibouti	French Territory of the Afars and the Issas	France	27 June 1977	Hassan Gouled Aptidon	1977 Afars and Issas independence referendum
Sahrawi Arab Democratic Republic (Note: The Spanish colonial rule de facto terminated over the Western Sahara (then Spanish Sahara), when the territory was passed on to and partitioned between Mauritania and Morocco (which annexed the entire territory in 1979). The decolonisation of Western Sahara is still pending, while a declaration of independence has been proclaimed by the Sahrawi Arab Democratic Republic, which controls only a small portion east of the Moroccan Western Sahara Wall. The UN still considers Spain the legal administrating country of the whole territory, awaiting the outcome of the ongoing Manhasset negotiations and resulting election to be overseen by the United Nations Mission for the Referendum in Western Sahara. However, the de facto administrator is Morocco (see United Nations list of non-self-governing territories).)	Spanish Sahara; Moroccan-occupied Western Sahara; Western Tiris	Spanish State; Morocco; Mauritania	27 February 1976 independence not yet effected	El-Ouali Mustapha Sayed; Mohamed Abdelaziz	Western Sahara War; Western Sahara conflict
Namibia	South West Africa German South West Africa	South Africa German Empire	27 October 1966 (de jure); 21 March 1990	Sam Nujoma	U.N. Security Council Resolution 269 South African Border War
Eritrea	Italian Eritrea; Eritrea Province	Kingdom of Italy; Ethiopian Empire	15 September 1952 (Federated with Ethiopia); 24 May 1993 independence)	Isaias Afwerki	Eritrean War of Independence

== British Empire ==
The British Empire in 1959

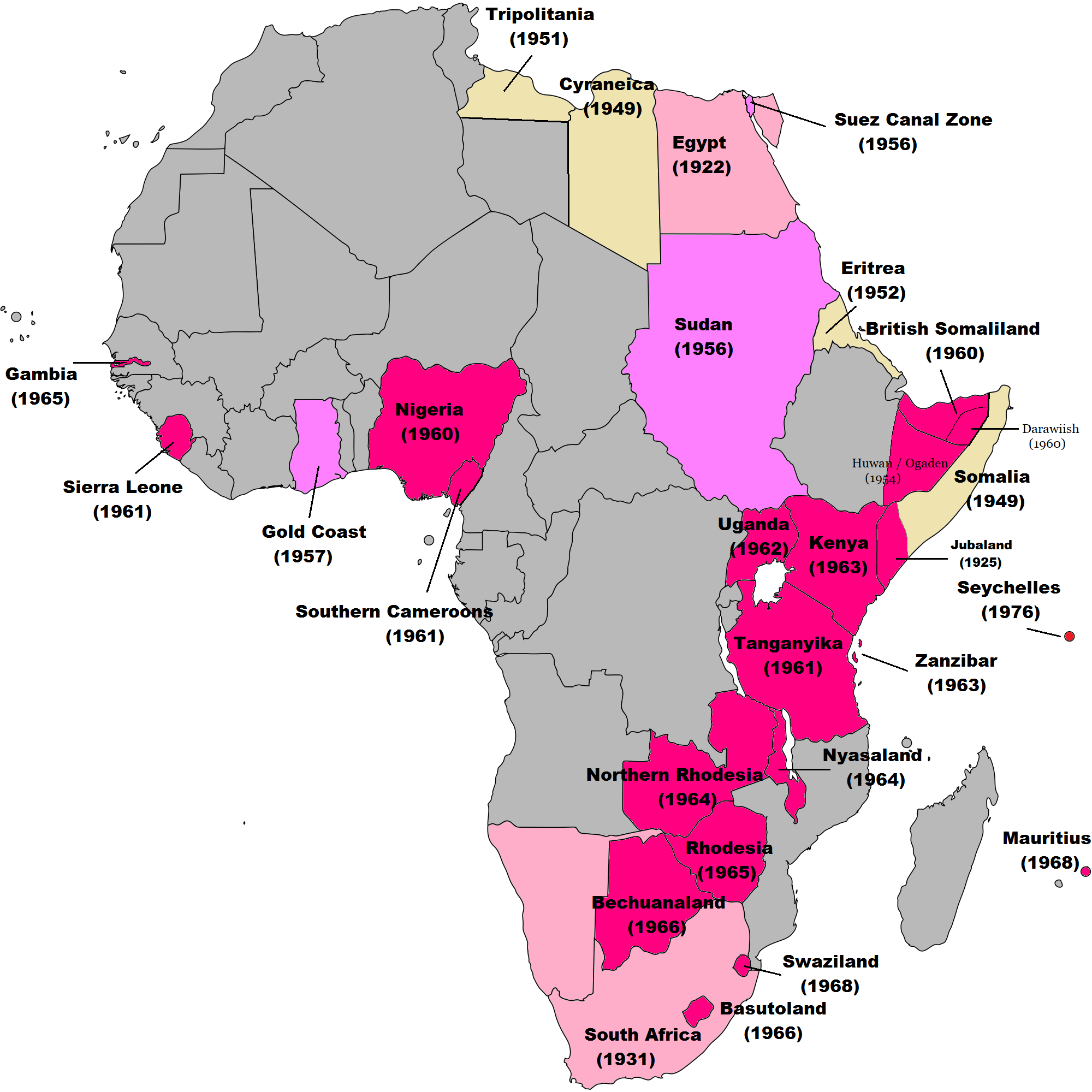
British decolonisation in Africa. By 1980, each British colony was decolonised.

=== Ghana ===
On 6 March 1957, Ghana (formerly the Gold Coast) became the first sub-Saharan African country to gain its independence from European colonisation. Starting with the 1945 Pan-African Congress, the Gold Coast's (modern-day Ghana's) independence leader Kwame Nkrumah made his focus clear. In the conference's declaration, he wrote, "We believe in the rights of all peoples to govern themselves. We affirm the right of all colonial peoples to control their own destiny. All colonies must be free from foreign imperialist control, whether political or economic."

In 1948, three Ghanaian veterans were killed by the colonial police on a protest march. Riots broke out in Accra and though Nkrumah and other Ghanaian leaders were temporarily imprisoned, the event became a catalyst for the independence movement. After being released from prison, Nkrumah founded the Convention People's Party (CPP), which launched a wide-scale campaign in support of independence with the slogan "Self Government Now!" Heightened nationalism within the country grew their power and the political party widely expanded.

In February 1951, the CPP gained political power by winning 34 of 38 elected seats, including one for Nkrumah who was imprisoned at the time. The British government revised the Gold Coast Constitution to give Ghanaians a majority in the legislature in 1951. In 1956, Ghana requested independence inside the Commonwealth, which was granted peacefully in 1957 with Nkrumah as prime minister and Queen Elizabeth II as sovereign.

=== Winds of Change ===
Prime Minister Harold Macmillan gave the famous "Wind of Change" speech in South Africa, in February 1960, where he spoke to the country's Parliament of "the wind of change blowing through this continent". Macmillan urgently wanted to avoid the same kind of colonial war that France was fighting in Algeria. Under his premiership, decolonisation proceeded rapidly.

Britain's remaining colonies in Africa, except for Southern Rhodesia, were all granted independence by 1968. British withdrawal from the southern and eastern parts of Africa was not a peaceful process. Kenyan independence was preceded by the eight-year Mau Mau rebellion. In Rhodesia, the 1965 Unilateral Declaration of Independence by the white minority resulted in a civil war that lasted until the Lancaster House Agreement of 1979, which set the terms for recognised independence in 1980, as the new nation of Zimbabwe.

Britain has moved to return its last British-occupied possession in Africa by signing a formal agreement in 2025 transferring sovereignty over the Chagos Islands to Mauritius. Under the terms of the agreement, the strategic atoll of Diego Garcia and its 38-kilometre buffer zone are immediately returned to Mauritius. This agreement allows for the continued operation of the joint Anglo-American base on Diego Garcia.

== Belgium ==
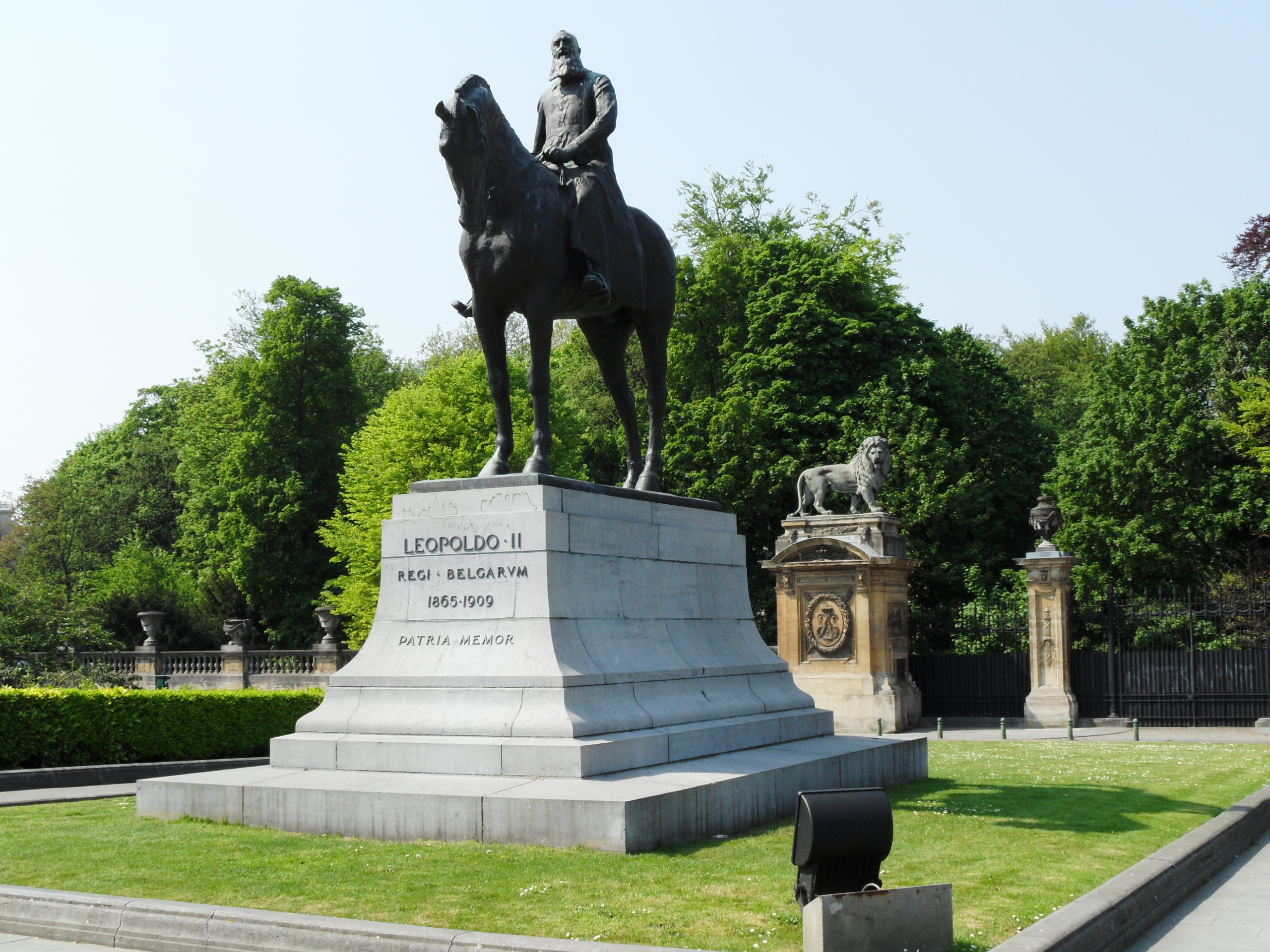
Equestrian statue of Leopold II of Belgium, the sovereign of the Congo Free State from 1885 to 1908, Regent Place in Brussels, Belgium

Belgium controlled several territories and concessions during the colonial era, principally the Belgian Congo (modern DRC) from 1908 to 1960 and Ruanda-Urundi (modern Rwanda and Burundi) from 1922 to 1962. It also had a small concession in China (1902–1931) and was a co-administrator of the Tangier International Zone in Morocco.

Roughly 98% of Belgium's overseas territory was just one colony, about 76 times larger than Belgium itself, known as the Belgian Congo. The colony was founded in 1908 following the transfer of sovereignty from the Congo Free State, which was the personal property of Belgium's king, Leopold II. The violence used by Free State officials against indigenous Congolese and the ruthless system of economic extraction had led to intense diplomatic pressure on Belgium to take official control of the country. Belgian rule in the Congo was based on the "colonial trinity" (trinité coloniale) of state, missionary and private company interests. During the 1940s and 1950s, the Congo experienced extensive urbanisation and the administration aimed to make it into a "model colony". As the result of a widespread and increasingly radical pro-independence movement, the Congo achieved independence, as the Republic of Congo-Léopoldville in 1960.

Of Belgium's other colonies, the most significant was Ruanda-Urundi, a portion of German East Africa, which was given to Belgium as a League of Nations mandate, when Germany lost all of its colonies at the end of World War I. After the Second World War and the establishment of the United Nations, Ruanda-Urundi became a United Nations trust territory which replaced the League of Nations mandate system. Following the Rwandan Revolution, the trusteeship became the independent states of the Republic of Rwanda and the Kingdom of Burundi in 1962.

== French colonial empire ==
The French Community in Africa in 1959

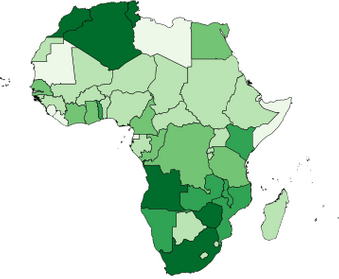
Geographic distribution of Europeans and their descendants on the African continent in 1962: Over 100,000

The French colonial empire began to fall during World War II when the Vichy France regime controlled the Empire. One after another, most of the colonies were occupied by foreign powers with Japan in Indochina, Britain in Syria, Lebanon, and Madagascar, the United States and Britain in Morocco and Algeria, and Germany and Italy in Tunisia. Control was gradually reestablished by Charles de Gaulle, who used the colonial bases as a launching point to help expel the Vichy government from Metropolitan France. De Gaulle, together with most Frenchmen, was committed to preserving the Empire in its new form. The French Union, included in the Constitution of 1946, nominally replaced the former colonial empire, but officials in Paris remained in full control. The colonies were given local assemblies with only limited local power and budgets. A group of elites, known as evolués, who were natives of the overseas territories but lived in metropolitan France emerged.

De Gaulle assembled a major conference of Free France colonies in Brazzaville, in central Africa, in January–February 1944. The survival of France depended on support from these colonies, and De Gaulle made numerous concessions. These included the end of forced labour, the end of special legal restrictions that applied to natives but not to whites, the establishment of elected territorial assemblies, representation in Paris in a new "French Federation", and the eventual representation of Sub-Saharan Africans in the French Assembly. However, Independence was explicitly rejected as a future possibility:

The ends of the civilizing work accomplished by France in the colonies excludes any idea of autonomy, all possibility of evolution outside the French bloc of the Empire; the eventual Constitution, even in the future of self-government in the colonies is denied.

=== Conflicts ===
After World War II ended, France was immediately confronted with the beginnings of the decolonisation movement. In Algeria demonstrations in May 1945 were repressed with an estimated 20,000-45,000 Algerians killed. Unrest in Haiphong, Indochina, in November 1945 was met by a warship bombarding the city. Paul Ramadier's (SFIO) cabinet repressed the Malagasy Uprising in Madagascar in 1947. French officials estimated the number of Malagasy killed from as low as 11,000 to a French Army estimate of 89,000.

In Cameroon, the Union of the Peoples of Cameroon's insurrection which began in 1955 headed by Ruben Um Nyobè, was violently repressed over two years, with perhaps as many as 100,000 people killed.

==== Algeria ====
French involvement in Algeria stretched back a century. Ferhat Abbas and Messali Hadj's movements marked the period between the two wars, but both sides radicalised after the Second World War. In 1945, the Sétif and Guelma massacre was carried out by the French army. The Algerian War started in 1954. Atrocities characterised both sides, and the number killed became highly controversial estimates that were made for propaganda purposes. Algeria was a three-way conflict due to the large number of "pieds-noirs" (Europeans who had settled there in the 125 years of French rule). The political crisis in France caused the collapse of the Fourth Republic, as Charles de Gaulle returned to power in 1958 and finally pulled the French soldiers and settlers out of Algeria by 1962. Lasting more than eight years, the estimated death toll typically falls between 300,000 and 400,000 people. By 1962, the National Liberation Front was able to negotiate a peace accord with de Gaulle, the Évian Accords in which Europeans would be able to return to their native countries, remain in Algeria as foreigners or take Algerian citizenship. Most of the one million Europeans in Algeria poured out of the country.

=== French Community ===
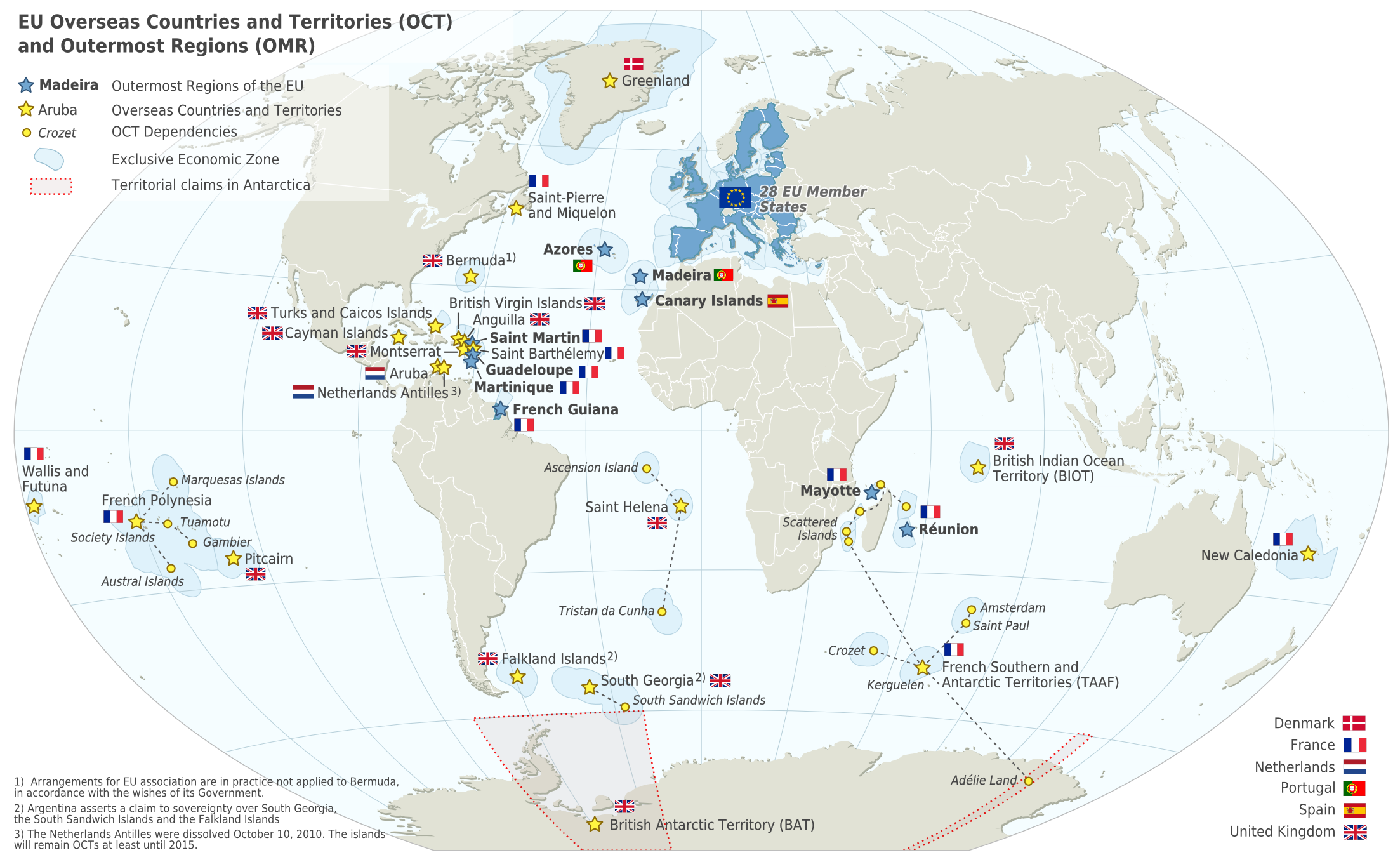
The special territories of the European Union, c. 2011

French conservatives were disillusioned with the colonial experience after the disasters in Indochina and Algeria. They wanted to cut all ties to the numerous colonies in French Sub-Saharan Africa. During the war, de Gaulle had successfully based his Free France movement and the African colonies. After a visit in 1958, he made a commitment to make sub-Saharan French Africa a major component of his foreign-policy. The French Union was replaced in the new Constitution of 1958 by the French Community. Only Guinea refused by referendum to take part in the new colonial organisation. However, the French Community dissolved itself amid the Algerian War; almost all of the other African colonies were granted independence in 1960, following local referendums. Some colonies chose instead to remain part of France, under the status of overseas départements (territories). Critics of neocolonialism claimed that the Françafrique had replaced formal direct rule. They argued that while de Gaulle was granting independence, on one hand, he was creating new ties with the help of Jacques Foccart, his counsellor for African matters. Foccart supported in particular the Nigerian Civil War during the late 1960s.

Robert Aldrich argues that with Algerian independence in 1962, it appeared that the Empire practically had come to an end, as the remaining colonies were quite small and lacked active nationalist movements. However, there was trouble in French Somaliland (Djibouti), which became independent in 1977. There also were complications and delays in the New Hebrides Vanuatu, which was the last to gain independence in 1980. New Caledonia remains a special case under French suzerainty. The Indian Ocean island of Mayotte voted in a referendum in 1974 to retain its link with France and forgo independence.

== Portugal ==
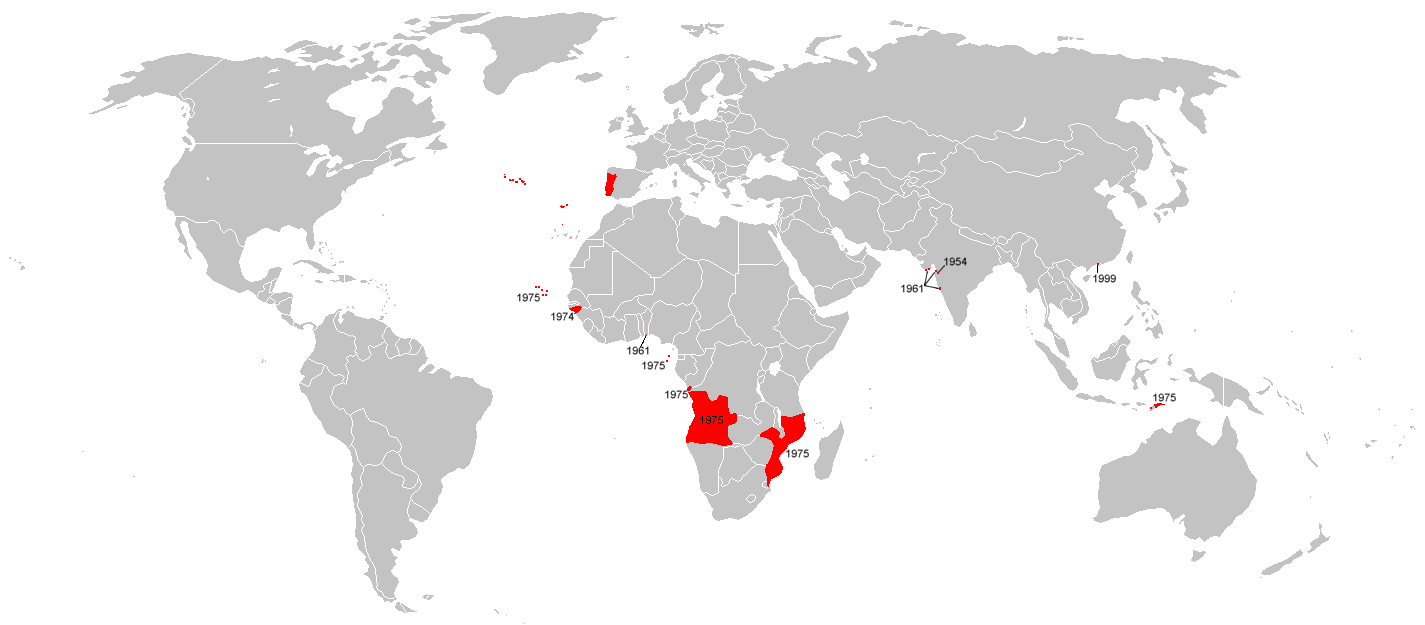
Portuguese Empire in the 20th century with dates of loss of colonies

Unlike other European nations during the 1950s and 1960s, the Portuguese Estado Novo regime did not withdraw from its African colonies. During the 1960s, various armed independence movements became active in Portuguese Africa. The Portuguese Colonial War, also known as the Angolan, Guinea-Bissau and Mozambican War of Independence, was a 13-year-long conflict fought between Portugal's military and the emerging nationalist movements in Portugal's African colonies between 1961 and 1974. The Portuguese regime at the time, the Estado Novo, was overthrown by a military coup in 1974, and the change in government brought the conflict to an end. From May 1974 to the end of the 1970s, over 500,000 Portuguese citizens from Portugal's African territories (mostly from Portuguese Angola and Mozambique) left those territories as refugees—the retornados.

== United States ==
=== Colony of Liberia ===
The Colony of Liberia, later the Commonwealth of Liberia, was a private colony of the American Colonization Society (ACS) beginning in 1822. It became an independent nation—the Republic of Liberia—after declaring independence in 1847.

Countries that have gained independence from United States
Country	Colonial name	Colonial power	Independence date	First head of state	Independence won through
Liberia	Liberia	United States (American Colonization Society)	26 July 1847	Joseph Jenkins Roberts	Liberian Declaration of Independence

== Acquisition of sovereignty ==
Country	Date of acquisition of sovereignty	Acquisition of sovereignty
Algeria	3 July 1962	French recognition of Algerian referendum on independence held two days earlier
Angola	11 November 1975	Independence from Portugal
Benin	1 August 1960	Independence from France
Botswana	30 September 1966	Independence from the United Kingdom
Burkina Faso	5 August 1960	Independence from France
Burundi	1 July 1962	Independence from Belgium
Cabo Verde	24 September 1973; 10 September 1974 (recognised); 5 July 1975 (Note: Not celebrated as a holiday. The date 24 September 1973 (when the PAIGC formally declared Guinea's independence) is celebrated as Guinea-Bissau's date of independence.)	Independence from Portugal
Cameroon	1 January 1960	Independence from France
Central African Republic	13 August 1960	Independence from France
Chad	11 August 1960	Independence from France
Comoros	6 July 1975	Independence from France declared
Democratic Republic of the Congo	30 June 1960	Independence from Belgium
Republic of Congo	15 August 1960	Independence from France
Djibouti	27 June 1977	Independence from France
Egypt	28 February 1922	The UK ends its protectorate, granting independence to Egypt
Equatorial Guinea	12 October 1968	Independence from Spain
Eritrea	1 June 1936; 5 May 1941; 19 May 1941; 10 February 1947; 19 February 1951; 15 September 1952	Abyssinian campaign, independence from Ethiopia declared
Eswatini	6 September 1968	Independence from the United Kingdom under the name Swaziland
Ethiopia	N/A	N/A
Gabon	17 August 1960	Independence from France
Gambia	18 February 1965	Independence from the United Kingdom
Ghana	6 March 1957	Independence from the United Kingdom
Guinea	2 October 1958	Independence from France
Guinea-Bissau	24 September 1973; 10 September 1974 (recognised); 5 July 1975 (Note: Not celebrated as a holiday. The date 24 September 1973 (when the PAIGC formally declared Guinea's independence) is celebrated as Guinea-Bissau's date of independence.)	Independence from Portugal declared
Ivory Coast	4 December 1958	Autonomous republic within French Community
Ivory Coast	7 August 1960	Independence from France
Kenya	12 December 1963	Independence from the United Kingdom
Lesotho	4 October 1966	Independence from the United Kingdom
Liberia	26 July 1847	Independence from American Colonization Society
Libya	24 December 1951	Independence from United Nations Trusteeship Council (British and French administration after Italian governance ends in 1947)
Madagascar	14 October 1958	The Malagasy Republic was created as autonomous state within French Community
Madagascar	26 June 1960	France recognises Madagascar's independence
Malawi	6 July 1964	Independence from the United Kingdom
Mali	25 November 1958	French Sudan gains autonomy
Mali	24 November 1958; 4 April 1959; 20 June 1960; 20 August 1960; 22 September 1960	Independence from France
Mauritania	28 November 1960	Independence from France
Mauritius	12 March 1968	Independence from the United Kingdom
Morocco	7 April 1956	Independence from France and Spain
Mozambique	25 June 1975	Independence from Portugal
Namibia	21 March 1990	Independence from South African rule
Niger	4 December 1958	Autonomy within French Community
Niger	23 July 1900; 13 October 1922; 13 October 1946; 26 July 1958; 20 May 1957; 25 February 1959; 25 August 1958; 3 August 1960; 8 November 1960; 10 November 1960	Independence from France
Nigeria	1 October 1960	Independence from the United Kingdom
Rwanda	1 July 1962	Independence from Belgium
São Tomé and Príncipe	12 July 1975	Independence from Portugal
Senegal	25 November 1957; 24 November 1958; 4 April 1959; 4 April 1960; 20 August 1960; 20 June 1960; 22 September 1960; 18 February 1965; 30 September 1989	Independence from France
Seychelles	29 June 1976	Independence from the United Kingdom
Sierra Leone	27 April 1961	Independence from the United Kingdom
Somalia	20 July 1887; 26 May 1925; 1 June 1936; 3 August 1940; 19 August 1940; 8 April 1941; 25 February 1941; 10 February 1947; 1 April 1950; 26 June 1960; 1 July 1960	Union of Trust Territory of Somaliland (former Italian Somaliland) and State of Somaliland (formerly British Somaliland)
South Africa	11 December 1931	Statute of Westminster, which establishes a status of legislative equality between the self-governing dominion of the Union of South Africa and the UK
South Africa	31 May 1910	Creation of the autonomous Union of South Africa from the previously separate colonies of the Cape, Natal, Transvaal and Orange River
South Sudan	9 July 2011	Independence from Sudan after a civil war.
Sudan	1 January 1956	Independence from Egyptian and British joint rule
Tanzania	9 December 1961	Independence of Tanganyika from the United Kingdom
Togo	30 August 1958	Autonomy within French Union
Togo	27 April 1960	Independence from France
Tunisia	20 March 1956	Independence from France
Uganda	1 March 1962	Self-government granted
Uganda	9 October 1962	Independence from the United Kingdom
Zambia	24 October 1964	Independence from the United Kingdom
Zimbabwe	11 November 1965	Unilateral declaration of independence by Southern Rhodesia
Zimbabwe	18 April 1980	Recognised independence from the United Kingdom as Zimbabwe

== Modern colonialism ==
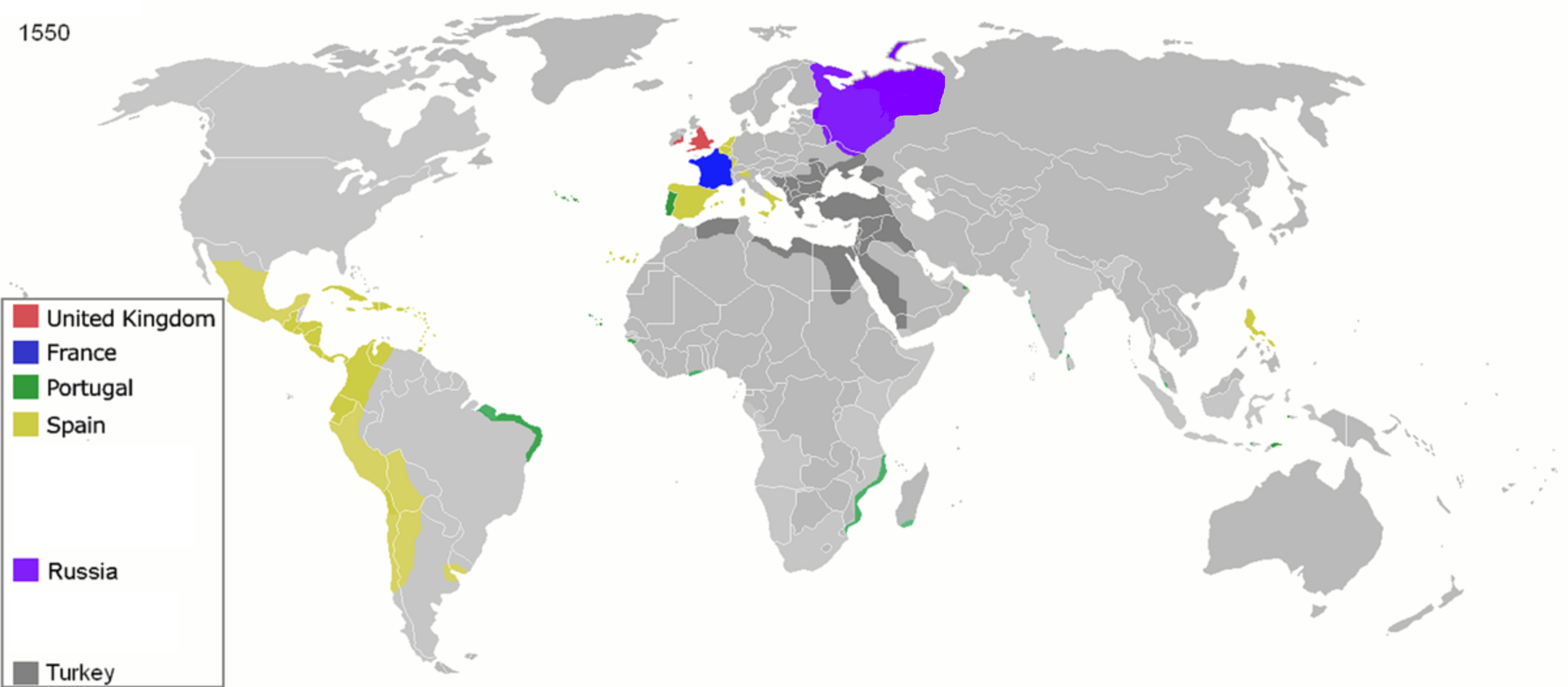
World empires and colonies in 1550

World empires and colonies in 1800

Colonialism in the colonial era, mostly refers to Western European countries' colonisation of lands in the Americas, Africa, Asia, and Oceania. The main European countries active in this form of colonisation included Spain, Portugal, France, the Tsardom of Russia (later Russian Empire and Soviet Union), the Kingdom of England (later Kingdom of Great Britain), the Kingdom of the Netherlands, Belgium and the Kingdom of Prussia (now mostly Germany), and, beginning in the 18th century, the United States. Most of these countries had a period of almost complete dominance of world trade at some stage in the period from roughly 1500 to 1900. Beginning in the late 19th century, the Empire of Japan also engaged in settler colonisation, most notably in Hokkaido and Korea.

While some European colonisation focused on shorter-term exploitation of economic opportunities (Newfoundland, for example, or Siberia) or addressed specific goals such as settlers seeking religious freedom (Massachusetts), at other times long-term social and economic planning was involved for both parties, but more on the colonising countries themselves, based on elaborate theory-building (note James Oglethorpe's Province of Georgia in the 1730s and Edward Gibbon Wakefield's New Zealand Company in the 1840s). In some cases European colonisation appeared to be primarily for long-term economic gain, as in the Congo where Joseph Conrad's Heart of Darkness described life under the rule of King Leopold II of Belgium in the 19th century and Siddharth Kara has described colonial rule and European and Chinese influence in the 20th and 21st centuries.

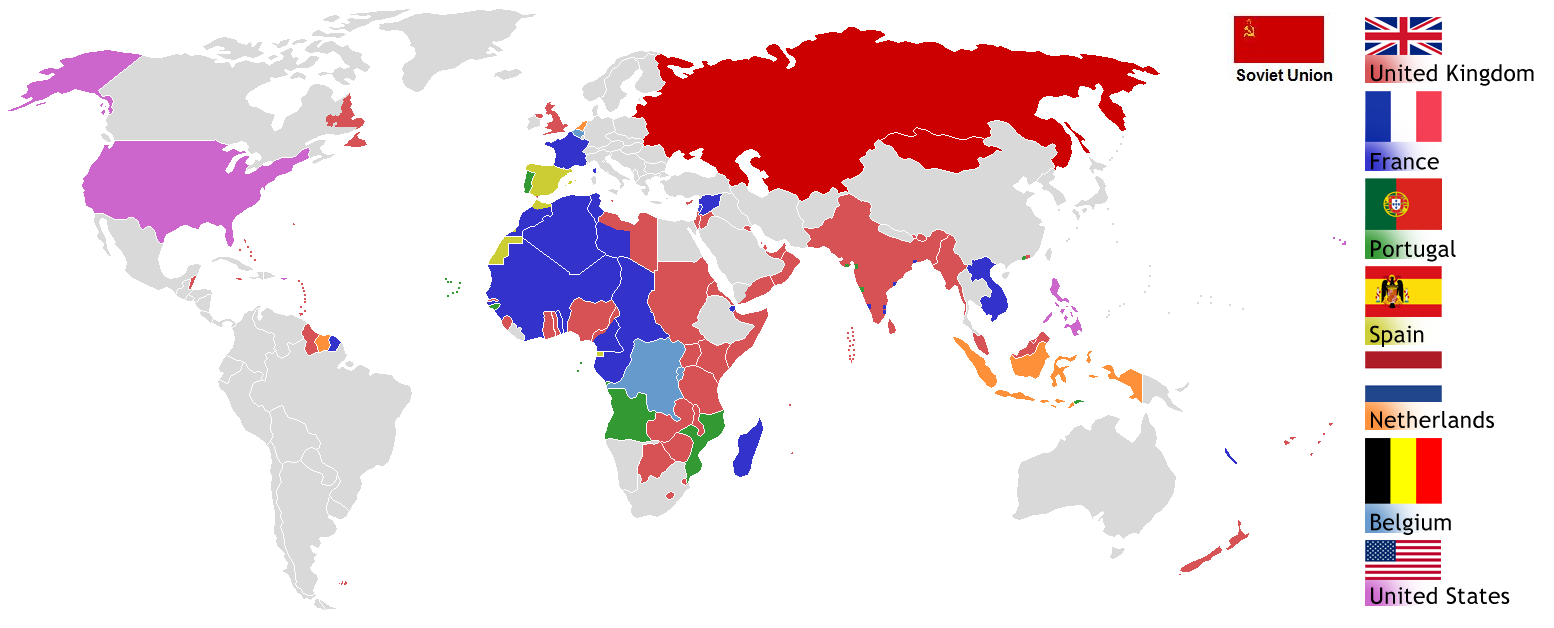
World empires and colonies in 1945

Colonisation may be used as a method of absorbing and assimilating foreign people into the culture of the imperial country. One instrument to this end is linguistic imperialism, or the use of non-indigenous colonial languages to the exclusion of any indigenous languages from administrative (and often, any public) use.

Many African independence movements took place in the 20th century, when a wave of struggles for independence in European-ruled African territories were witnessed. World War II (1939–1945) served as the catalyst for many of these movements, as it devastated both the colonial empires and their African territories. The colonial powers were distracted by the war against Nazi Germany, and thus had less time and resources devoted to their colonies, weakening their influence.

After WW2, Harry Truman and Winston Churchill introduced the Atlantic Charter, which declared that the United States and Britain would "respect the right of all peoples to choose the form of government under which they will live". The United Nations was also formed, and colonial powers were required to make annual reports on their territories, and it gave Africans a voice to list their grievances. The end of WW2 also saw the decline of Britain and France, and the rise of the United States and the USSR, which did not support colonial Europe's overseas territories.

Notable independence movements took place:

- Algeria (former French Algeria), see Algerian War
- Angola (former Portuguese Angola), see Portuguese Colonial War
- Guinea-Bissau (former Portuguese Guinea), see Portuguese Colonial War
- Madagascar (former French Madagascar), see Malagasy Uprising
- Mozambique (former Portuguese Mozambique), see Portuguese Colonial War
- Namibia (former South West Africa) against South Africa, see South African Border War

The flag of Algeria

=== French Algeria ===
==== Colonisation of Algeria ====
French colonisation of Algeria began on 14 June 1830, when French soldiers arrived in a coastal town, Sidi Ferruch. The troops did not encounter significant resistance, and within 3 weeks, the occupation was officially declared on 5 July 1830. After a year of occupation over 3,000 Europeans (mostly French) had arrived ready to start businesses and claim land. In reaction to the French occupation, Amir Abd Al-Qadir was elected leader of the resistance movement. On 27 November 1832, Abd Al-Qadir declared that he reluctantly accepted the position, but saw serving in the position as a necessity in order to protect the country from the enemy (the French). Abd Al-Qadir declared the war against the French as jihad, opposed to liberation. Abd Al-Qadir's movement was unique from other independence movements because the main call to action was for Islam rather than nationalism. Abd Al-Qadir fought the French for nearly two decades, but was defeated when the Tijaniyya Brotherhood agreed to submit to French rule as long as "they were allowed to exercise freely the rites of their religion, and the honor of their wives and daughters was respected". In 1847 Abd Al-Qadir was defeated and there were other resistance movements but none of them were as large nor as effective in comparison. Due to the lack of effective large-scale organising, Algerian Muslims "resorted to passive resistance or resignation, waiting for new opportunities", which came about from international political changes due to World War I.

As World War I began, officials discussed drafting young Algerians into the army to fight for the French, but there was some opposition. European settlers were worried that if Algerians served in the army, then those same Algerians would want rewards for their service and claim political rights (Alghailani). Despite the opposition, the French government drafted young Algerians into the French army for World War I. Since many Algerians had fought as French soldiers during World War I, just as the European settlers had suspected, Muslim Algerians wanted political rights after serving in the war. Muslim Algerians felt it was all the more unfair that their votes were not equal to the other Algerians (the settler population) especially after 1947 when the Algerian Assembly was created. This assembly was composed of 120 members. Muslim Algerians who represented about 9 million people could designate 50% of the Assembly members while 900,000 non-Muslim Algerians could designate the other half.

==== Religion in Algeria ====
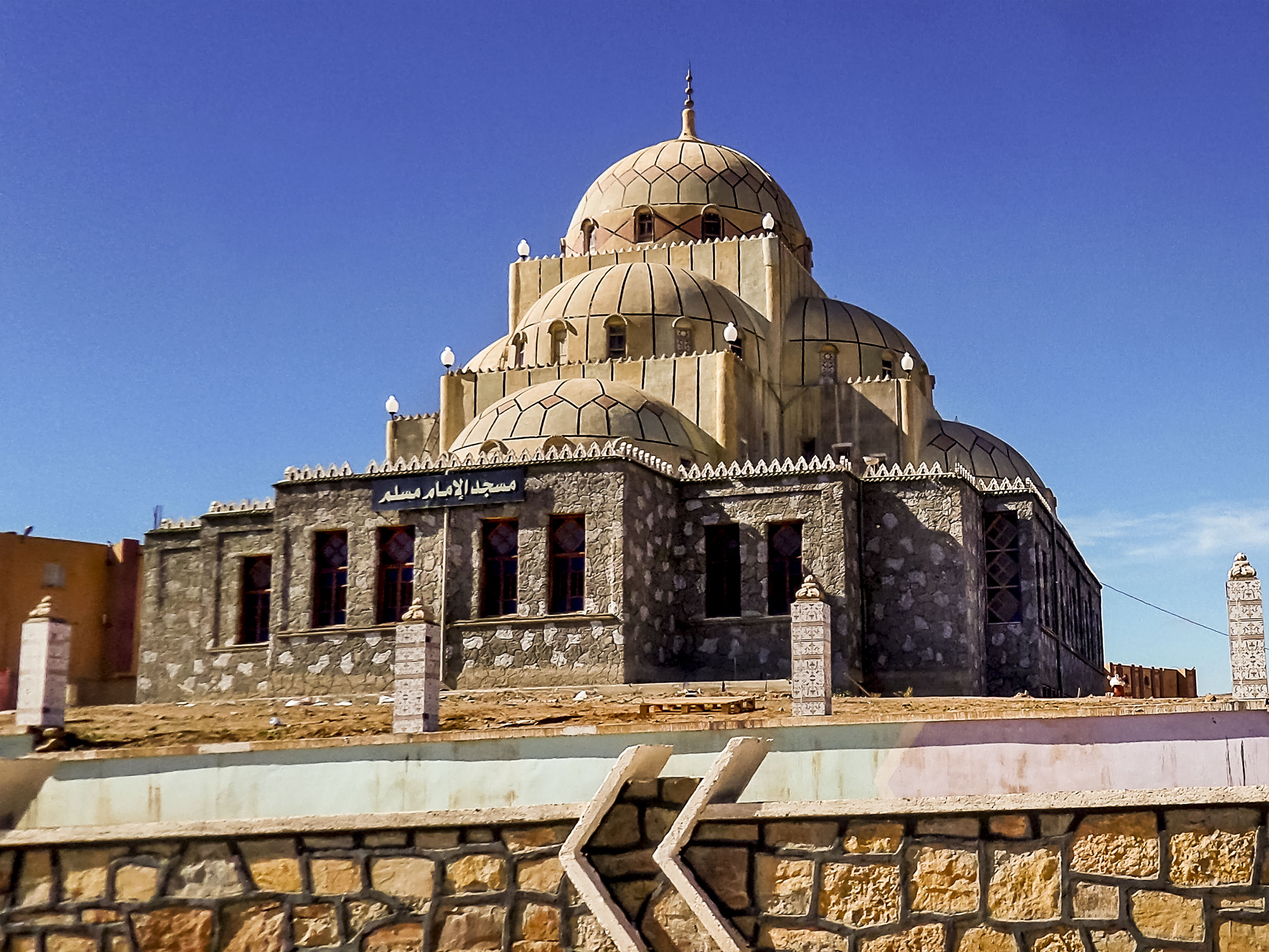
A Muslim mosque in Algeria

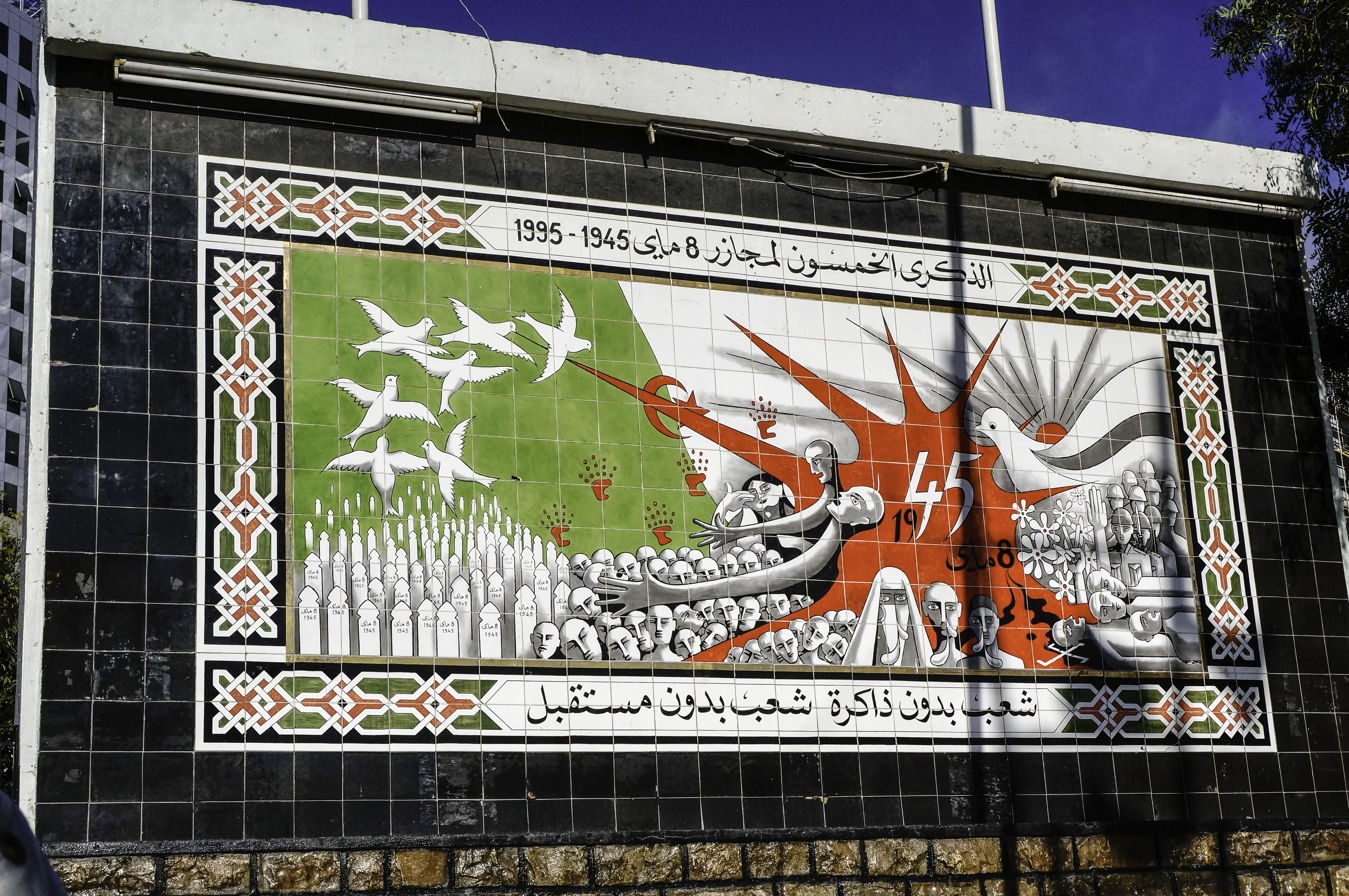
Monument to those killed in the first independence protest, the Sétif and Guelma massacre

When the French arrived in Algeria in 1830, they quickly took control of all Muslim establishments. The French took the land in order to transfer wealth and power to the new French settlers. In addition to taking property relating Muslim establishments, the French also took individuals' property and by 1851, they had taken over 350,000 hectares of Algerian land. For many Algerians, Islam was the only way to escape the control of French Imperialism. In the 1920s and 30s, there was an Islamic revival led by the ulama, and this movement became the basis for opposition to French rule in Algeria. Ultimately, French colonial policy failed because the ulama, especially Ibn Badis, utilised the Islamic institutions to spread their ideas of revolution. For example, Ibn Badis used the "networks of schools, mosques, cultural clubs, and other institutions", to educate others, which ultimately made the revolution possible. Education became an even more effective tool for spreading their revolutionary ideals when Muslims became resistant to sending their children to French schools, especially their daughters. Ultimately, this led to conflict between the French and the Muslims because there were effectively two different societies within one country.

==== Leading up to the fight for independence ====
The fight for independence, or the Algerian war, began with a massacre that occurred on 8 May 1945 in Setif, Algeria. After WWII ended, nationalists in Algeria, in alignment with the American anti-colonial sentiment, organised marches, but these marches became bloody massacres. An estimated 6,000–45,000 Algerians were killed by the French army. This event triggered a radicalisation of Algerian nationalists and it was a crucial event in leading up to the Algerian War.

In response to the massacre, Messali Hadj, the leader of the independence party, the Movement for the Triumph of Democratic Liberties (MTLD), "turned to electoral politics. With Hadj's leadership, the party won multiple municipal offices. But, in the 1948 elections the candidates were arrested by Interior Minister Jules Moch. While the candidates were being arrested, the local authorities stuffed ballots for Muslim men, non-members of the independence party. Since the MTLD could not gain independence via elections, Hadj turned to violent means and consulted "the head of its parliamentary wing, Hocine A ̈ıt Ahmed, to advise on how the party might win Algeria's independence through force of arms." A ̈ıt Ahmed had never been formally trained in strategy, so he studied former rebellions against the French and he came to the conclusion that "no other anti-colonial movement had had to deal with such a sizable and politically powerful settler population." Due to the powerful settler population, A ̈ıt Ahmed believed that Algeria could only achieve independence if the movement became relevant in the international political arena. Over the next few years, members of the MTLD began to disagree about which direction the organisation should go to achieve independence, so eventually the more radical members broke off to form the National Liberation Front (FLN).

==== Fight for independence in the international arena ====
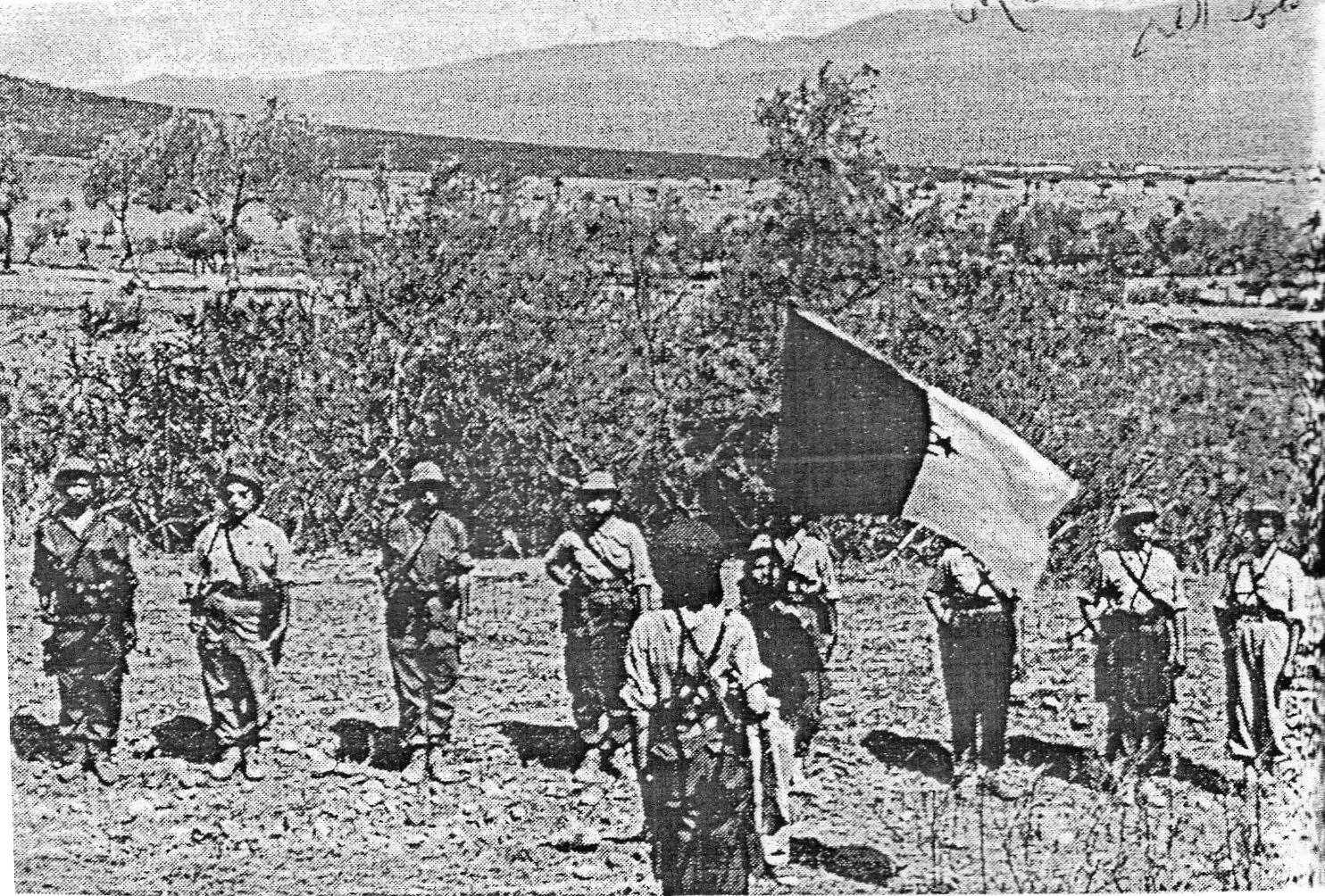
Algerian women in the Algerian War of Independence

The FLN officially started the Algerian War for Independence and followed A ̈ıt Ahmed's advice by creating tensions in the Franco-American relations. Due to the intensifying global relations, the Algerian War became a "kind of world war—a war for world opinion". In closed-door meetings the United States encouraged France to negotiate with the FLN, but during UN meetings the United States helped France end discussion on Algeria. Ultimately, the strategy of just focusing on superpowers was not successful for Algeria, but once A ̈ıt Ahmed began to exploit international rivalries the Algerian war for independence was successful.

==== Women in the fight for independence ====
Thousands of women took part in the war, even on deadly missions. Women took part as "combatants, spies, fundraisers, and couriers, as well as nurses, launderers, and cooks". 3% of all fighters were women, which is roughly equivalent to 11,000 women.

This is a quote of three women who participated in the war: "We had visited the site and noted several possible targets. We had been told to place two bombs, but we were three, and at the last moment, since it was possible, we decided to plant three bombs. Samia and I carried three bombs from the Casbah to Bab el Oued, where they were primed...Each of us placed a bomb, and at the appointed time there were two explosions; one of the bombs was defective and didn't go off.' – Djamila B., Zohra D., and Samia, Algiers, September 1956".

==== Outcome ====
Algeria gained independence on 20 February 1962 when the French government signed a peace accord. Peace in the country did not last long. Shortly after gaining independence, the Algerian Civil War began. The civil war erupted from anger regarding one party rule and ever increasing unemployment rates in Algeria. In October 1988, young Algerian men took to the streets and participated in week-long riots. In addition, the Algerian war for independence inspired liberationists in South Africa. However, the liberationists were unsuccessful in implementing Algerian strategy into their independence movement. The Algerian Independence movement also had a lasting impact on French thought about the relationship between the government and religion.

=== African nationalism in Portuguese Africa ===
Portugal built a five-century global empire, starting overseas expansion in the 15th century. Innovations such as the caravel, better navigation tools, and the school at Sagres under Prince Henry the Navigator gave the small Atlantic nation an early lead. Explorers reached islands like Madeira and the Azores, pushed down the African coasts, and arrived in Asia, including Japan, by the 16th century. Portugal established forts and colonies across Africa, including Cape Verde, São Tomé and Príncipe, and territory around the Congo River such as Cabinda, Luanda, and Benguela. On the southeast coast, they controlled ports like Mozambique, Quelimane, and Lourenço Marques until Arab rivals from Oman took northern territories.

Weaknesses soon emerged. Portugal's small population and limited popular support meant few settlers, and convict exiles were sent to places like Angola. African economies under Portuguese control became dependent on the Atlantic slave trade, especially to Brazil. Although slavery was outlawed in stages, ending in 1858, powerful interests delayed change. Political instability at home during and after the Napoleonic Wars hindered colonial governance. Meanwhile, the Industrial Revolution increased European demand for African resources. Britain, tied to Portugal through long diplomatic and economic relations, pushed for free-trade access and often dominated commerce in Portuguese territories. Growing European competition in the 19th century led to disputes over regions such as the Shire Highlands (modern Malawi) and over control around the Congo River. British challenges to vague Portuguese claims set precedents requiring effective occupation, a principle formalised at the Congress of Berlin in 1884–85.

After World War II, Portugal renamed its colonies "Overseas Provinces" and resisted decolonisation. Modernisation followed, particularly in Angola and Mozambique. In the 1960s, nationalist movements, supported by the Eastern Bloc and others, launched liberation struggles. The resulting conflicts in Angola, Guinea, and Mozambique became known as the Portuguese Colonial War.

==== Portuguese Angola ====
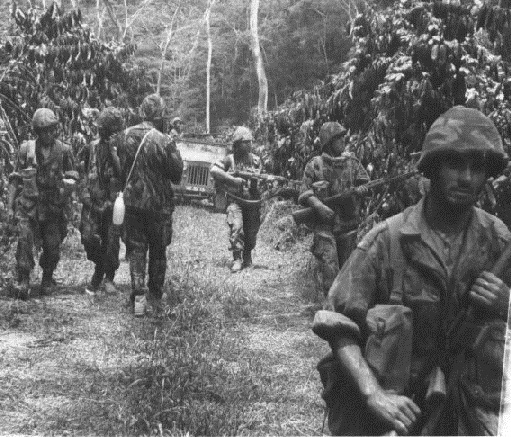
Portuguese soldiers in Angola

In Portuguese Angola, the rebellion of the ZSN was taken up by the União das Populações de Angola (UPA), which changed its name to the National Liberation Front of Angola (FNLA) in 1962. On 4 February 1961, the People's Movement for the Liberation of Angola (MPLA) took credit for the attack on the prison of Luanda, where seven policemen were killed. On 15 March 1961, the UPA, in a tribal attack, started the massacre of white populations and black workers born in other regions of Angola. This region would be retaken by large military operations that, however, would not stop the spread of the guerrilla actions to other regions of Angola, such as Cabinda, the east, the southeast and the central plateaus.

==== Portuguese Guinea ====
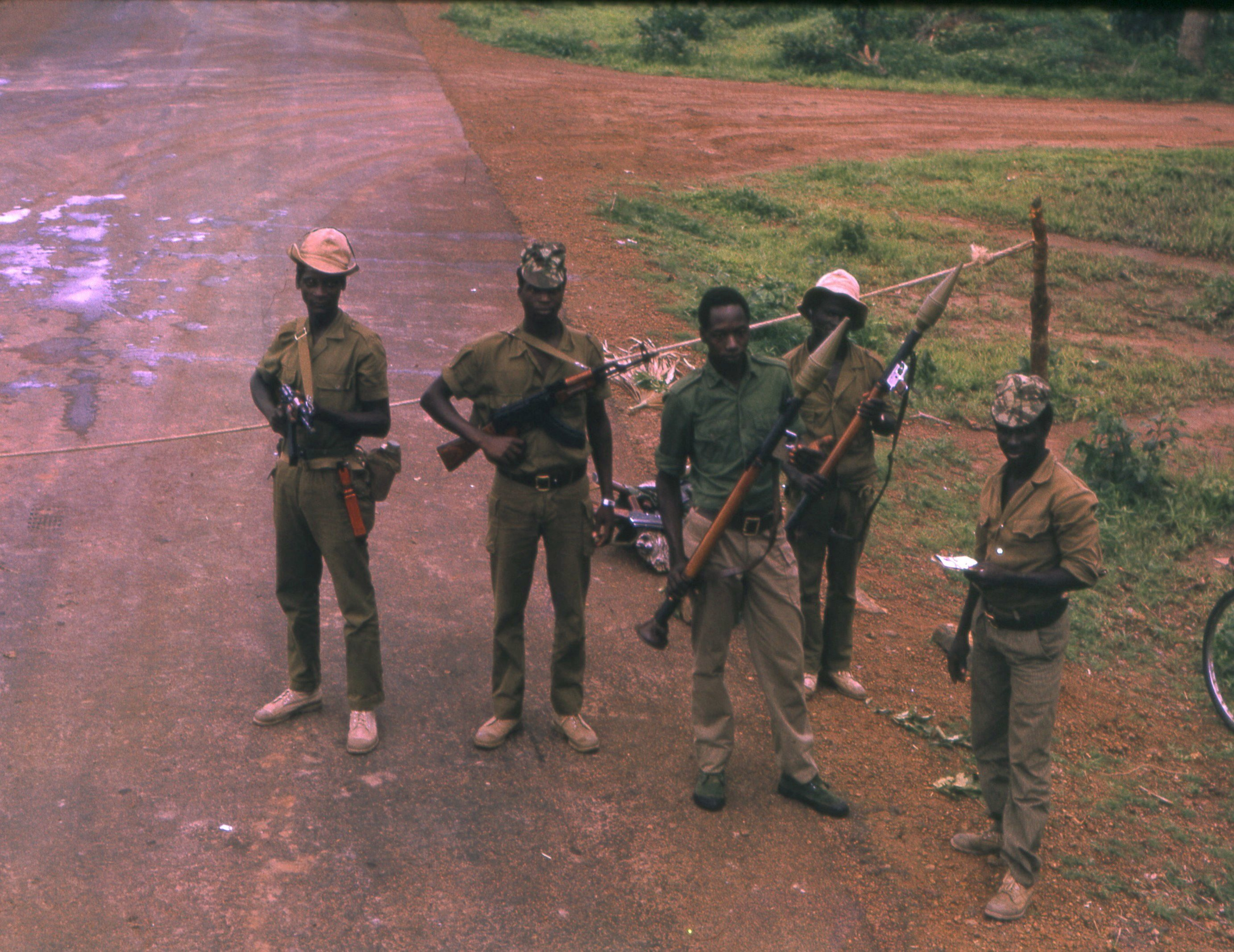
An African Party for the Independence of Guinea and Cape Verde (PAIGC) checkpoint in 1974

In Portuguese Guinea, the Marxist African Party for the Independence of Guinea and Cape Verde (PAIGC) started fighting in January 1963. Its guerrilla fighters attacked the Portuguese headquarters in Tite, located to the south of Bissau, the capital, near the Corubal River. Similar actions quickly spread across the entire colony, requiring a strong response from the Portuguese forces.

The war in Guinea placed face to face Amílcar Cabral, the leader of PAIGC, and António de Spínola, the Portuguese general responsible for the local military operations. In 1965 the war spread to the eastern part of the country and in that same year the PAIGC carried out attacks in the north of the country where at the time only the minor guerrilla movement, the Struggle Front for the National Independence of Guinea (FLING), was fighting. By that time, the PAIGC started receiving military support from the Socialist Bloc, mainly from Cuba, a support that would last until the end of the war.

In Guinea the Portuguese troops mainly took a defensive position, limiting themselves to keeping the territories they already held. This kind of action was particularly devastating to the Portuguese troops who were constantly attacked by the forces of the PAIGC. They were also demoralised by the steady growth of the influence of the liberation supporters among the population that was being recruited in large numbers by the PAIGC.

With some strategic changes by António Spínola in the late 1960s, the Portuguese forces gained momentum and, taking the offensive, became a much more effective force. Between 1968 and 1972, the Portuguese forces took control of the situation and sometimes carried attacks against the PAIGC positions. At this time the Portuguese forces were also adopting subversive means to counter the insurgents, attacking the political structure of the nationalist movement. This strategy culminated in the assassination of Amílcar Cabral in January 1973. Nonetheless, the PAIGC continued to fight back and pushed the Portuguese forces to the limit. This became even more visible after PAIGC received anti-aircraft weapons provided by the Soviets, especially the 9K32 Strela-2 rocket launchers, thus undermining the Portuguese air superiority.

==== Portuguese Mozambique ====
Portuguese Mozambique was the last territory to start the war of liberation. Its nationalist movement was led by the Marxist–Leninist Liberation Front of Mozambique (FRELIMO), which carried out the first attack against Portuguese targets on 24 September 1964, in Chai, province of Cabo Delgado. The fighting later spread to Niassa, Tete at the centre of the country. A report from Battalion No. 558 of the Portuguese army makes references to violent actions, also in Cabo Delgado, on 21 August 1964. On 16 November of the same year, the Portuguese troops suffered their first losses fighting in the north of the country, in the region of Xilama. By this time, the size of the guerrilla movement had substantially increased; this, along with the low numbers of Portuguese troops and colonists, allowed a steady increase in FRELIMO's strength. It quickly started moving south in the direction of Meponda and Mandimba, linking to Tete with the aid of Malawi.

Until 1967 the FRELIMO showed less interest in Tete region, putting its efforts on the two northernmost districts of the country where the use of landmines became very common. In the region of Niassa, FRELIMO's intention was to create a free corridor to Zambézia. Until April 1970, the military activity of FRELIMO increased steadily, mainly due to the strategic work of Samora Machel in the region of Cabo Delgado. In the early 1970s, after Portugal's Operation Gordian Knot, the nationalist guerrilla was severely damaged.

==== Role of the Organisation of African Unity ====
The Organisation of African Unity (OAU) was founded May 1963. Its basic principles were co-operation between African nations and solidarity between African peoples. Another important objective of the OAU was an end to all forms of colonialism in Africa. This became the major objective of the organisation in its first years and soon OAU pressure led to the situation in the Portuguese colonies being brought up at the United Nations Security Council.

The OAU established a committee based in Dar es Salaam, with representatives from Ethiopia, Algeria, Uganda, Egypt, Tanzania, Zaire, Guinea, Senegal and Nigeria, to support African liberation movements. The support provided by the committee included military training and weapon supplies. The OAU also took action in order to promote the international acknowledgement of the legitimacy of the Revolutionary Government of Angola in Exile (GRAE), composed of the National Liberation Front of Angola (FNLA). This support was transferred to the People's Movement for the Liberation of Angola (MPLA) and to its leader, Agostinho Neto in 1967. In November 1972, both movements were recognised by the OAU in order to promote their merger. After 1964, the OAU recognised PAIGC as the legitimate representatives of Guinea-Bissau and Cape Verde and in 1965 recognised FRELIMO for Mozambique.

=== Eritrea ===
Eritrea sits on a strategic location along the Red Sea between the Suez Canal and the Bab-el-Mandeb. Eritrea was an Italian colony from 1890 to 1941. On 1 April 1941, the British captured Asmara defeating the Italians and Eritrea fell under the British Military Administration. This military rule lasted from 1941 until 1952. On 2 December 1950, the United Nations General Assembly, by UN Resolution 390 A(V) federated Eritrea with Ethiopia. The architect of this federal act was the United States. The federation went into effect 11 September 1952. However, the federation was a non-starter for feudal Ethiopia, and it started to systematically undermine it. On 24 December 1958—the Eritrean flag was replaced by the Ethiopian flag; On 17 May 1960—The title "Government of Eritrea" of the Federation was changed to "Administration of Eritrea". Earlier Amharic was declared official language in Eritrea replacing Tigrinya and Arabic. Finally on 14 November 1962 -– Ethiopia officially annexed Eritrea as its 14th province.

The people of Eritrea, after finding out peaceful resistance against Ethiopia's rule was falling on deaf ears formed the Eritrean Liberation Movement in 1958. The founders of these independence movement were: Mohammad Said Nawud, Saleh Ahmed Iyay, Yasin al-Gade, Mohammad al-Hassen and Said Sabr. ELM members were organised in secret cells of seven. The movement was known as Mahber Shewate in Tigrinya and as Harakat Atahrir al Eritrea in Arabic. On 10 July 1960, a second independence movement, the Eritrean Liberation Front (ELF) was founded in Cairo. Among its founders were: Idris Mohammed Adem, President, Osman Salih Sabbe, Secretary General, and Idris Glawdewos as head of military affairs. These were among those who made up the highest political body known as the Supreme Council. On 1 September 1961, Hamid Idris Awate and his ELF unit attacked an Ethiopian police unit in western Eritrea (near Mt. Adal). This heralded the 30-year Eritrean war for independence. Between March and November 1970, three core groups that later made up the Eritrean People's Liberation Front (EPLF) split from the ELF and established themselves as separate units.

In September 1974, Emperor Haile Selassie was overthrown by a military coup in Ethiopia. The military committee that took power in Ethiopia is better known by its Amharic name the Derg. After the military coup the Derg broke ties with the U.S. and aligned with the Soviet Union, and the Soviet Union and its eastern bloc allies replaced the United States as patrons of Ethiopia's aggression against Eritrea. Between January and July 1977, the ELF and EPLF armies had liberated 95% of Eritrea, capturing all but 4 towns. However, in 1978–79, Ethiopia mounted a series of five massive Soviet-backed offensives and reoccupied almost all of Eritrea's major towns and cities, except for Nakfa. The EPLF withdrew to a mountain base in northern Eritrea, around the town of Nakfa. In 1980 the EPLF had offered a proposal for referendum to end the war, however, Ethiopia, thinking it had a military upper hand, rejected the offer and war continued. In February–June 1982, The EPLF managed to repulse Ethiopia's much heralded four-month "Red Star" campaign, also known as the 6th offensive by Eritreans, inflicting more than 31,000 Ethiopian casualties.

In 1984, the EPLF launched a counter-offensive and cleared the Ethiopian from the Northeastern Sahil front. In March 1988, the EPLF demolished the Ethiopian front at Afabet in a major offensive the British Historian Basil Davidson compared to the French defeat at Điện Biên Phủ. In February 1990, the EPLF liberated the strategic port of Massawa, and in the process destroyed a portion of the Ethiopian Navy. A year later, the war came to conclusion on 24 May 1991, when the Ethiopian army in Eritrea surrendered. Thus Eritrea's 30-year war crowned with victory.

On 24 May 1993, after a UN-supervised referendum on 23–25 April 1993, in which the Eritrean people overwhelmingly, 99.8%, voted for independence, Eritrea officially declared its independence and gained international recognition.

=== Namibia ===
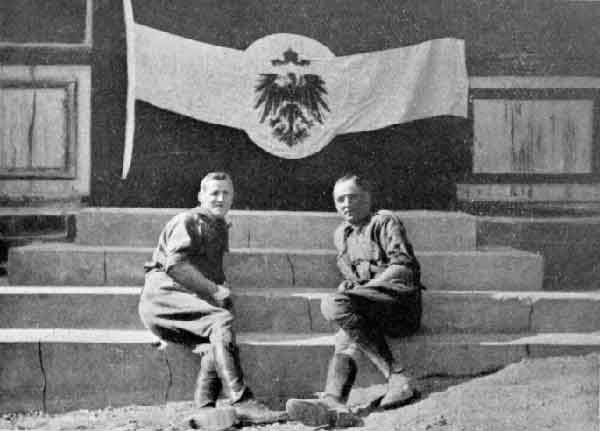
South African National Defence Force soldiers pose with a captured flag of Germany after their successful invasion of South West Africa in 1915.

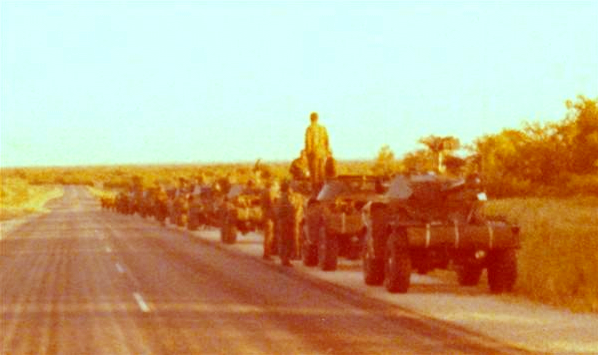
A South African military convoy in present-day Namibia in 1978

At the onset of World War I, the Union of South Africa participated in the invasion and occupation of several Allied territories taken from the German Empire, most notably German South West Africa and German East Africa in present-day Namibia and Tanzania respectively. Germany's defeat forced the new Weimar Republic to cede its overseas possessions to the League of Nations as mandates. A mandate over South-West Africa was conferred upon the United Kingdom, "for and on behalf of the government of the Union of South Africa", which was to handle administrative affairs under the supervision of the league. South-West Africa was classified as a "C" mandate, or a territory whose population sparseness, small size, remoteness, and geographic continuity to the mandatory power allowed it to be governed as an integral part of the mandatory itself. Nevertheless, the League of Nations obliged South Africa to promote social progress among indigenous inhabitants, refrain from establishing military bases there, and grant residence to missionaries of any nationality without restriction. Article 7 of the South-West Africa mandate stated that the consent of the league was required for any changes in the terms of the mandate.

With regards to the local German population, the occupation was on especially lenient terms; South Africa only repatriated civil and military officials, along with a small handful of political undesirables. Other German civilians were allowed to remain. In 1924 all white South-West Africans were automatically naturalised as South African nationals and British subjects thereof; the exception being about 260 who lodged specific objections. In 1926 a Legislative Assembly was created to represent German, Afrikaans, and English-speaking white residents. Control over basic administrative matters, including taxation, was surrendered to the new assembly, while matters pertaining to defence and native affairs remained in the hands of an administrator-general.

Following World War II, South West Africa's international status after the dissolution of the League of Nations was questioned. The United Nations General Assembly refused South Africa permission to incorporate the mandate as a fifth province, largely due to its controversial policy of racial apartheid. At the General Assembly's request the issue was examined at the International Court of Justice. The court ruled in 1950 that South Africa was not required to transfer the mandate to UN trusteeship, but remained obligated to adhere to its original terms, including the submission of annual reports on conditions in the territory.

Led by newly elected Afrikaner nationalist D. F. Malan, the South African government rejected this opinion and refused to recognise the competence of the UN to interfere with South-West African affairs. In 1960 Ethiopia and Liberia, the only two other former League of Nations member states in Africa, petitioned the Hague to rule in a binding decision that the league mandate was still in force and to hold South Africa responsible for failure to provide the highest material and moral welfare of black South West Africans. It was pointed out that nonwhite residents were subject to all the restrictive apartheid legislation affecting nonwhites in South Africa, including confinement to reserves, colour bars in employment, pass laws, and "influx control" over urban migrants. A South African attempt to scupper proceedings by arguing that the court had no jurisdiction to hear the case was rejected; conversely, however, the court itself ruled that Ethiopia and Liberia did not possess the necessary legal interest entitling them to bring the case.

In October 1966 the General Assembly declared that South Africa had failed to fulfil its obligations as the mandatory power and had in fact disavowed them. The mandate was unilaterally terminated on the grounds that the UN would now assume direct responsibility for South-West Africa. In 1967 and 1969 the UN called for South Africa's disengagement and requested the Security Council to take measures to oust the South African Defence Force from the territory that the General Assembly, at the request of black leaders in exile, had officially renamed Namibia. One of the greatest aggravating obstacles to eventual independence occurred when the UN also agreed to recognise the South West African People's Organization (SWAPO), then an almost exclusively Ovambo body, as the sole authentic representative of the Namibian population. South Africa was offended by the General Assembly's simultaneous dismissal of its various internal Namibian parties as puppets of the occupying power. Furthermore, SWAPO espoused a militant platform which called for independence through UN activity, including military intervention.

By 1965 SWAPO's morale had been elevated by the formation of a guerrilla wing, the People's Liberation Army of Namibia (PLAN), which forced the deployment of South African Police troops along the long and remote northern frontier. The first armed clashes between PLAN cadres and local security forces took place in August 1966.

== Legacy ==
An extensive body of literature has examined the legacy of colonialism and colonial institutions on economic outcomes in Africa, with numerous studies showing disputed economic effects. Modernisation theory posits that colonial powers built infrastructure to integrate Africa into the world economy; however, this was built mainly for extraction purposes. African economies were structured to benefit the coloniser and any surplus was likely to be 'drained', thereby stifling local capital accumulation. Dependency theory suggests that most African economies continued to occupy a subordinate position in the world economy after independence with a reliance on primary commodities such as copper in Zambia and tea in Kenya. Despite this continued reliance and unfair trading terms, a meta-analysis of 18 African countries found that a third of them experienced increased economic growth post-independence.

Scholars including Dellal (2013), Miraftab (2012) and Bamgbose (2011) have argued that Africa's linguistic diversity has been eroded. Language has been used by western colonial powers to divide territories and create new identities, which have led to conflicts and tensions between African nations. In the immediate post-independence period, African countries largely retained colonial legislation. However, by 2015 much colonial legislation had been replaced by laws that were written locally.

== See also ==
- History of Africa#Contemporary Africa (1935-present)
- Postcolonial Africa
- Economic history of Africa
- List of European colonies in Africa
- List of sovereign states and dependent territories in Africa
- States and Power in Africa
- Africa–United States relations
- Wars of national liberation
- Women in the decolonisation of Africa
- Year of Africa
