= Allied administration of Libya =

1943–1951 Anglo–French administration

Allied Occupation of Libya 1943~1951 Occupazione alleata della Libia (Italian) احتلال الحلفاء لليبيا (Arabic)
- 1943–1951
- Flag

- A map of Libya depicting the approximate occupation borders set up by the Allied Powers from 1943~1951
- Status: Military Administration
- Capital: Tripoli
- Common languages: English, French, Italian, Arabic
- History
  - Allied occupation of Libya: 13 May 1943
  - Italy officially renounces claim to Libya: 10 February 1947
  - Became the Kingdom of Libya: 24 December 1951
- Currency: Algerian franc (Fezzan-Ghadames); Egyptian pound (Cyrenaica); Military Authority Lira (Tripolitania)
Preceded by	Succeeded by
Italian Libya	Emirate of Cyrenaica; Kingdom of Libya

The Allied administration of Libya was the control of the ex-colony of Italian Libya by the Allies from 13 May 1943 until Libyan independence was granted in 1951. It was divided into two parts:

- British Military Administration of Libya (United Nations administration after 1949)
- French Military Territory of Fezzan-Ghadames (UN administration after 1949)

== Characteristics ==
The Allied administration was administered by the United Kingdom in Tripolitania and Cyrenaica, and by France in Fezzan. Officially Libya remained "Italian Libya" until February 1947, when Italy signed the Peace Treaty ceding all the colonies and possessions of the defeated former Italian Empire.

The British administered it as the British Military Administration of Libya. The French forces occupied the area that was the former Italian Territorio Sahara Libico and made several requests to administratively annex Fezzan to the French colonial Empire. The administrative personnel remained the former Italian bureaucrats.

The British administration began the training of a badly needed Libyan civil service. Italian administrators continued to be employed in Tripoli, however. The Italian legal code remained in effect for the duration of the war. In the lightly populated Fezzan region, a French military administration formed a counterpart to the British operation. With British approval, Free French forces moved north from Chad to take control of the territory in January 1943. French administration was directed by a staff stationed in Sabha, but it was largely exercised through Fezzan notables of the family of Sayf an Nasr. At the lower echelons, French troop commanders acted in both military and civil capacities according to customary French practice in the Algerian Sahara. In the west, Ghat was attached to the French military region of southern Algeria and Ghadamis to the French command of southern Tunisia--giving rise to Libyan nationalist fears that French intentions might include the ultimate detachment of Fezzan from Libya.

— Library of Congress:Libya,

== History ==
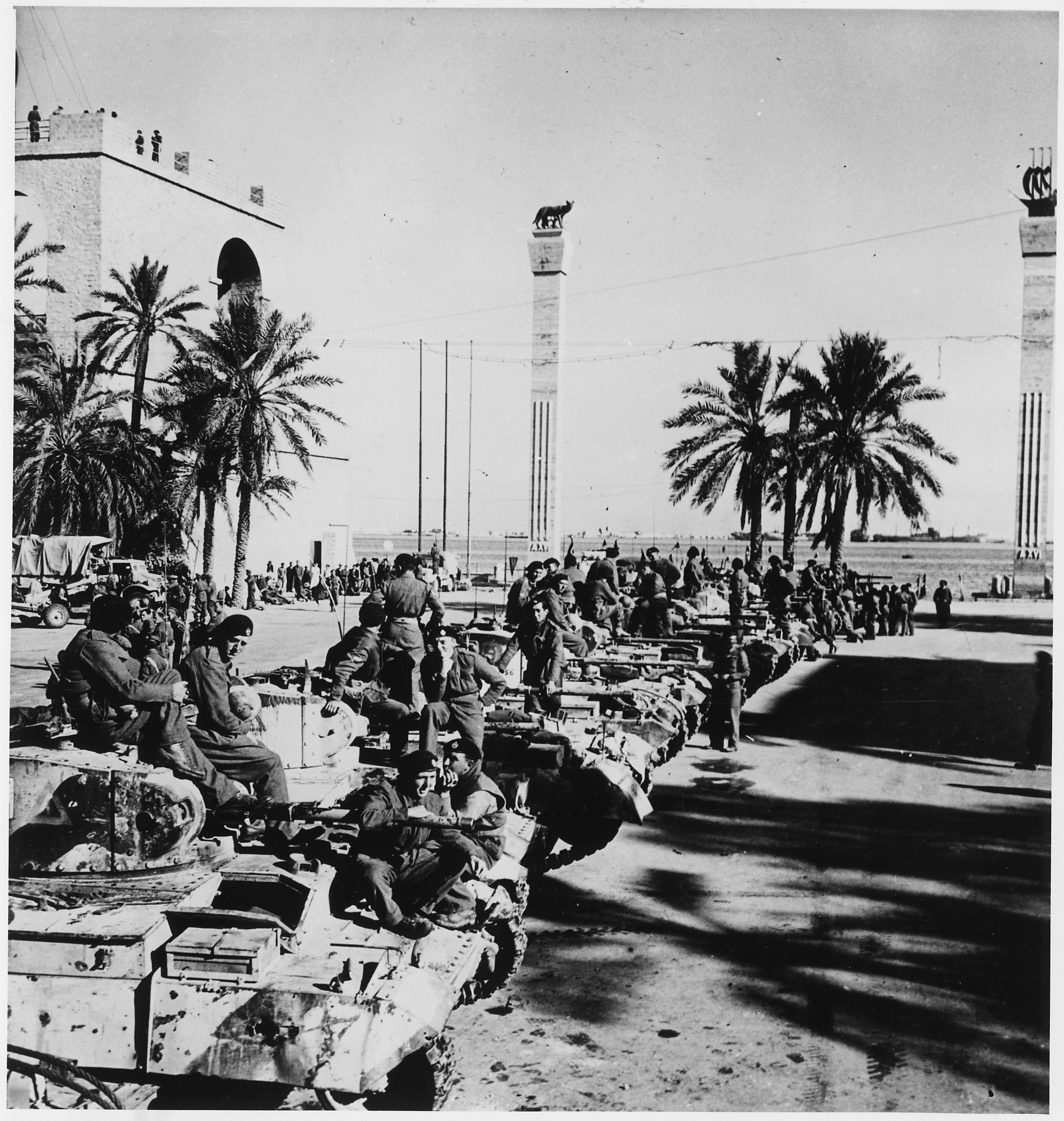
British tanks and crews line up on Tripoli's waterfront after capturing the city during World War II - December 1942

In November 1942, the Allied forces retook Cyrenaica. By February 1943, the last German and Italian soldiers were driven from Libya and the Allied occupation of Libya began.

In the early post-war period, Tripolitania and Cyrenaica remained under British administration, while the French controlled Fezzan. In 1944, Idris returned from exile in Cairo but declined to resume permanent residence in Cyrenaica until the removal in 1947 of some aspects of foreign control. Under the terms of the 1947 peace treaty with the Allies, Italy, which hoped to maintain the colony of Tripolitania, (and France, which wanted the Fezzan), relinquished all claims to Libya. Libya so remained united.

Severe anti-Jewish violence erupted in Libya following the liberation of North Africa by Allied troops. From 5–7 November 1945, more than 140 Jews (including 36 children) were killed and hundreds injured in a pogrom in Tripoli. Five synagogues in Tripoli and four in provincial towns were destroyed, and over 1,000 Jewish residences and commercial buildings were plundered in Tripoli alone.

In June 1948, anti-Jewish rioters in Libya killed another 12 Jews and destroyed 280 Jewish homes. The fear and insecurity which arose from these anti-Jewish attacks and the founding of the state of Israel led many Jews to flee Libya. From 1948 to 1951, 30,972 Libyan Jews moved to Israel. By the 1970s, the rest of Libyan Jews (some 7,000) were evacuated to Italy.

Disposition of Italian colonial holdings was a question that had to be considered before the peace treaty officially ending the war with Italy could be completed. Technically, Libya remained an Italian possession administered by Britain and France, but at the Potsdam Conference in 1945 the Allies--Britain, the Soviet Union, and the United States--agreed that the Italian colonies seized during the war should not be returned to Italy. Further consideration of the question was delegated to the Allied Council of Foreign Ministers, which included a French representative; although all council members initially favored some form of trusteeship, no formula could be devised for disposing of Libya. The United States suggested a trusteeship for the whole country under control of the United Nations (UN), whose charter had become effective in October 1945, to prepare it for self-government. The Soviet Union proposed separate provincial trusteeships, claiming Tripolitania for itself and assigning Fezzan to France and Cyrenaica to Britain. France, seeing no end to the discussions, advocated the return of the territory to Italy. To break the impasse, Britain finally recommended immediate independence for Libya

— Library of Congress: United Nations and Libya

Idris as-Senussi, the leader of the Senussi Muslim Sufi order, represented Libya in the UN negotiations, and on 24 December 1951, Libya declared its independence with representatives from Cyrenaica, Tripolitania and Fezzan declaring a union with the country being called the United Kingdom of Libya, and Idris as-Senussi being offered the crown. In accordance with the constitution the new country had a federal government with the three states of Cyrenaica, Tripolitania and Fezzan having autonomy. The kingdom also had three capital cities: Tripoli, Benghazi and Bayda. Two years after independence, on 28 March 1953, Libya joined the Arab League.

When Libya declared its independence on 24 December 1951, ending the Allied occupation of Libya, it was the first country to achieve independence through the United Nations and one of the first former European possessions in Africa to gain independence.

== See also ==
- 1945 anti-Jewish riots in Tripolitania
- 1948 anti-Jewish riots in Tripolitania
