= Tripolitanian lira =

Currency of the British Military Administration of Libya

ليره (Arabic); lira tripolitana (Italian)
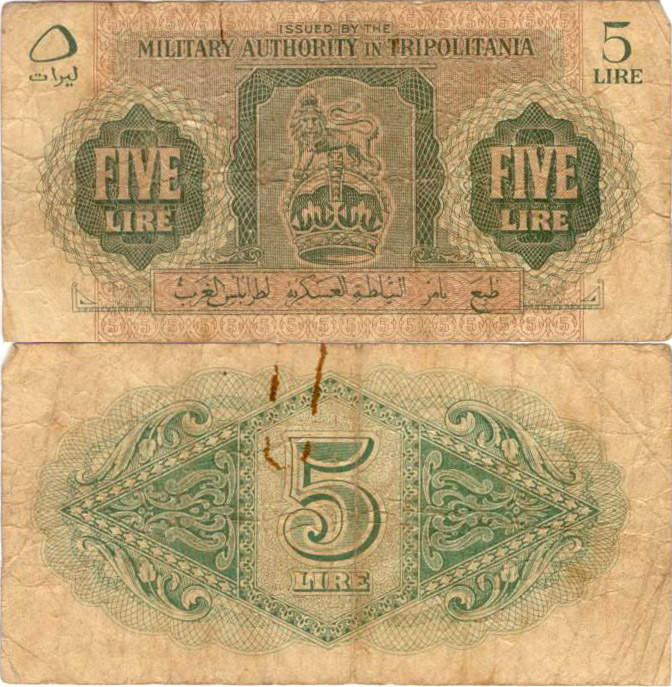
- Tripolitanian 5 lire note

Unit
- Plural: lire
- Symbol: MAL

Denominations
- Subunit
- 1/100: cent
- Banknotes: 1 MAL, 2 MAL, 5 MAL, 10 MAL, 50 MAL, 100 MAL, 500 MAL, 1,000 MAL
- Coins: circulating coins of the Italian lira

Demographics
- Replaced by: Libyan pound
- User(s): None, previously: (United Kingdom) BMA/BA Tripolitania (1943-1951); Tripolitania Province, Kingdom of Libya (1951-1952)

Issuance
- Central bank: Military Authority in Tripolitania

Valuation
- Pegged with: £1 sterling = 480 MAL
- This infobox shows the latest status before this currency was rendered obsolete.

The lira (Arabic: ليره, plural: lire, abbreviation: MAL), officially known as the Military Authority Lira, was the currency of the British zone of occupation (later Mandate Territory) in Libya between 1943 and 1951, and of the province of Tripolitania until early 1952. It was issued by the Military Authority in Tripolitania and circulated together with the Italian lira at par. This situation reflected that of Italy, where the AM-lira was minted by the United States. The Tripolitanian and the Italian lira were replaced in early 1952 by the Libyan pound at a rate of £L1 = 480 MAL.

== Paper money ==
No coins were issued for this currency, with old Italian coins still circulating, although heavily devalued. The 50 centesimo piece for example was worth just a quarter of a penny. Notes were issued in denominations of 1 lira and 2, 5, 10, 50, 100, 500 and 1,000 lire.

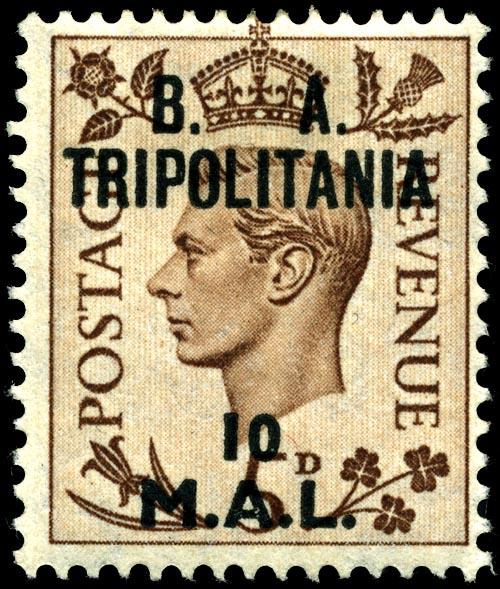
1950 Tripolitanian stamp denominated "10 M.A.L."

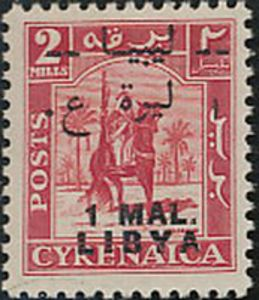
1951 Libyan stamp denominated "1 MAL."
