= Emirate of Cyrenaica =

1949–1951 emirate in Northern Africa

Emirate of Cyrenaica إمارة برقة (Arabic)
- 1949–1951
- Flag Coat of Arms
- Anthem: النشيد الوطني لإمارة برقة; National Anthem of the Emirate of Cyrenaica
- Cyrenaica within Libya
- Capital: Benghazi
- Common languages: Arabic, Awjila Berber
- Religion: Islam
- Government: Absolute monarchy
- Emir
  - 1949–1951: Idris
- British Resident
  - 1949–1951: Eric de Candole
- History
  - Independence: 1 March 1949
  - Joined Tripolitania and Fezzan-Ghadames to form the Kingdom of Libya: 24 December 1951
- Currency: Egyptian pound
Preceded by	Succeeded by
British Military Administration	Kingdom of Libya

The Emirate of Cyrenaica (Arabic: إمارة برقة) came into existence when Sayyid Idris unilaterally proclaimed Cyrenaica an independent Senussi emirate on 1 March 1949, backed by the United Kingdom. Sayyid Idris proclaimed himself Emir of Cyrenaica at a 'national conference' in Benghazi. It effectively succeeded the pre-Second World War Italian Cyrenaica. The recognition by the British failed to influence the attitude of the United Nations, and in a resolution passed on 21 November 1949 Britain and France were directed to prepare Libya's independence. The independence of the Kingdom of Libya was declared on 24 December 1951, and on 27 December, Emir Idris was enthroned as King Idris I.

The black flag with white star and crescent symbol was adopted by Idris as he was proclaimed Emir in 1947. The flag became the basis of the flag of Libya of 1951, with the addition of a red and a green stripe, representing Tripolitania and Fezzan, respectively. Idris as king of Libya kept the flag of the emirate as his personal Royal Standard, with the addition of a white crown in the upper hoist.

On 6 March 2012, mirroring the events 63 years earlier, a similar kind of meeting was held in Benghazi, calling for more autonomy and federalism for Cyrenaica. Ahmed al-Senussi, a relative of King Idris, was announced as the leader of the self-declared Cyrenaica Transitional Council.
