= Fezzan-Ghadames Military Territory =

1947–1951 French rule of southwestern Libya as part of the Allied administration

Military Territory of the Fezzan-Ghadames Territoire militaire du Fezzan-Ghadamès (French) Territorio militare del Fezzan-Ghadames (Italian) إقليم فزان-غدامس العسكري (Arabic)
- 1943–1951
- Flag

- A map of Libya depicting the approximate occupation borders set up by the (Free) French from 1943~1951
- Status: French Military Administration (1943–1950); French civil administration (1950–1951)
- Capital: Sabha
- Common languages: Italian, French, Arabic
- Governor
  - 1943: Raymond Delange
  - 1943–1945: Robert Thiriet
  - 1946–1947: Pierre Florimond
  - 1947–1949: Maurice Sarazac
  - 1949–1950 (acting): Jacques Leneveu
  - 1950–1951: Maurice Sarazac (Note: as Resident)
  - 1951–1953: Auguste Cauneille (Note: as Resident)
- Hakim
  - 1946–1950: Ahmad Sayf an-Nasr
- Historical era: Cold War
  - Free French occupation: 8 January 1943
  - Established: 11 April 1943
  - Italy relinquishes Libya: 10 February 1947
  - UN administration: 10 December 1949
  - Joined Tripolitania and Cyrenaica to form the Kingdom of Libya (with autonomy): 24 December 1951
  - Autonomy ended: 27 April 1963
- Currency: Algerian franc
| Preceded by | Succeeded by |
| Italian Libya | Kingdom of Libya |
- Today part of: Libya

The Fezzan-Ghadames Military Territory was a territory in the southern part of Italian Libya which was occupied and administered by Free France from 1943 until Libya gained independence in 1951. It was part of the allied occupation of Libya.

Free French forces from French Chad occupied the area that was the former Italian Southern Military Territory in 1943, and made several requests to annex Fezzan administratively to France's North African possessions.

The British administration began the training of a badly needed Libyan civil service. Italian administrators continued to be employed in Tripoli, however. The Italian legal code remained in effect for the duration of the war. In the lightly populated Fezzan region, a French military administration formed a counterpart to the British operation. With British approval, Free French forces moved north from Chad to take control of the territory in January 1943. French administration was directed by a staff stationed in Sabha, but it was largely exercised through Fezzan notables of the family of Sayf an Nasr. At the lower echelons, French troop commanders acted in both military and civil capacities according to customary French practice in the Algerian Sahara. In the west, Ghat was attached to the French military region of southern Algeria and Ghadamis to the French command of southern Tunisia – giving rise to Libyan nationalist fears that French intentions might include the ultimate detachment of Fezzan from Libya.

Fezzan joined Tripolitania and Cyrenaica to form the Kingdom of Libya on 24 December 1951. It was the first country to achieve independence through the United Nations and one of the first former European possessions in Africa to gain independence.
