= British Military Administration (Libya) =

1942–1951 government in Northern Africa

British Military Administration of Libya Amministrazione Militare Britannica della Libia (Italian) الإدارة البريطانية العسكرية في ليبيا (Arabic)
- 1942–1951
- Flag

- A map of Libya depicting the approximate occupation borders set up by the United Kingdom from 1943~1951
- Status: British Military Administration (1943–1950); British Civil Administration (1950–1951)
- Capital: Tripoli
- Common languages: English (Official), Italian, Arabic
- Chief Administrator (Tripolitania)
  - 1943–1951: Travers Blackley
- Chief Administrator (Cyrenaica)
  - 1942–1945: Duncan Cumming
  - 1945–1946: Peter Acland
  - 1946–1948: James Haugh
  - 1948 (acting): Arthur Parker
  - 1948–1949: Eric de Candole
- History
  - Allied occupation of Libya: 13 May 1943
  - Italy relinquishes Libya: 10 February 1947
  - Emirate of Cyrenaica created: 1 March 1949
  - UN administration: 10 December 1949
  - Joined Fezzan-Ghadames to form the Kingdom of Libya (with autonomy for Tripolitania and Cyrenaica): 24 December 1951
  - Autonomy ended: 27 April 1963
- Currency: Military Authority Lira (Tripolitania); Egyptian pound (Cyrenaica)
Preceded by	Succeeded by
Italian Libya	1949: Emirate of Cyrenaica; 1951: Kingdom of Libya
- Today part of: Libya

The British Military Administration of Libya was the control of the regions of Cyrenaica and Tripolitania of the former Italian Libya by the British from 1943 until Libyan independence in 1951. It was part of the Allied administration of Libya.

== History ==
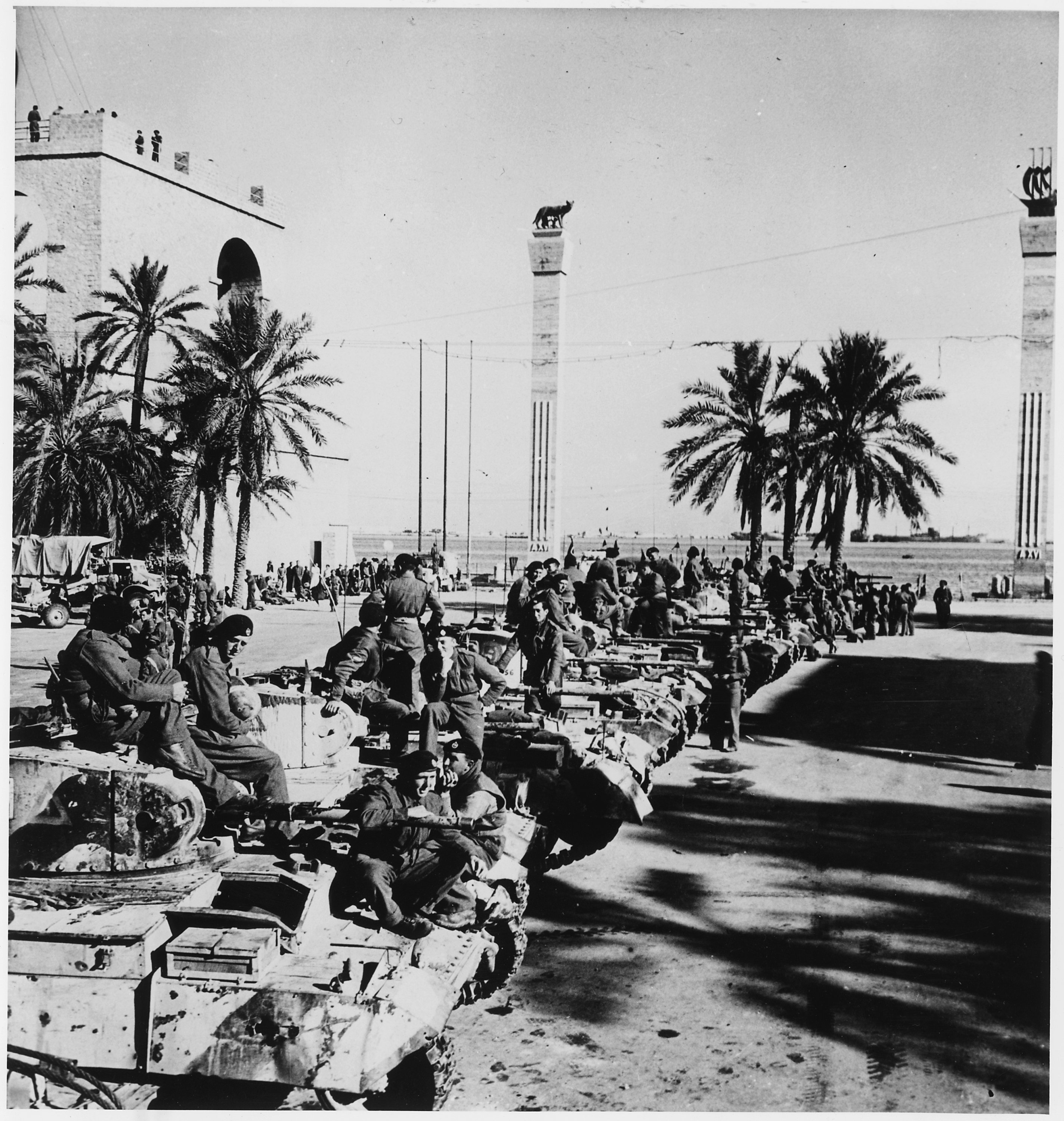
British tanks and crews line up on Tripoli's waterfront after capturing the city during World War II - December 1942

In November 1942, the Allied forces retook Cyrenaica. By February 1943, the last German and Italian soldiers were driven from Libya and the Allied occupation of Libya began.

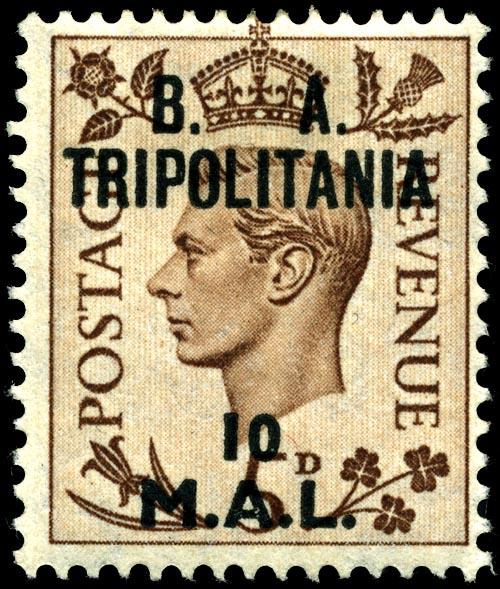
Tripolitania 10-lire stamp of 1950 with face of King George VI

Tripolitania and Cyrenaica remained under British administration, while the French controlled Fezzan. In 1944, Idris as-Senussi returned from exile in Cairo but declined to resume permanent residence in Cyrenaica until the removal in 1947 of some aspects of foreign control. Under the terms of the 1947 peace treaty with the Allies, Italy, which hoped to maintain the colony of Tripolitania and France, which wanted the Fezzan, relinquished all claims to Libya. Libya so remained united.

Following the liberation of North Africa by Allied troops, over 130 Jews were killed in anti-Jewish disturbances across Tripolitania in November 1945. In June 1948, anti-Jewish rioters in Libya killed another 12 Jews and destroyed 280 Jewish homes. The fear and insecurity which arose from these anti-Jewish attacks and the founding of the state of Israel led many Jews to flee Libya. From 1948 to 1951, 30,972 Libyan Jews moved to Israel. By the 1970s, the rest of Libyan Jews (some 7,000) were evacuated to Italy.

Disposition of Italian colonial holdings was a question that had to be considered before the peace treaty officially ending the war with Italy could be completed. Technically, Libya remained an Italian possession administered by Britain and France, but at the Potsdam Conference in 1945 the Allies—Britain, the Soviet Union, and the United States—agreed that the Italian colonies seized during the war should not be returned to Italy. Further consideration of the question was delegated to the Allied Council of Foreign Ministers, which included a French representative; although all council members initially favored some form of trusteeship, no formula could be devised for disposing of Libya. The United States suggested a trusteeship for the whole country under control of the United Nations (UN), whose charter had become effective in October 1945, to prepare it for self-government. The Soviet Union proposed separate provincial trusteeships, claiming Tripolitania for itself and assigning Fezzan to France and Cyrenaica to Britain. France, seeing no end to the discussions, advocated the return of the territory to Italy. To break the impasse, Britain finally recommended immediate independence for Libya.

In 1949, the Emirate of Cyrenaica was created and only Tripolitania remained under direct British military administration. A year later, in 1950, it was granted civil instead of military administration. Idris as-Senussi, the Emir of Cyrenaica and the leader of the Senussi Muslim Sufi order, represented Libya in the UN negotiations, and on 24 December 1951, Libya declared its independence.

== Independence ==
In 1951, with representatives from Cyrenaica, Tripolitania and Fezzan declaring a union and with the country being called the United Kingdom of Libya, Idris was offered the crown. In accordance with the constitution the new country had a federal government with the three states of Cyrenaica, Tripolitania and Fezzan having autonomy. The kingdom also had three capital cities: Tripoli, Benghazi and Bayda. Two years after independence, on 28 March 1953, Libya joined the Arab League. When Libya declared its independence it was the first country to achieve independence through the United Nations and one of the first former European possessions in Africa to gain independence.

== See also ==
- Italian Libya
- Allied administration of Libya
- Fezzan-Ghadames Military Territory
