= Postage stamps and postal history of Fezzan and Ghadames =

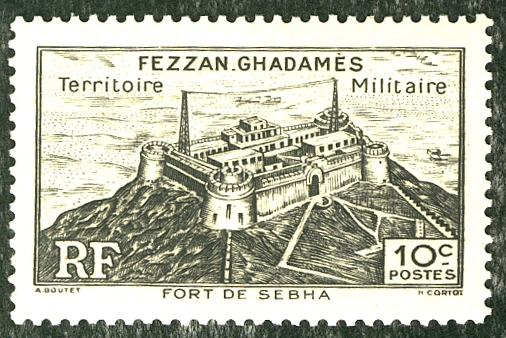
Stamp of Fezzan and Ghadames showing Fort Sebha, 1946

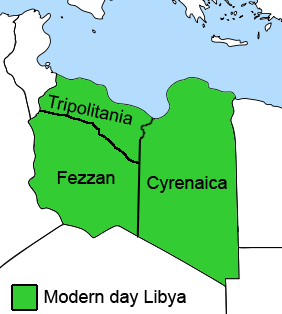
A map showing the location of Fezzan

This is a survey of the postage stamps and postal history of Fezzan and Ghadames, both now part of Libya.

Fezzan is a south-western region of modern Libya. It is largely desert but broken by mountains, uplands, and dry river valleys (wadis) in the north, where oases enable ancient towns and villages to survive deep in the otherwise inhospitable Sahara.

Ghadames is an oasis town in the west of Libya. It lies roughly 549 km in the southwest of Tripoli, near the borders with Algeria and Tunisia.

Fezzan and Ghadames was a territory in the southern part of the former Italian colony of Libya controlled by the French from 1943 until Libyan independence in 1951. It was part of the Allied administration of Libya.

== Fezzan and Ghadames ==
Fezzan was captured by Free French forces of Chad in 1943. Initially, twelve regular, three air mail, five pairs of parcel post, and five postage due stamps of Libya and Italy were overprinted Fezzan and surcharged in French currency, in assorted denominations ranging from 50 centimes to 50 francs. These stamps are listed in the French Ceres catalogue of French Colonies in both mint and used condition. They are mentioned in passing in the Scott catalogs but are not listed or priced. Stamps of Algeria were used between 1943 and 1946. A set of 15 regular stamps (10c to 50f) was issued for Fezzan-Ghadames in 1946, followed in 1948 by two airmail stamps (100f and 200f), inscribed "Fezzan".

== Separate issues ==
In 1949, separate issues appeared for Fezzan (a regular series of 11 denominations from 1 to 50 francs, plus six postage due stamps ranging from 1 to 20f) and Ghadames, consisting of eight regular (4f to 25f) and two airmail (50 and 100f) stamps, featuring the Cross of Agades.

A two-value set of semi-postal stamps appeared in 1950. The final issue under French occupation of this remote desert territory appeared in 1951, consisting of twelve regular and two airmail stamps in denominations from 30c to 200f, before Fezzan-Ghadames was incorporated into the newly independent kingdom of Libya.

== See also ==
- Postage stamps and postal history of Cyrenaica
- Postage stamps and postal history of Libya
- Postage stamps of Tripolitania
