= Revenue stamps of Libya =

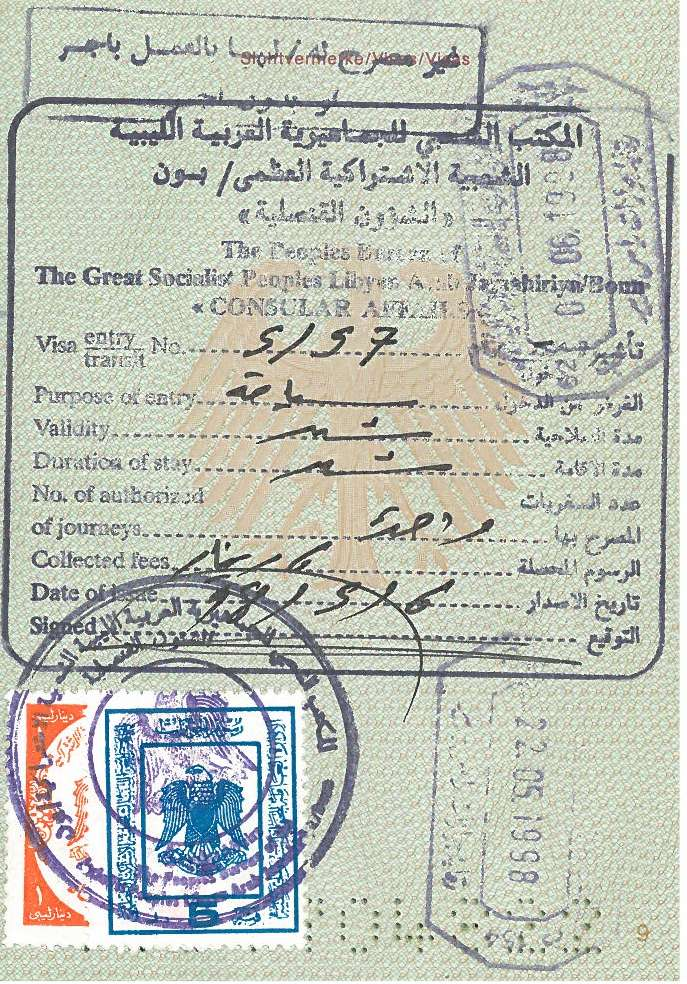
Libyan passport stamps on a 1998 visa.

Libya first issued revenue stamps when it was an Italian colony in 1913 and continues to do so to this day. The provinces of Cyrenaica, Tripolitania and Fezzan as well as the municipality of Tripoli also had separate revenue issues until the 1950s and 1960s.

== Libya general issues ==
When it was an Italian colony, various Italian and the Italian Colonies revenue stamps were overprinted for use in Libya from 1913 onwards. There were two types of overprints, either including the year of issue such as LIBIA-1913 or just LIBIA. There were several types, including Stamp Duty (Marca da Bollo), Land Rights (Diritti Fondiari), Bill of Exchange (Tassa di Bollo per Cambiali), Weights and Measures (Pesi, Misure e Marchio), Passports (Atti Esteri Passaporti) and Authentications (Passaporto Vidimazione).

The next Libyan revenues were issued after the Kingdom of Libya was formed in 1951. Cyrenaican revenue stamps were further overprinted ليبيا LIBYA, and these were replaced by King Idris postage stamps overprinted REVENUE or FEDERAL REVENUE in English and Arabic between 1954 and 1956. Between 1955 and 1967 a new design showing the country's coat of arms was issued. Several different types of these exist, and there were separate issues for Consular Service, Federal Revenue, Priority and Revenue. Between 1968 and 1969 a new design showing oil wells replaced the coat of arms issues. Apart from these, between the early 1960s and 1968 designs of revenues from Tripolitania and Cyrenaica were reissued with altered inscriptions for use in all of Libya.

After the Kingdom was overthrown by a coup d'état led by Muammar Gaddafi in 1969, revenues of the Kingdom were overprinted L.A.R. in Arabic. A new design with a central octagon with rounded edges, surrounded by four rectangular panels was issued around 1970, and this design was reissued several times. A keytype with the country's coats of arms was issued for Consular Service, Passport Fees and War Tax between 1970 and 2002. There were various issues reflecting the changes in the coat of arms. Between 1974 and the 1990s there were also separate designs for Airport Tax, Medical Fee and Municipal Revenue issues.

Libyan revenues with the central octagon design remain in use to this day. They were not replaced by new issues after the civil war in 2011.

== Regional issues ==
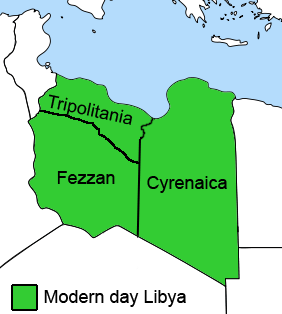
Map of Libya, showing the provinces of Tripolitania, Cyrenaica and Fezzan.

=== Tripolitania ===
When Tripolitania was an Italian colony, Italian Bill of Exchange (Tassa di Bollo per Cambiali) and Weights and Measures (Pesi, Misure e Marchio) revenues were overprinted Tripolitania. When it was under British occupation in 1946, Stamp Duty (Marca da Bollo) stamps of the Italian Colonies and Bill of Exchange (Tassa di Bollo per Cambiali) stamps of Italian East Africa were overprinted B.M.A. (British Military Administration) for use in Tripolitania. In 1950 revenues of the Italian Colonies overprinted B.Adm.T. (British Administration Tripolitania) replaced these, reflecting the change from military to civil administration. These were replaced a year later with stamps overprinted simply Tripolitania, some with a new value in Military Authority Lire (MAL). Later that year Cyrenaican postage stamps were overprinted for Tripolitania in English and Arabic, again with new values in MAL.

In 1951, after Tripolitania became part of the Kingdom of Libya, a new design showing the Tajura Mosque and a palm tree was issued. Several sets were issued in this design, and these were used until the 1960s.

==== Tripoli Municipal ====
Various revenues were issued for the municipality of Tripoli while Libya was an Italian colony as well as while under British occupation. There were several different types for a number of uses. Between 1954 and 1961 a new design showing the Assaraya al-Hamra castle and inscribed Municipal Revenue was issued.

=== Cyrenaica ===
Cyrenaica's first revenues were issued when it was an Italian colony. Italian Weights and Measures (Pesi, Misure e Marchio) revenues were overprinted Cirenaica. In 1946 or 1947, while under British occupation, Eritrean revenue stamps were overprinted CYRENAICA P.T. 25. Two versions exist, one with and one without a watermark. Between 1949 and 1951 while Cyrenaica was an independent emirate postage stamps were used for revenue purposes. Later on several of these postage stamps were issued overprinted Revenue. Around 1952 Tripolitanian revenues were overprinted for Cyrenaica in Arabic, and from 1955 to 1957 a design showing the Atiq Mosque and a palm tree was issued. These were used along with a similar design showing Benghazi's old Town Hall from 1955 to 1963.

=== Fezzan ===
Fezzan issued a few revenues in the 1950s. There were types inscribed Rev. Stamp or Impot du Timbre.

== Stamped paper ==
Libya and Cyrenaica both issued stamped paper in the 1950s.

== See also ==
- Davies Collection of Libyan revenues 1955-1969
- Postage stamps and postal history of Libya
