= Currency of San Marino =

Currency of San Marino may refer to:

- Sammarinese lira (1860s–2002), pegged 1:1 to the Italian lira
- Euro (since 2002)
