= Postage stamps and postal history of Italy =

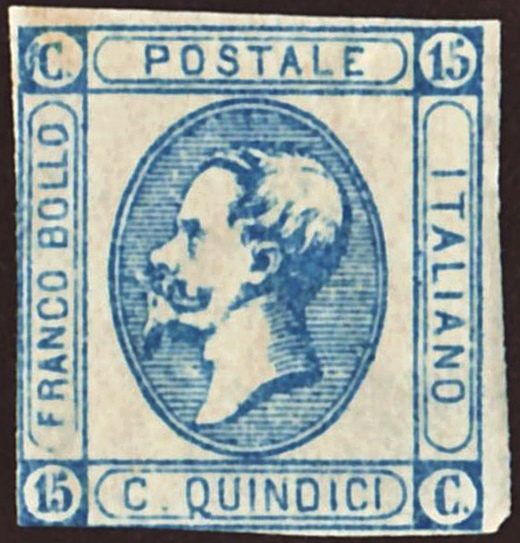
An 1863 stamp of the Kingdom of Italy depicting the profile of King Victor Emanuel II and the inscription "Postale italiano"

This is an introduction to the postal and philatelic history of Italy.

As Italy was not unified until 1861, its early postal history is tied to the various kingdoms and smaller realms that ruled in the peninsula.

== Pre-unification ==
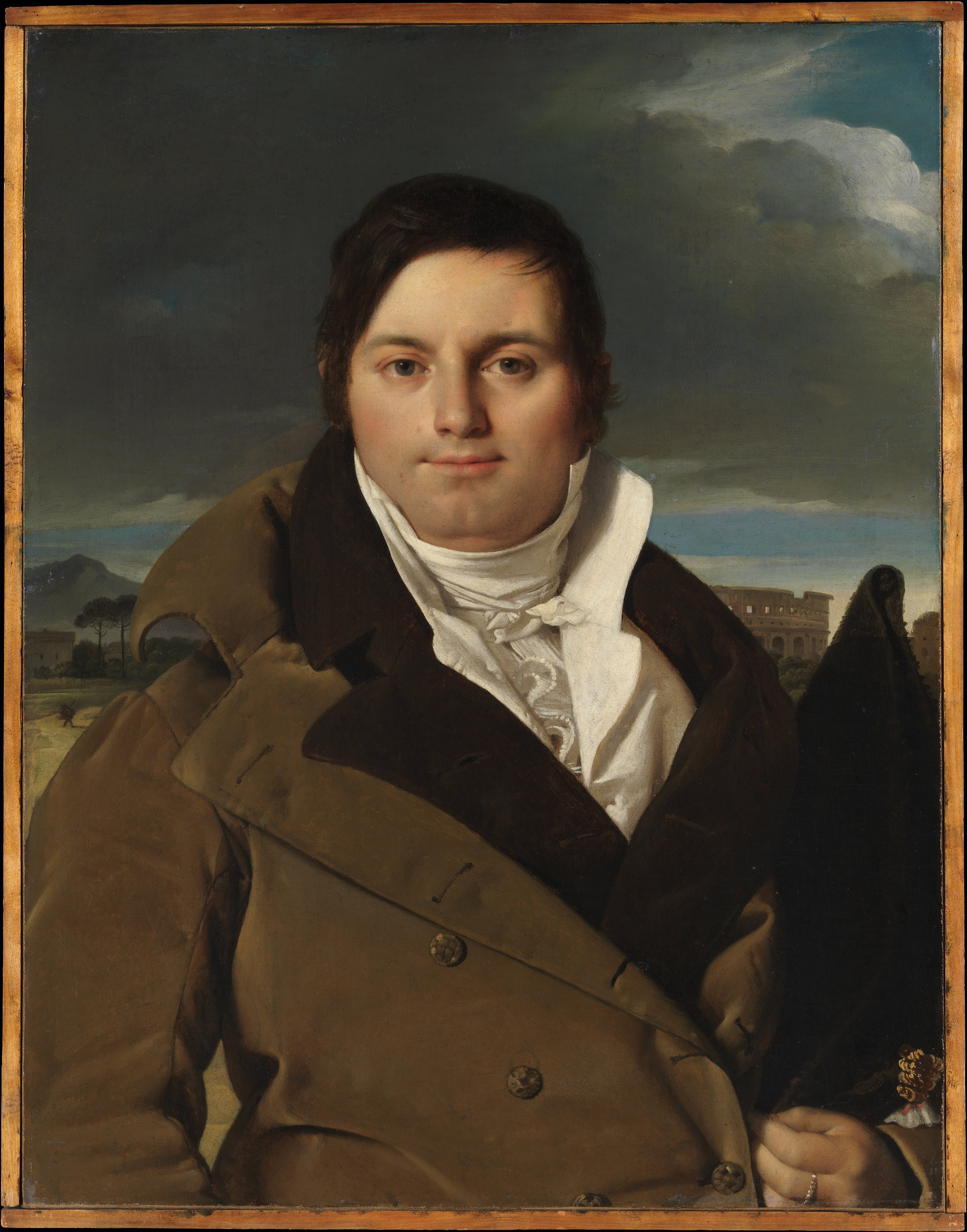
Joseph-Antoine Moltedo, head of the Roman postal service, 1803–1814

=== Napoleonic Italy (1805–1814) ===
During the Napoleonic Wars, the geopolitical instability of the region led to a wide variety in postal systems. In the Kingdom of Italy, the short-lived Italian Republic, and other dependent regions, Napoleon appointed postal administrators loyal to him.

After the Treaty of Paris in 1814, the independent Italian kingdoms regained control of their postal systems.

=== 1814–1860 ===
The Cavallini ("little horses") of Sardinia was an early private mail service, notable for the introduction of prepaid stamped lettersheets in 1819.

The first postage stamps in Italy were also issued by the Sardinian kingdom. In 1850, Count Camillo Cavour drafted a report to the Chamber of Deputies of the Kingdom of Piedmont-Sardinia proposing postal reform along the lines of that which had been adopted in several European states, and providing for the introduction of postage stamps, for which a new word - francobollo - was coined. The reform became law in November, and went into effect 1 January 1851.

After some casting around for expertise in the newfangled art of stamp printing, the government settled on the house of Francesco Matraire in Turin. Postage stamps of the Sardinian kingdom with the embossed profile of Victor Emmanuel II without indicating the name of the state were printed by Matraire and issued on January 1, 1851.

Following Sardinia, other Italian states also issued stamps. These include Tuscany (April 1851), the Papal States (January 1852), Modena (June 1852), Parma (June 1852), Kingdom of the Two Sicilies (Naples - January 1858; Sicily - January 1859), Romagna (September 1859) . In the Lombardo-Venetian kingdom under the Austrian Empire, stamps were also issued with denominations in the local currency.

=== Gallery of Italian Stamps, 1814–1860 ===
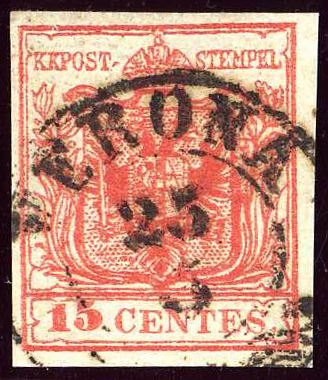
Stamp of the Kingdom of Lombardy–Venetia, 1850

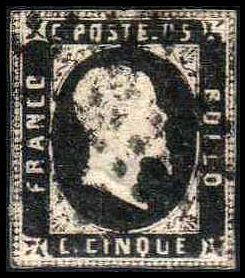
Stamp of the Kingdom of Sardinia, 1851

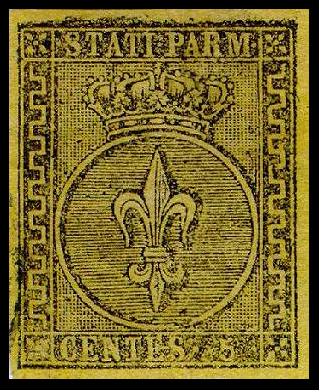
The first stamp of the Duchy of Parma, Piacenza and Guastalla, 1852

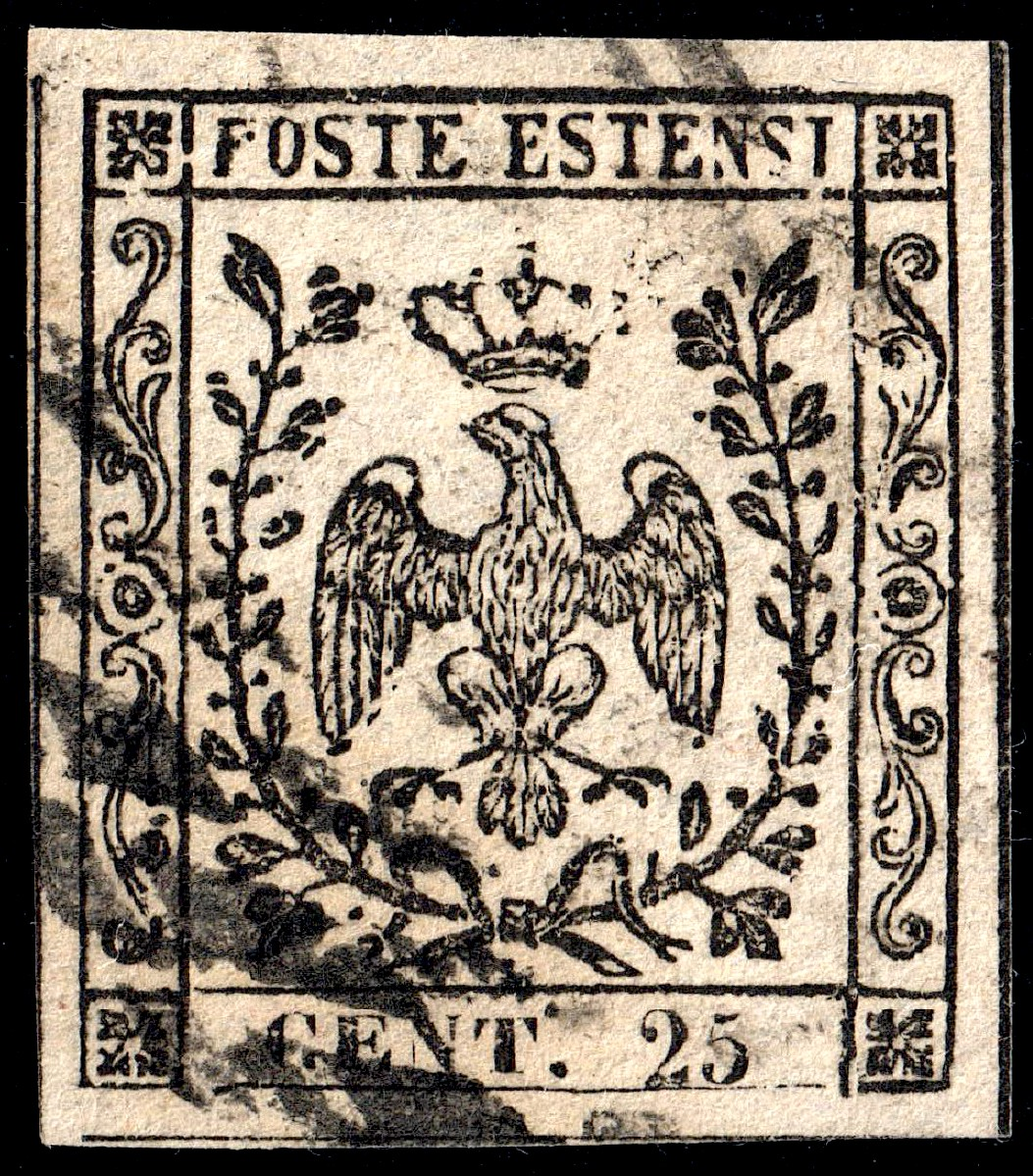
Stamp of the Duchy of Modena, 1852

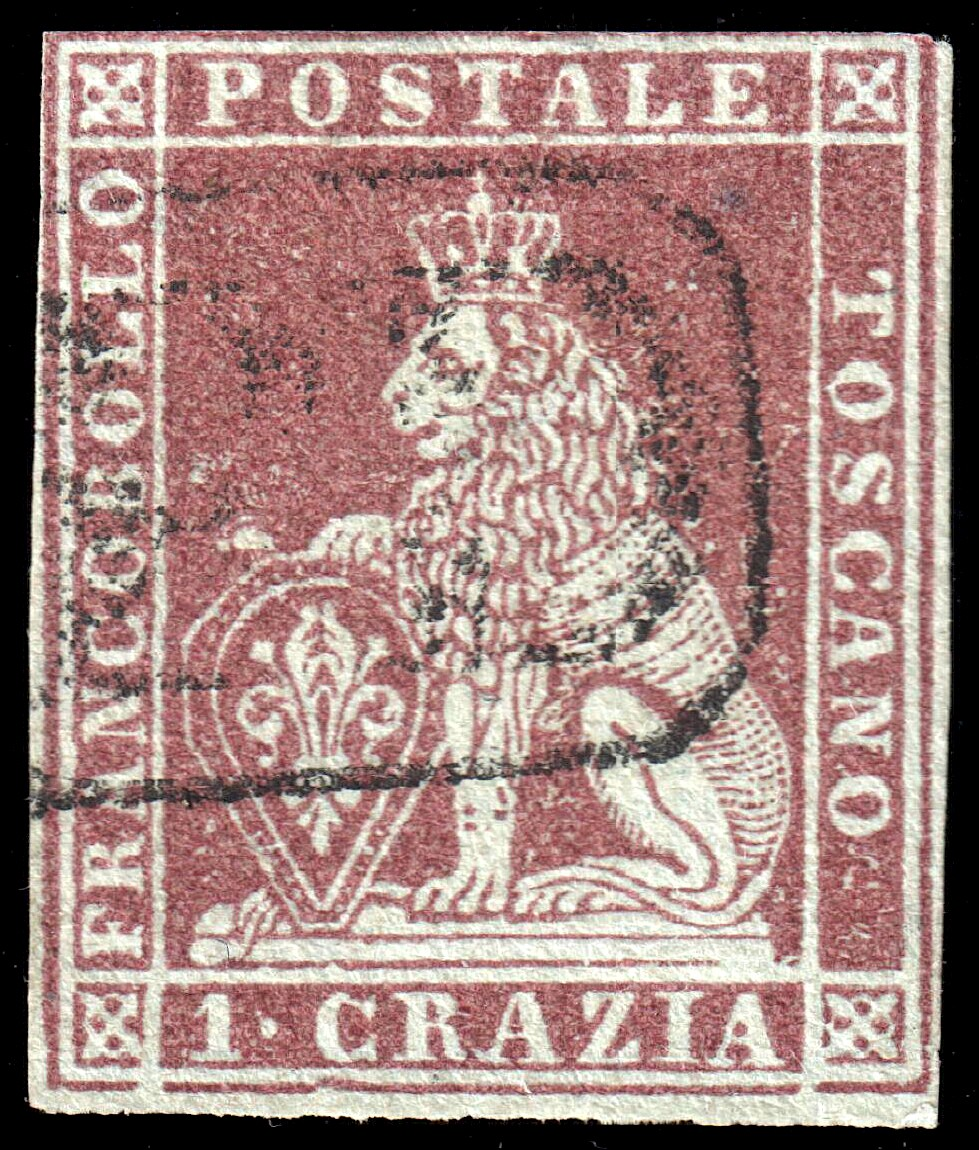
Stamp of the Grand Duchy of Tuscany, 1853

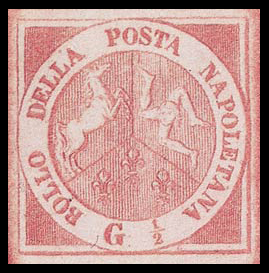
Stamp for Naples in the Kingdom of the Two Sicilies, 1858

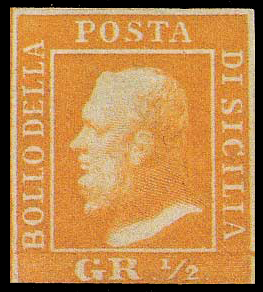
Stamp for Sicily in the Kingdom of the Two Sicilies, 1859

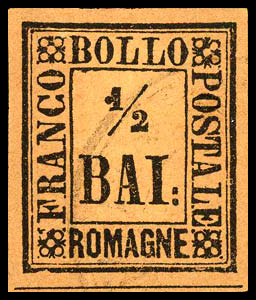
Stamp of the Papal State of Romagna, 1859

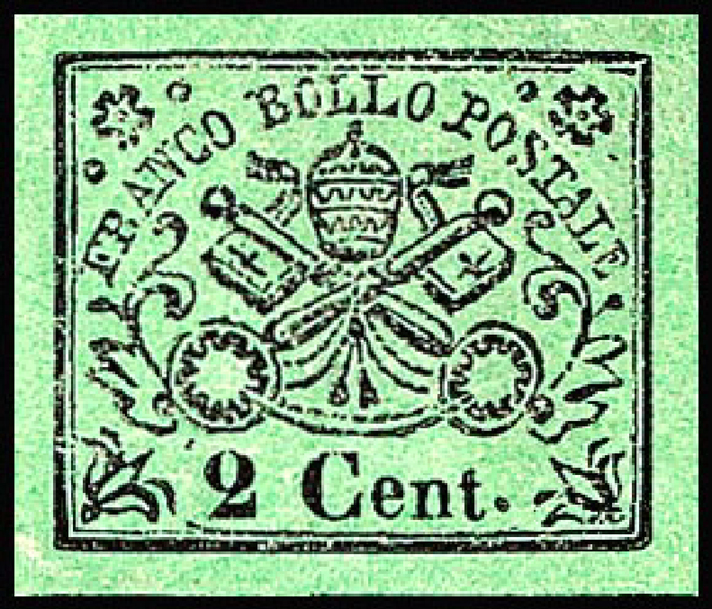
Stamp of the Papal States, 1867

== The Kingdom of Italy ==
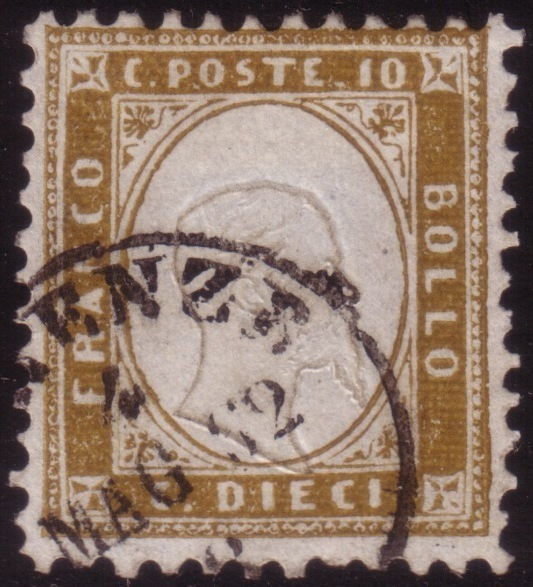
An 1862 stamp of the Sardinian kingdom, considered the first stamps of the Kingdom of Italy

Following the unification of Italy during 1860 and 1861, stamps in use in each of the territories that joined Italy were withdrawn from circulation and replaced with the stamps of the Sardinian kingdom. The transition took place in Modena, Parma and Romagna on February 1, 1860, in Naples on September 15, 1862 (although local authorities had previously printed stamps depicting the coat of arms of Savoy), and in the Papal States - only in 1870. Matraire's stamps were reprinted several times, and those printed after 17 March 1861 are usually considered the first stamps of the Kingdom of Italy.

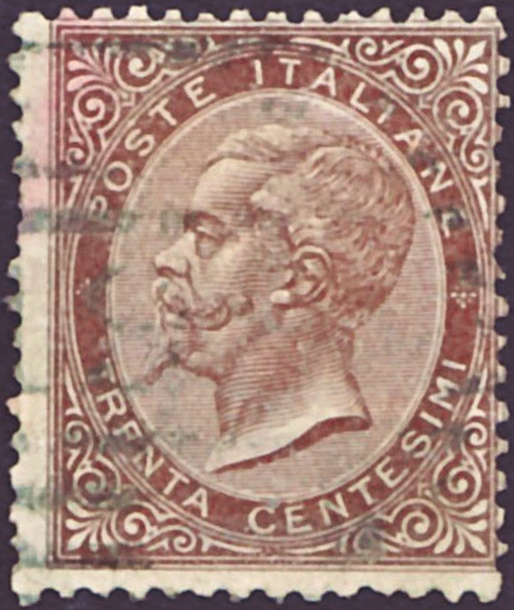
An 1863 stamp of the Kingdom of Italy.

Perforated stamps of the fourth standard edition of the Sardinian kingdom with an embossed profile of Victor Emmanuel II were issued in 1862. Starting on 1 January 1863, uniform postal rates went into effect.

In 1862 Count Ambjörn Sparre won the stamp contract, but his designs were not liked, and he seemed unable to produce the stamps. In danger of running out of stamps altogether, at the end of 1862 the Italian government once again turned to Matraire, who quickly produced a stamp with a nominal value of 15 centesimo by lithography, depicting the profile of King Victor Emanuel II and the inscription "Postale italiano".

The contract with Count Sparre was annulled in March 1863, and a new contract was given to the British printing house De La Rue. A series of eight stamps with the inscription "Poste italiane" in denominations from 1 centesimo to 2 lira was issued on December 1, 1863.

Italy joined the Universal Postal Union on 1 July 1875. Until 1877, Italian stamps were used in San Marino.

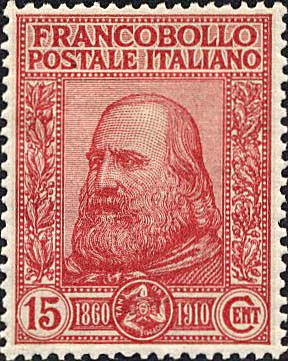
A 1910 stamp commemorating the 50th anniversary of the Expedition of the Thousand

=== Umberto I ===
Umberto I succeeded his father in 1878, which necessitated a new issue of stamps. First appearing on 15 August 1879, they were the first stamps of the kingdom to be entirely designed, engraved, and printed by Italians. Since considerable stocks of Victor Emmanuel stamps were left over and finances were poor, the old stamps continued in use for some years, and some values of stamps were little-used during Umberto's reign.

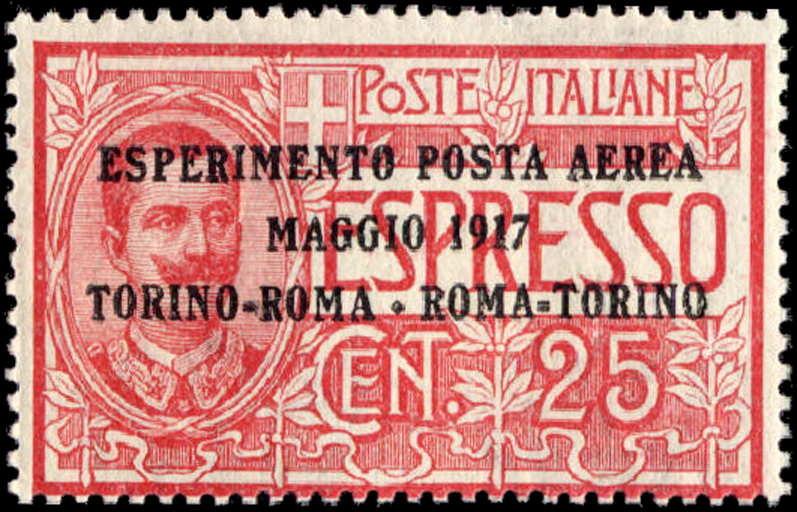
A 1917 Italian airmail stamp for the Troins-Rome flight

The new series incorporated rates and colors mandated by the Universal Postal Union.

=== Victor Emmanuel III ===
The first stamps with a portrait of Victor Emanuel III appeared in July 1901. The first series of commemorative stamps was issued in April 1910 to mark the 50th anniversary of the Expedition of the Thousand. The world's first airmail stamps were issued in 1917 when Poste italiane overprinted their existing special delivery stamps.

=== Fascist regime ===
==== The Imperial Series ====
Until 1929, all definitive stamps were issued with the portrait of the king or the coat of arms. In April 1929, the so-called "Imperial Series" ("Serie Imperiale") was released, the first definitive series of Benito Mussolini's fascist government. The stamp designs featured images of the Capitoline she-wolf with Romulus and Remus, Julius Caesar, Octavian Augustus and Italia, and contained the fasces, symbol of the fascist regime.

==== Italian Social Republic ====
In 1943, the Germans set up the Italian Social Republic (RSI) in northern Italy, a Nazi puppet state with Mussolini installed as leader after he was rescued by German paratroopers.

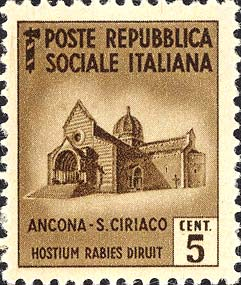
Stamp of the Italian Social Republic, 1944

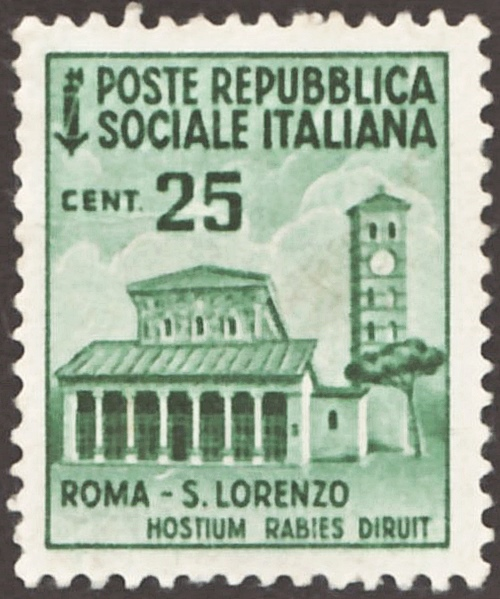
Stamp of the Italian Social Republic, 1944

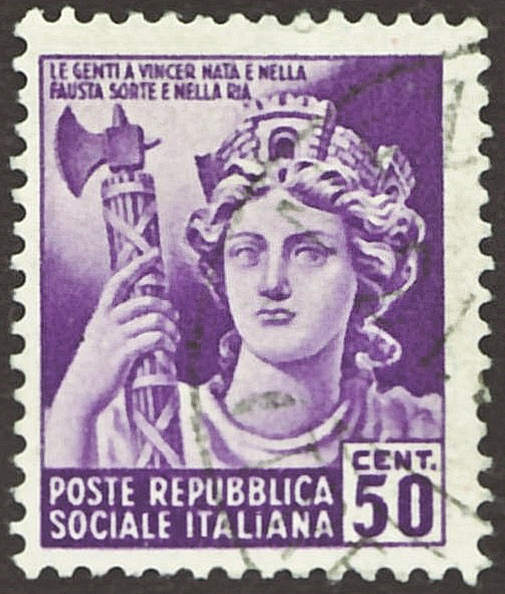
Stamp of the Italian Social Republic, 1944

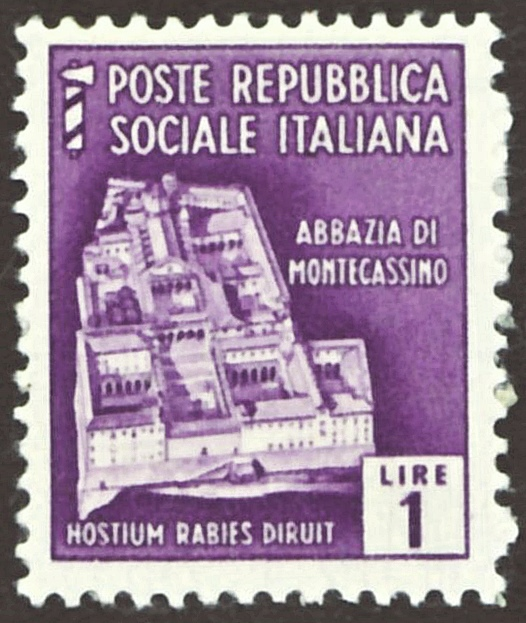
Stamp of the Italian Social Republic, 1944

== Italian Republic ==
Italy became a republic after a referendum held on 2 June 1946.

=== Fiume stamp controversy ===
In 2007, the issue of an Italian stamp featuring the Croatian city of Rijeka caused a controversy. The stamp referred to the city in its usual Italian name of Fiume, claiming it was former Italian territory. This is seen as offensive in Croatia.

== Aegean Islands issues ==
The Italian Islands of the Aegean were the Italian possession in the Dodecanese from 1912 to 1945. Italian stamps overprinted "Egeo" and "Isole Italiane dell' Egeo" were issued for the Islands. Stamps were also issued for the individual islands: Calchi (Karki), Calino (Calimno), Kasos (Caso), Cos (Coo), Leros (Lero), Leipsoi (Lisso), Nisyros (Nisiro), Patmos (Patmo), Tilos (Piscopi), Rhodes (Rodi), Karpathos (Scarpanto), Symi (Simi), and Astypalaia (Stampalia).

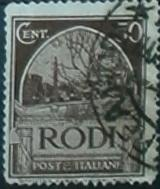
A stamp for the island of Rodi

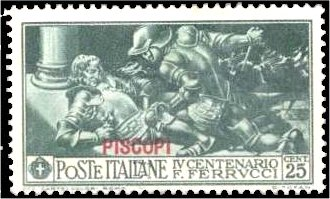
A stamp for the island of Piscopi

== Venezia Giulia issues ==
Italy annexed Venezia Giulia - including the Istrian peninsula and the cities of Trieste and Gorizia with the Treaty of Rapallo (1920). With the Treaty of Rome (1924) the city of Fiume was also annexed.

After the war, from 1945 to 1947, Venezia Giulia was occupied by Allied Anglo-American troops (Zone "A" - the territory with the city of Trieste) and troops of the Yugoslav People's Army (Zone "B" - Istria and the Slovene Littoral). The zones of occupation were demarcated along the so-called Morgan Line. In Zone A, Italian stamps were overprinted "A.M.G./V.G." (Allied Military Government/Venezia Giulia) in September 1945. In 1947, following the Paris Peace Treaties, Italy ceded most of these lands to Yugoslavia.

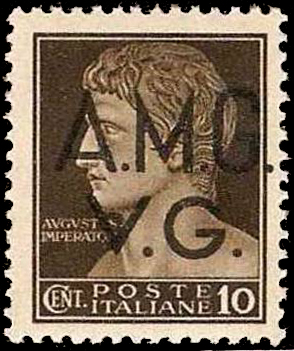
A 1945 stamp for Allied occupied Venezia Giulia

=== Free Territory of Trieste ===
The peace treaty established Trieste and the surrounding area as the Free Territory of Trieste, also divided into zones A and B, under Allied military administration and Yugoslav military administration, respectively. In Zone A, Italian stamps overprinted "A.M.G./F.T.T." were issued between 1947 and 1954. The Free Territory was divided between Italy and Yugoslavia in 1954, with Zone A joining Italy.

== Campione d'Italia issues ==
Campione d'Italia is a small Italian exclave surrounded by Switzerland near Lake Lugano. The municipal council issued its own stamps in May 1944. The stamps were inscribed "RR Poste italiane / Comune de Campione" and denominated in the Swiss currency. Campione stamps were withdrawn in 1952. Since then, mail may be sent using either Swiss stamps or Italian stamps.

== Italian post offices abroad ==
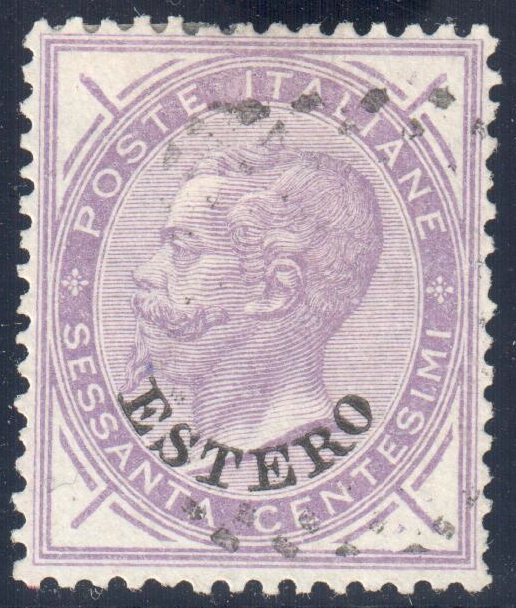
An 1874 Italian stamp for the post offices abroad

The first stamps for the Italian post offices abroad were issued on January 1, 1874, overprinting "Estero" ("Abroad") on Italian stamps.

- Italian post offices in Benghazi 1901–1912
- Italian post offices in Tripoli 1909–1912
- Italian post offices in Beijing 1917–1922
- Italian post offices in Tianjin 1917–1922
- Italian post offices in Crete
- Italian post offices in Egypt
- Italian post offices in the Ottoman Empire 1873–1923
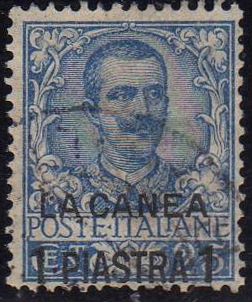
Stamp for the Italian post offices in Crete

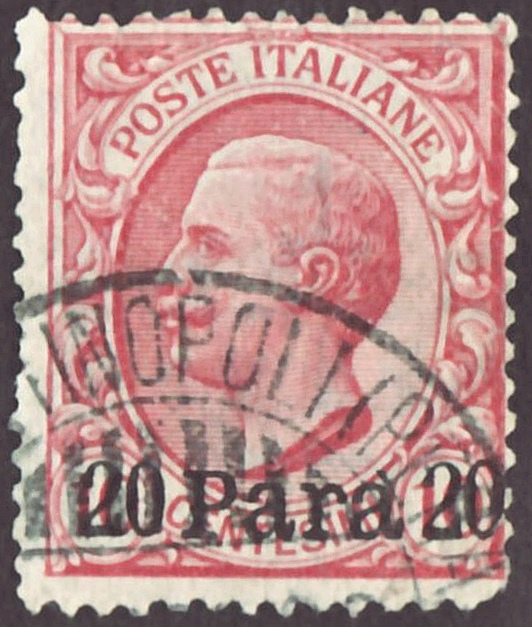
Stamp for the Italian post offices in the Ottoman Empire

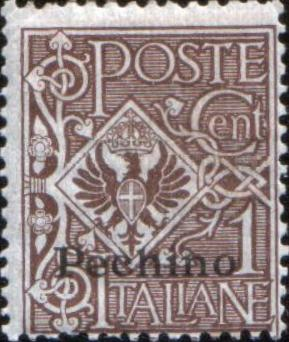
Stamp for the Italian post offices in Beijing

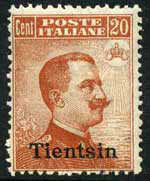
Stamp for the Italian post offices in Tianjin

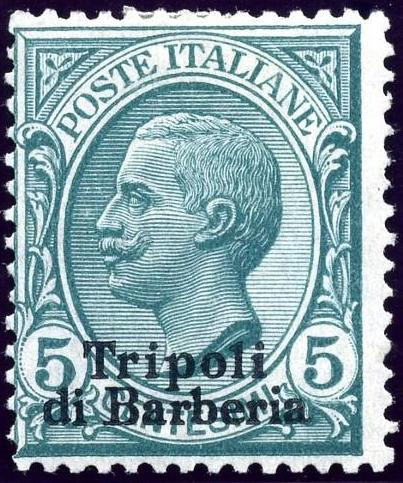
Stamp for the Italian post offices in Tripoli

== See also ==
- Revenue stamps of Italy
- Italian post in Saseno

== References and sources ==
Sources

- Dehn, Roy A. Italian Stamps: a Handbook for Collectors. London: Heinemann, 1973.
- Stanley Gibbons Ltd: various catalogues.
- Encyclopaedia of Postal Authorities
- Rossiter, Stuart & John Flower. The Stamp Atlas. London: Macdonald, 1986. ISBN 0-356-10862-7
