= Postage stamps of Italian Libya =

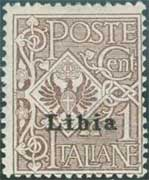
The first stamp of Italian Libya overprinted on the stamp of Italy, 1912

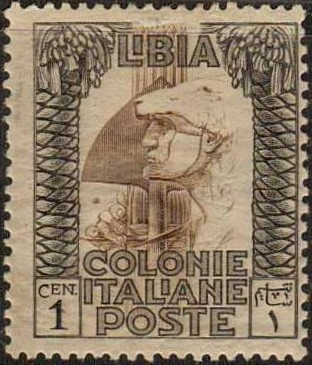
A 1921 stamp of Italian Libya showing the Roman Legionary

Postage stamps of Italian Libya were stamps issued by the Kingdom of Italy for use in Italian Libya, between 1912 and 1943.

The area now comprising Libya was originally a vilayet of the Ottoman Empire which was ceded to Italy in 1912 and became an Italian colony with its own stamps.

Stamps of Italy were overprinted Libia in 1912, and later Italian colonial issues were issued specifically for Libya. The first definitives, inscribed Libia Colonie Italiane, were issued in 1921.

All stamps of colonial Libya were printed at the Italian Government Printing Works. Some were dedicated to celebrate Italian events not related to Libya.

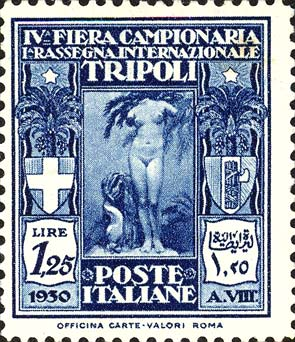
A 1930 stamp issued at the Tripoli International Fair

From 1924 to 1934 Tripolitania and Cyrenaica also had their own stamps, before being unified in 1934, with Fezzan, as the Italian colony of Libya. Stamps of Tripolitania and Cyrenaica were used concurrently with those of Italian Libya. Italian colonial issues continued until Italian Libya was overrun by the British Army during the Second World War in 1943.

Special sets inscribed "Fiera Campionaria Tripoli" were issued from 1927 to 1938 at the Fiera di Tripoli held in Tripoli.

The most famous stamps of Italian Libya are those called Panoramiche, issued mainly in the late 1930s, that show Libyan landscape and city views. There were even special stamps for "servizi" (packs, etc.).

All the stamps of Italian Libya have bilingual inscriptions (Italian and Arabic) for the denominations, even during World War II when Germans of the "Afrika Korps" complained about the Arabic.

== See also ==
- Postage stamps and postal history of Libya
- Postage stamps and postal history of Tripolitania
- Postage stamps and postal history of Cyrenaica

== Bibliography ==
- Picardi, Michele. Libia – La Serie Pittorica. Bologna: Poste Italiane, 1993 63p.
- Rossiter, Stuart & John Flower. The Stamp Atlas. London: Macdonald, 1986, p. 275. ISBN 0-356-10862-7
- Sirotti, Luigi and Nuccio Taroni. Le Occupazioni Britanniche Delle Colonie Italiane 1941–1950: storia postale. Sassone S.R.L. Roma, 2006 363p.
- Stanley Gibbons. Stanley Gibbons Stamp Catalogue Part 8 Italy & Switzerland. 6th edition. London: Stanley Gibbons, 2003 ISBN 0-85259-554-9
