= Sammarinese lira =

Currency of San Marino before 2002

lira sammarinese (Italian)
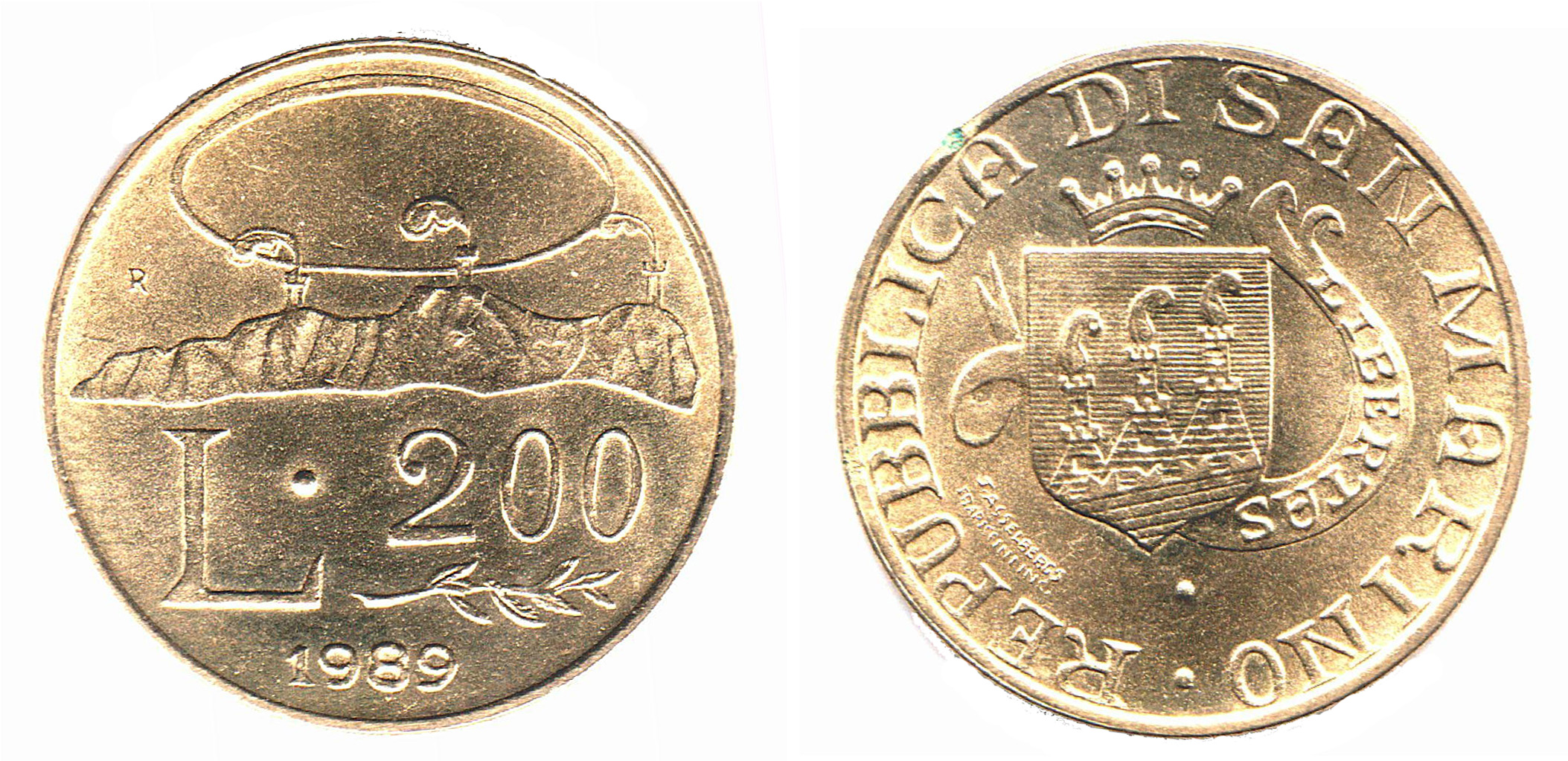
- 200 Lire Coin 1989

ISO 4217
- Code: ITL (abbreviation SML is used)

Units of account
- Base unit: lira
- Plural: lire
- Symbol: L. (None official, see Italian lira)
- Subunit
- 1/100: centesimo Subunits were abolished after WWII
- Plural
- centesimo: centesimi (c.)

Denominations
- Banknotes: Italian lira banknotes
- Coins
- Freq. used: 50, 100, 200, 500, 1,000 Lire
- Rarely used: 1 Lira, 2, 5, 10, 20 Lire

Demographics
- User(s): None, previously: Italy, San Marino, Vatican City

Issuance
- Central bank: Banca d'Italia
- Website: www.bancaditalia.it

Valuation

EU Exchange Rate Mechanism (ERM)
- Since: 25 November 1991 (Note: Indirectly (1:1 peg to ITL).)
- Withdrawn: 16 September 1992 (Black Wednesday)
- Fixed rate since: 17 August 1992
- 1 € =: 1,936.27 Lire
- This infobox shows the latest status before this currency was rendered obsolete.

The lira (plural lire; abbreviation: SML) was the currency of San Marino from the 1860s until it was replaced by the euro on 1 January 2002. It was equivalent and pegged to the Italian lira. Italian coins and banknotes and Vatican City coins were legal tender in San Marino, while Sammarinese coins, minted in Rome, were legal tender throughout Italy, as well as in the Vatican City.

== Coins ==
San Marino's first coins were copper c.5, issued in 1864. These were followed by copper c.10, first issued in 1875. Although these copper coins were last issued in 1894, silver c.50, 1 Lira, 2 Lire and 5 Lire were issued in 1898, with the 1 Lira and 2 Lire also minted in 1906.

The Sammarinese coinage recommenced in 1931, with silver 5 Lire, 10 Lire and 20 Lire, to which bronze c.5 and c.10 were added in 1935. These coins were issued until 1938.

In 1972, San Marino began issuing coins again, in denominations of 1 Lira, 2 Lire, 5 Lire, 10 Lire, 20 Lire, 50 Lire, 100 Lire and 500 Lire, all of which were struck to the same specifications as the corresponding Italian coins. 200 Lire coins were added in 1978, followed by bimetallic 500 Lire and 1,000 Lire in 1982 and 1997, respectively. 50 Lire and 100 Lire were reduced in size in 1992. All of these modern issues changed design every year.

Lire coins for San Marino discontinued after the introduction of the euro. However, San Marino has licence to—and periodically does—issue its own euro coins.

== See also ==
- Sammarinese euro coins
- Central Bank of San Marino
