= Coins of the Italian lira =

List of a Wikimedia project

Italian lira coins were the coins of the Italian lira that served as Italy's currency from 1861 until 2001 when it was replaced by the Euro.

== History ==
From 1980 until 2001, Lira 1 and Lire 2 coins were struck solely for collectors due to their low value, and in 1998 the Lire 5 was also sold for collectors only. Lire 10 and Lire 20 coins dated 2000 or 2001 were struck in sets only. The Lire 500 coin was the first bimetallic circulating coin, and was also the first circulating coin to feature Braille numerals (a Braille "L. 500" is on the upper rim of the coin's reverse, above the building).

== Chart ==
Value	Image		Specifications				Description			Minted	Usage	Common Reference
Value	Obverse	Reverse	Diameter	Thickness	Mass	Composition	Edge	Obverse	Reverse	Minted	Usage	Common Reference
c.1			15 mm	0.78mm	1 g	Bronze				(1861-1918)		
c.2			20 mm	0.8mm	2 g	Bronze				(1861-1917)		
c.5			25 mm (1861-1918), 19.5 mm (1919-1943)	1.08mm	5 g (1861-1918), 3.25 g (1919-1939), 2.95g (1939-1943)	Bronze (1861-1939), Aluminum-bronze (1939-1943)				(1861-1943)		
c.10			30 mm (1862-1867), 30.5 mm (1893-1894), 30 mm (1911), 22.5 mm (1919-1943)	1.50mm	10 g (1862-1911), 5.4 g (1919-1939), 4.7 g (1939-1943)	Bronze (1862-1939); Aluminum-bronze (1939-1943)				(1862-1943)		
c.20				1.53mm		Silver 1863-67; Copper-nickel 1894–95, 1918–20; Nickel 1908-38; Stainless steel 1939-43				1863-1943		
c.25												
c.50						Silver 1861-1892; Nickel 1919-38; Stainless steel 1939-43				1862-1943		
Lira 1						Silver 1862-1917; Nickel 1922-38; Stainless steel 1939-43; Aluminum 1946–70, 1980-2001				1862–1970, 1980-2001		
Lire 2						Silver 1862-1917; Nickel 1923-39; Stainless steel 1939-43; Aluminum 1946–70, 1980-2001				1862–1970, 1980-2001		
Lire 5						Silver 1862-1941; Gold 1863-65; Aluminum 1946-2001				1862-2001		
Lire 10						Aluminum				1951-2001		
Lire 20						Aluminum-bronze 1957–59, 1968-2001				1957-2001		
Lire 50						Stainless steel 1954-95; Copper-nickel 1996-2001				1954-2001		
Lire 100						Stainless steel 1955-92; Copper-nickel 1993-2001				1955-2001		
Lire 200						Aluminum-bronze				1977-2001		
Lire 500						Silver 1958-2001; Bi-metallic aluminum-bronze center in stainless steel ring, 1982-2001				1958-2001		
Lire 1000						Bi-metallic copper-nickel centre in aluminum-bronze ring				1997-2001		

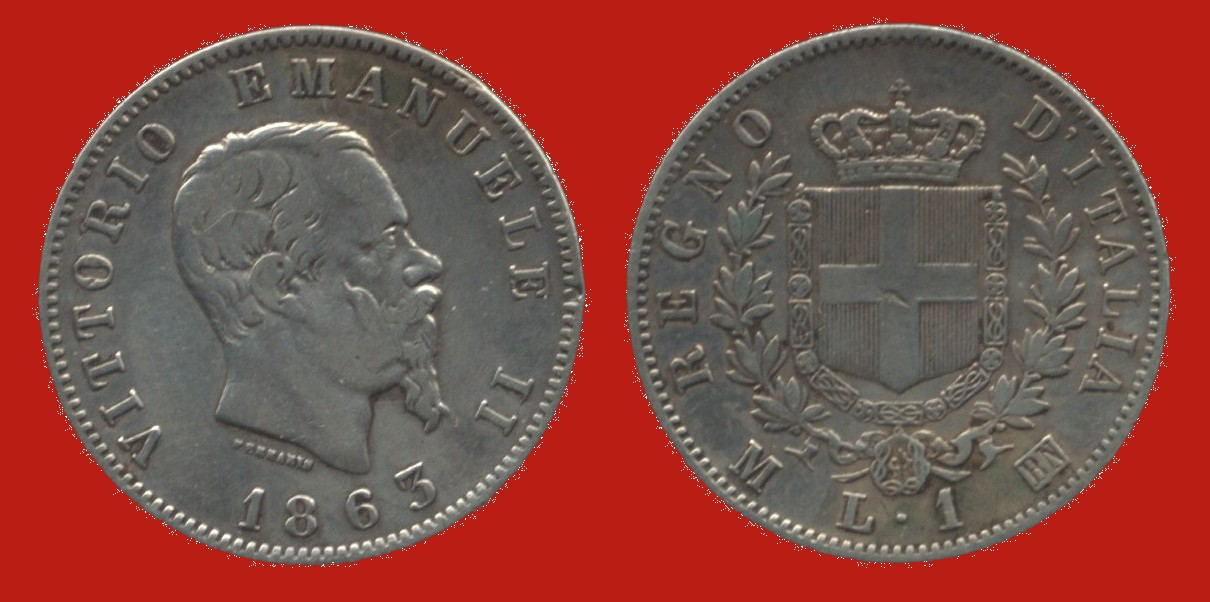
1 Italian lira 1863
Vittorio Emanuele II	Coat of arms of the House of Savoy

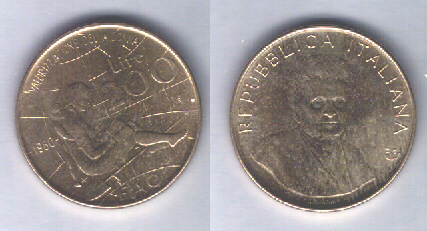
200 Italian lire Montessori
FAO's celebration	Maria Montessori

== See also ==
- History of coins in Italy
