= Postage stamps and postal history of Libya =

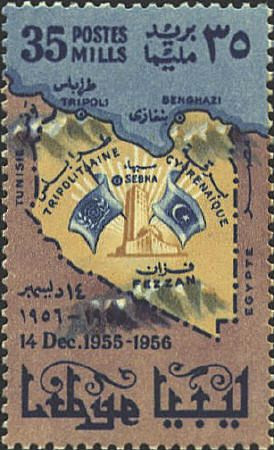
A 1956 stamp showing the provinces that came together to form modern Libya

This is a survey of the postage stamps and postal history of Libya. Libya is a country located in North Africa. Bordering the Mediterranean Sea to the north, Libya lies between Egypt to the east, Sudan to the southeast, Chad and Niger to the south, and Algeria and Tunisia to the west.

== Ottoman Empire ==
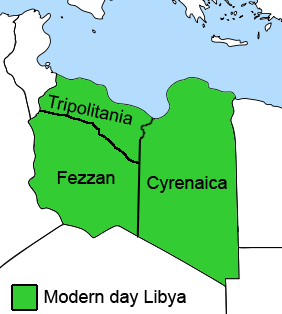
A map of Libya before unification

The first stamps used in Libya were the stamps of the Ottoman Empire.

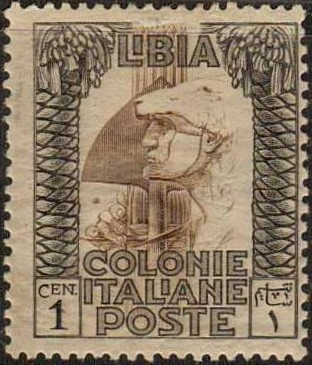
A stamp of Italian Libya showing the Roman Legionary, 1921

== Italian colony ==
The area which is now Libya was originally a vilayet of the Ottoman Empire which was ceded to Italy in 1912 and became an Italian colony.

Stamps of Italy were issued from 1912 overprinted Libia and later Italian colonial issues were issued specifically for Libya. The first definitives were issued in 1921, inscribed Libia Colonie Italiane. From 1924 to 1934 Tripolitania and Cyrenaica also had their own stamps before being unified in 1934, with Fezzan, as the Italian colony of Libya. All stamps of colonial Libya were printed at the Italian Government Printing Works.

Italian colonial issues continued until 1943 when Italian Libya was overrun by the British Army during the Second World War.

== Allied administration ==
=== British stamps ===
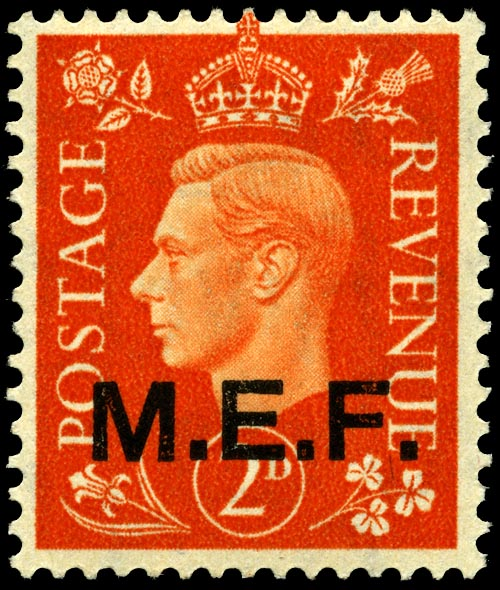
A British stamp with a Middle East Forces overprint valid for use in occupied Libya

British stamps overprinted M.E.F. (Middle East Forces) were used from 1943 to 1948 after the area was captured by the British during World War II. From 1 July 1948 stamps overprinted B.M.A. TRIPOLITANIA were used. Tripolitania only, used stamps marked B.A. TRIPOLITANIA from 6 February 1950 to December 1951.

=== Fezzan and Ghadames issues ===
Fezzan and Ghadames was a territory in the southern part of the former Italian colony of Libya controlled by the French from 1943 until Libyan independence in 1951. It was part of the Allied administration of Libya.

== Cyrenaica Emirate ==
Cyrenaica enjoyed a brief period of internal autonomy in 1949-51 when the British authorities recognised Amir Mohammed Idris Al-Senussi as Emir of Cyrenaica. Definitive and postage due stamps were issued in 1950.

== Kingdom of Libya ==
On 24 December 1951 Cyrenaica, Tripolitania and Fezzan were unified as the Kingdom of Libya.

The first stamps of the kingdom of Libya were issued on 24 December 1951 and were overprinted stamps of Cyrenaica. Three different types of overprint in three currencies were issued, for the three provinces of Cyrenaica, Tripolitania and Fezzan, reflecting the different currencies still in use in the three zones formerly administered by the Allies.

The first stamps inscribed Kingdom of Libya were issued on 15 April 1952. A variety of inscriptions were used until 1969 including Libye, Libya, Libia and United Kingdom of Libia or Libya.

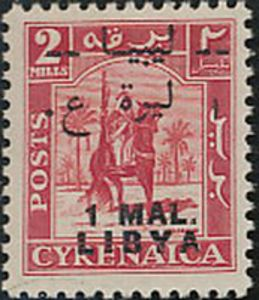
The first postage stamp of the Kingdom of Libya surcharged 1 MAL (Military Authority Lira) on a stamp of Cyrenaica, 1951

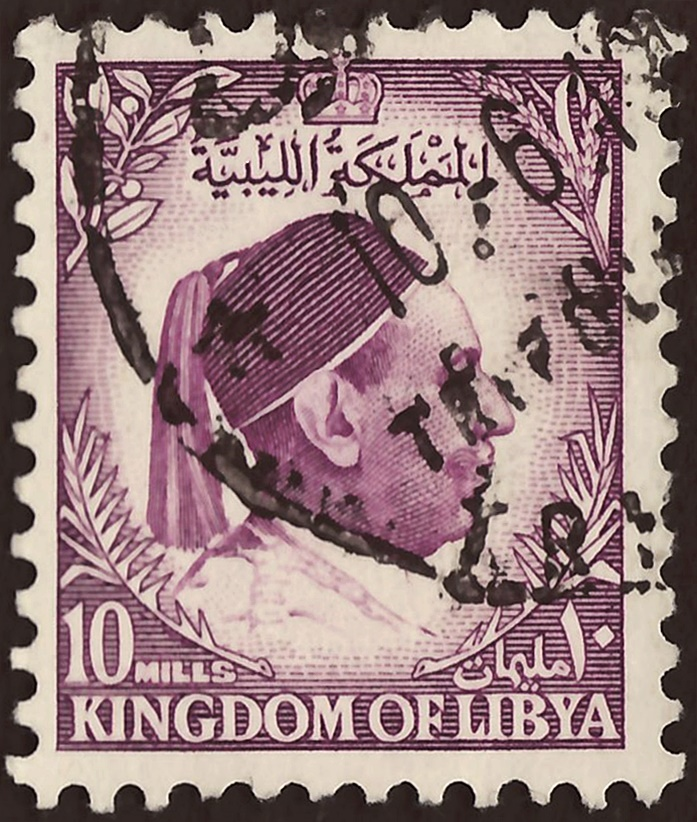
A 1952 stamp of the Kingdom of Libya

== Libyan Arab Republic ==
In 1969 King Idris I was deposed in a military coup and stamps including the word Kingdom were altered in a variety of ways to delete that word. Stamps were first issued marked L.A.R. then LAR and from the 1970s began to be inscribed Socialist People's Libyan Arab Jamahiriya with equivalent wording in Arabic.

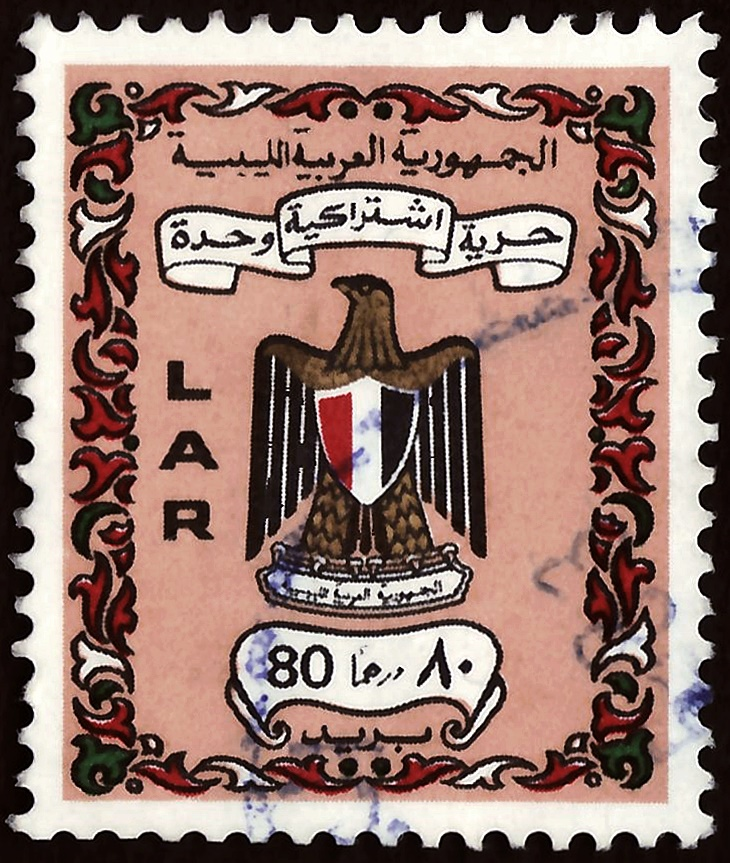
A 1972 stamp inscribed LAR

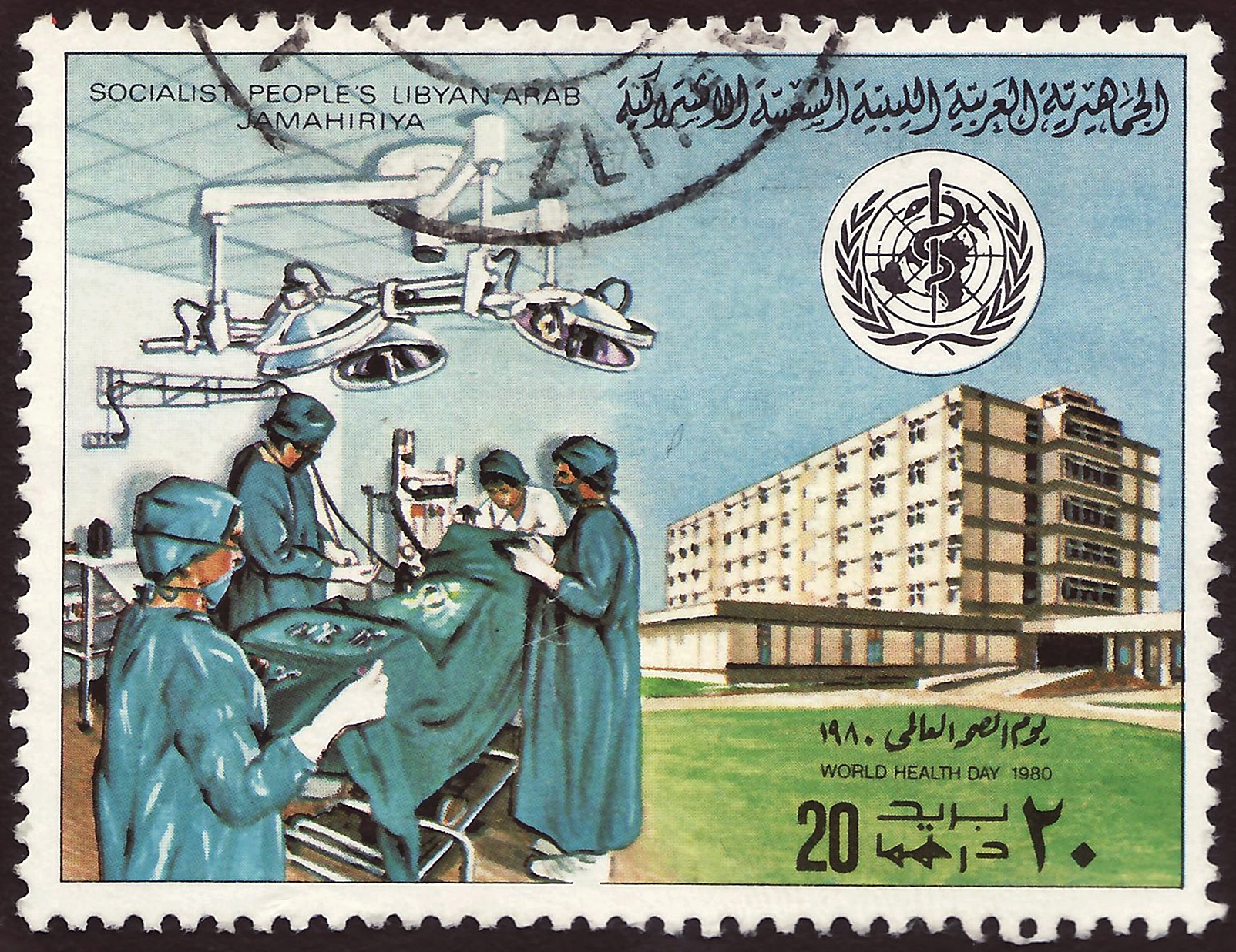
A 1980 stamp inscribed Socialist People's Libyan Arab Jamahiriya

== See also ==
- Davies Collection A collection of Libyan revenue stamps for 1955 to 1969.
- General Posts and Telecommunications Company
- Postage stamps of Italian Libya
- Postage stamps and postal history of Cyrenaica
- Postage stamps and postal history of Tripolitania
- Postage stamps and postal history of Fezzan and Ghadames
- Revenue stamps of Libya
