= Postage stamps and postal history of Tripolitania =

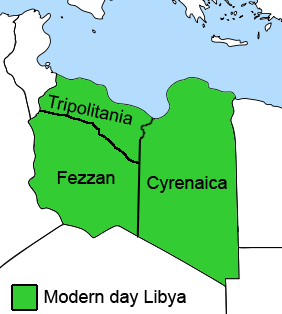
A map showing the location of Tripolitania

This is a survey of the postage stamps and postal history of Tripolitania, now part of Libya.

Tripolitana is a historic region of western Libya, centered on the coastal city of Tripoli. Formerly part of the Ottoman Empire, Tripolitania was captured by Italy in 1911 during the Italo-Turkish War. Italy officially granted autonomy after the war, but gradually occupied the region. Originally administered as part of a single colony, Tripolitania was a separate colony from 26 June 1927 to 1934, when it was merged into "Libya". During World War II, Libya was occupied by the Allies and until 1947 Tripolitania (and the region of Cyrenaica) were administered by Great Britain. Italy formally renounced its claim upon the territory in the same year.

== Italian post office in Tripoli ==
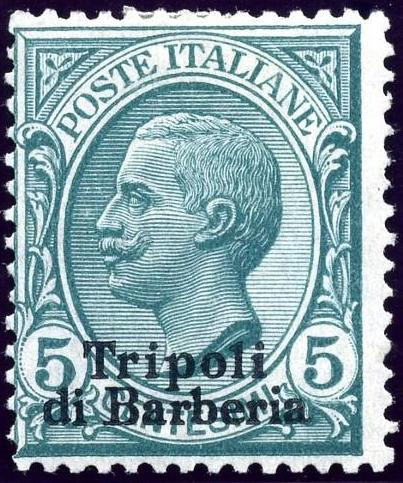
A stamp of Italy overprinted "Tripoli di Barberia" for use in Italian post office in Tripoli, 1909

An Italian post office was opened in Tripoli in 1869. in 1909 stamps were issued for use in the Tripoli post office.

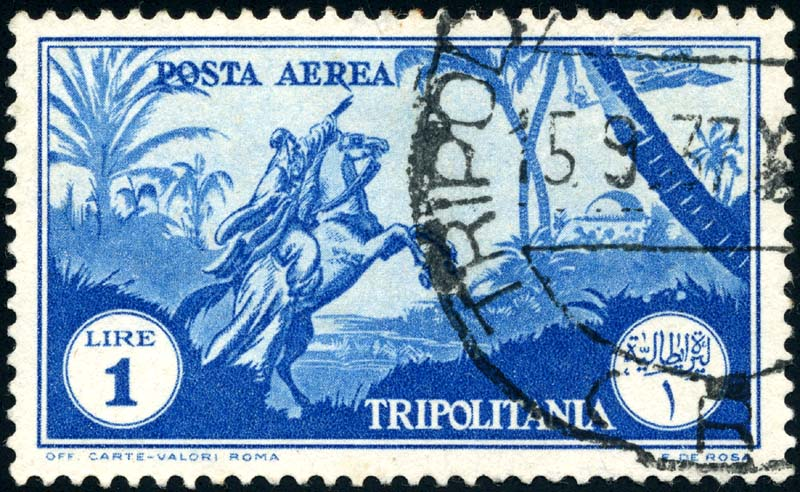
A 1931 airmail stamp of Tripolitania, depicting an Arab horseman pointing to an airplane passing overhead, cancelled in 1937

== Italian Tripolitania ==
The Ottoman Empire ceded Tripolitania to Italy in 1912. From 1923 to 1934 stamps were issued for Tripolitania, which were used concurrently with those of Italian Libya.

The first stamps of Tripolitania were Italian "Propagation of the Faith" stamps overprinted TRIPOLITANIA issued on 24 October 1923 at the same time as those for Cyrenaica.

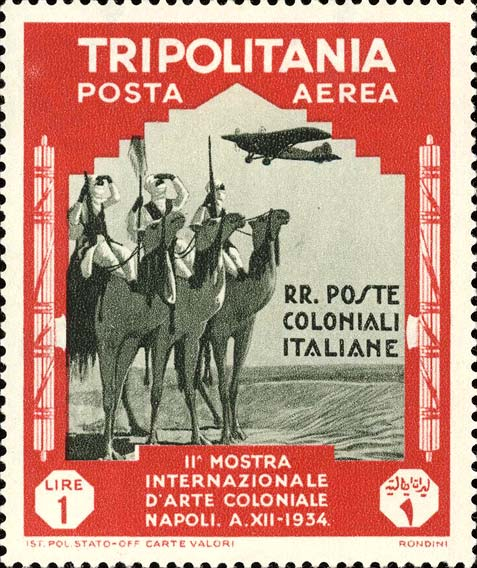
A 1934 stamp marking the 2nd Colonial Arts Exhibition in Naples

The first stamps inscribed for the colony were the semi-postal "Colonial Institute issue" in 1926, followed by several sets of airmail stamps, from 1931 to 1933. October 1934 saw the only regular Tripolitanian stamps issued, a set of six (along with six more airmail) promoting the 2nd Colonial Arts Exhibition. In 1934 Tripolitania, Cyrenaica and Fezzan were united as the Italian colony of Libya.

All stamps of colonial Tripolitania were printed at the Italian Government Printing Works.

Genuinely used stamps of Tripolitania (fake cancels are common) are valued at about twice as much as unused stamps.

== British stamps ==
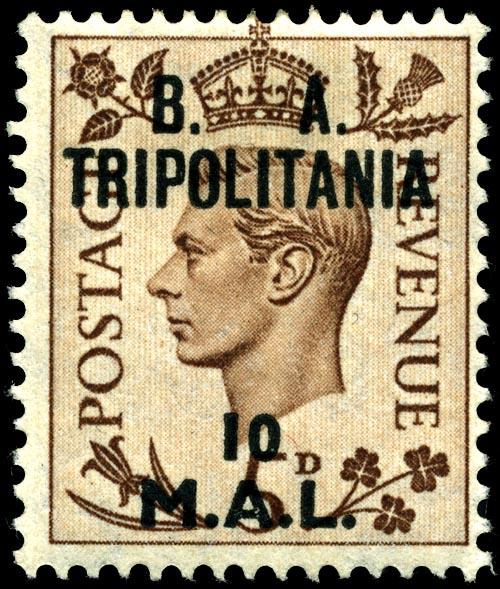
A British stamp overprinted "B.A. TRIPOLITANIA", 1950

British stamps overprinted M.E.F. (Middle East Forces) were used from 1943 to 1948 after the area was captured by the British during World War II. From 1 July 1948 stamps overprinted B.M.A. TRIPOLATANIA were used. From 6 February 1950 to December 1951 the stamps were overprinted B.A. TRIPOLITANIA.

== Kingdom of Libya ==
On 24 December 1951, Cyrenaica, Tripolitania and Fezzan were unified as the Kingdom of Libya under Amir Mohammed Idris Al-Senussi. After unification, stamps of Libya were used.

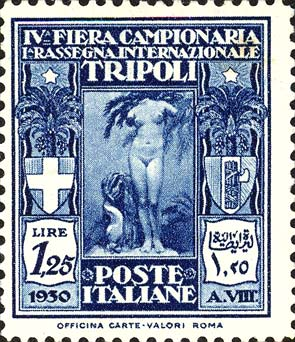
A 1930 stamp issued at the Tripoli International Fair

== Tripoli International Fair issues ==
From 1927 to 1938, special sets inscribed "Fiera Campionaria Tripoli" were issued at the Tripoli International Fair.

== See also ==
- Postage stamps of Italian Libya
- Postage stamps and postal history of Libya
- Postage stamps and postal history of Cyrenaica

== References & sources ==
  - Encyclopaedia of Postal Authorities
