= Davies Collection =

Collection of Libyan revenue stamps

The Davies Collection is a collection of Libyan revenue stamps from 1955 to 1969, formed from material from the Bradbury Wilkinson Archive, and presented to the British Library Philatelic Collections by John Neville Davies in 1992.

== John Davies ==
John Davies (born 1935) stated that he began to collect stamps on 2 September 1940 when his mother paid a bill for £2 and received a receipt bearing a stamp from the British Postal Centenary set of that year which showed both Queen Victoria and King George VI. The stamp was to pay the tax on receipts then current and was therefore used as a revenue stamp.

Davies became interested in Libyan stamps while carrying out his national service in Libya between 1954 and 1956, though he bought little material at that time. From 1956 he was able to develop his collection by buying Libyan postal history and postage stamps which no one else seemed interested in. In some cases he was able to buy almost the complete Libyan stock of dealers such as Urch Harris and Proud Bailey who had no other buyers for the material. He left the Army in 1963 and worked subsequently at the British Post Office (1967 –1986) in the Controller's Office and the National Postal Museum. In 1986 he became a curator at the British Library where he was assistant to David Beech. He retired in 1993. Davies is a former Fellow of the Royal Philatelic Society London.

== The Collection ==
In 1991, the printers Bradbury Wilkinson sold part of their archive including revenue stamps produced for the government of Libya from 1955 to 1969. The whole of that part of the archive was purchased personally by John Davies. The archive was in poor condition and required extensive conservation work.

The material purchased by Davies was composed solely of file copies of the final issued revenue stamps produced by Bradbury Wilkinson for the Kingdom period. Most of the stamps were for consular fees and all were gummed and unused. All were in full sheets of 10 x 10 although some had become part separated through poor storage. No proofs, essays, specimens or similar material was included, nor was any material from after the 1969 Libyan Revolution.

In 1992, Davies donated horizontal strips of five of each stamp to the British Library. The balance of the archive was retained by Davies and none has been sold as of July 2011. No mint examples of the stamps in the archive have been reported and none should be available on the philatelic market. The only mint examples known are in the British Library collection and those retained personally by Davies.

The stamps include requisition (order) numbers in the selvedge but the numbers of each stamp printed are not known as the Bradbury Wilkinson requisition books showing that information are missing.

== See also ==
- Postage stamps and postal history of Libya
- Revenue stamps of Libya
