= Alessandro Limongelli =

Italian architect (1890–1932)

- Born: 7 July 1890; Cairo, Egypt
- Died: 26 February 1932 (aged 41); Tripoli, Libya
- Education: Accademia di Belle Arti di Roma
- Occupation: Architect

Alessandro Limongelli (7 July 1890 – 26 February 1932) was an Italian architect known for his work on monumental commemorative buildings, urban planning projects, and colonial architecture.

== Life and career ==
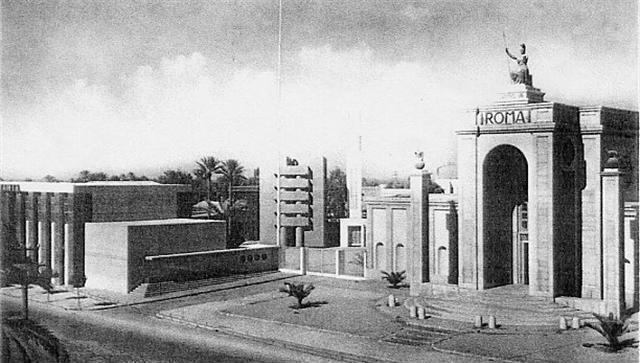
The Rome Pavilion in Tripoli

Limongelli was born on 7 July 1890 in Cairo, Egypt, to a family of Apulian origin. He studied at the Accademia di Belle Arti in Rome, graduating around 1912. Among his mentors were Giovanni Battista Milani and Gustavo Giovannoni, the latter becoming a major influence on his architectural approach.

In 1920, Limongelli gained recognition through his projects for the Italian War Memorial at San Michele. Between 1924 and 1928, he worked on several commemorative and residential projects in Rome, including the Arc de Triomphe to fallen soldiers in Genoa (1924), and housing complexes in Piazza Perin del Vaga and Via Gargano (1924–1927). His architectural style emphasized classical proportions, simplicity of volumes, and restrained decorative elements, reflecting a study of ancient architecture rather than contemporary stylistic trends.

In 1927, Limongelli joined the architecture section of the Ufficio Piano Regolatore at the Governatorate of Rome, contributing to urban planning projects. He traveled extensively in Egypt and Libya, which influenced his approach to monumental and colonial architecture.

From 1928 to 1932, he was active in Tripoli, where he designed the Rome Pavilion for the Tripoli International Fair, the triumphal arch and royal tribune for the Italian monarchy's visit, and several urban planning proposals. His work in Libya aimed to reconcile classical Roman principles with the local context, climate, and culture.

Limongelli died on 26 February 1932 in Tripoli. In 1933, the Italian Fascist Architects' Syndicate held a retrospective exhibition of his work at the Galleria Nazionale d'Arte Moderna in Rome.

== Sources ==
- Cantatore, F. (1996). "Alessandro Limongelli". In Cicconcelli, C. (ed.). Teoria dell'architettura. Rome. pp. 143–149.
- Cecchelli, C. (1927). "Profili di giovani architetti: Alessandro Limongelli". Architettura e arti decorative. VII (3). Rome: 113–131.
- Ficorilli, Gianluca (2005). "LIMONGELLI, Alessandro". Dizionario Biografico degli Italiani. Vol. 65. Rome: Istituto dell'Enciclopedia Italiana.
- Gresleri, Giuliano; Masseretti, Pier Giorgio; Zagnoni, Stefano, eds. (1993). Architettura italiana d'oltremare 1870-1940. Venice: Marsilio. pp. 37, 270, 273, 374.
- Strappa, Giuseppe, ed. (1989). Tradizione e innovazione nell'architettura di Roma capitale. 1870–1930. Rome: Kappa. pp. 118–121, 139–141.
