= Postage stamps and postal history of Cyrenaica =

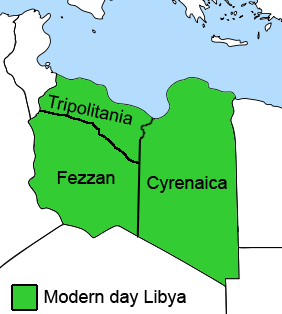
A map showing the location of Cyrenaica

This is a survey of the postage stamps and postal history of Cyrenaica, now part of Libya.

Cyrenaica is the eastern coastal region of Libya and also an ex-province or state ("muhafazah" or "wilayah") of the country (alongside Tripolitania and Fezzan) in the pre-1963 administrative system. What used to be Cyrenaica in the old system is now divided up into several "shabiyat" (see administrative divisions in Libya). In addition to the coastal region, i.e. historical Cyrenaica, the former province, during the Kingdom and the Italian era extended to the south to include the entire eastern section of the country.

== Italian post office in Benghazi ==
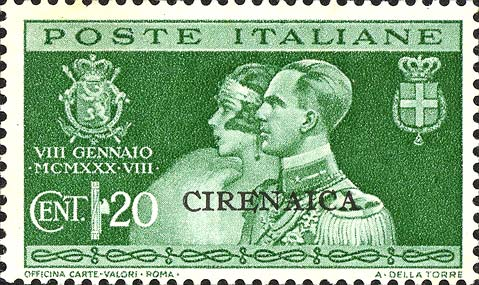
A 1930 stamp of Cyrenaica while it was an Italian colony

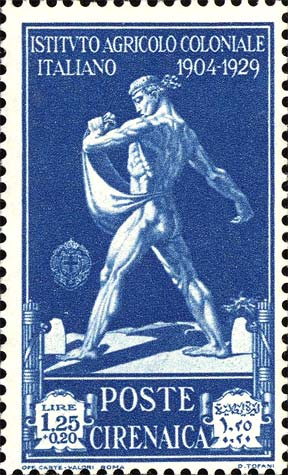
A 1930 semi-postal stamp of Cyrenaica

An Italian post office was opened in Benghazi in 1901 and the stamps of Italy were overprinted for use in the post office.

== Italian Cyrenaica ==
The Ottoman Empire ceded Cyrenaica to Italy in 1912. From 1923 to 1934 stamps were issued for Cyrenaica, which were used concurrently with those of Italian Libya. The first stamps of Cyrenaica were Italian stamps overprinted CIRENAICA issued on 24 October 1923 at the same time as those for Tripolitania.

Semi-postal stamps inscribed Cirenaica were issued in 1926, and regular commemorative and definitive stamp issues continued until 1934 when Tripolitania, Cyrenaica and Fezzan were united as the Italian colony of Libya.

Stamps of colonial Cyrenaica were inscribed Cirenaica and printed at the Italian Government Printing Works.

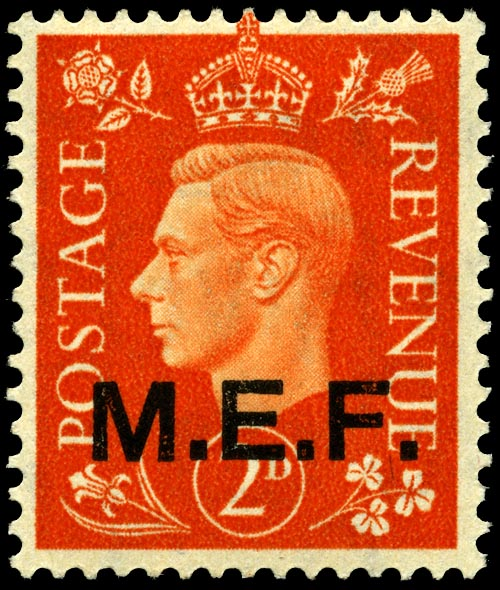
A British stamp overprinted "M.E.F." valid for use in Cyrenaica

== British stamps ==
British stamps overprinted M.E.F. (Middle East Forces) were used from 1943 to 1948 after the area was captured by the British during World War II. From 1 July 1948 stamps overprinted "B.M.A. TRIPOLITANIA" were used.

== Emirate of Cyrenaica ==
1950 postage due stamps issued by the Emirate of Cyrenaica

Cyrenaica enjoyed a brief period of internal autonomy in 1949-51 when the British authorities recognised Amir Mohammed Idris Al-Senussi as Emir of Cyrenaica, which ended on 24 December 1951 when Cyrenaica, Tripolitania and Fezzan were unified as the Kingdom of Libya. Definitive and postage due stamps were issued in 1950. After unification, stamps of Libya were used.

== See also ==
- Postage stamps of Italian Libya
- Postage stamps and postal history of Libya
- Postage stamps and postal history of Tripolitania
