= Revenue stamps of Italy =

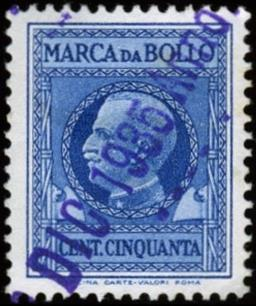
An Italian revenue stamp used in 1935

The Italian revenue stamp, referred to as a "marca da bollo" in Italian, is a revenue stamp that has been used in Italy beginning in 1863 as payment for the validation of acts and public documents (for example, notarial acts, statements, passports, etc.).

An Italian revenue stamp for passports, referred to as a "marca da bollo per passaporto" in Italian (or, more properly, "concessione governativa passaporto"), is required for the issuance of a passport. Whereas the revenue stamp was to be affixed into the passport (and another one put in every year only if the passport was used outside the EU), nowadays only one "marca" is required and it is used on the passport request form.

These stamps are generally sold in tobacconists or in authorized public places.

== Replacement of stamps by stickers ==
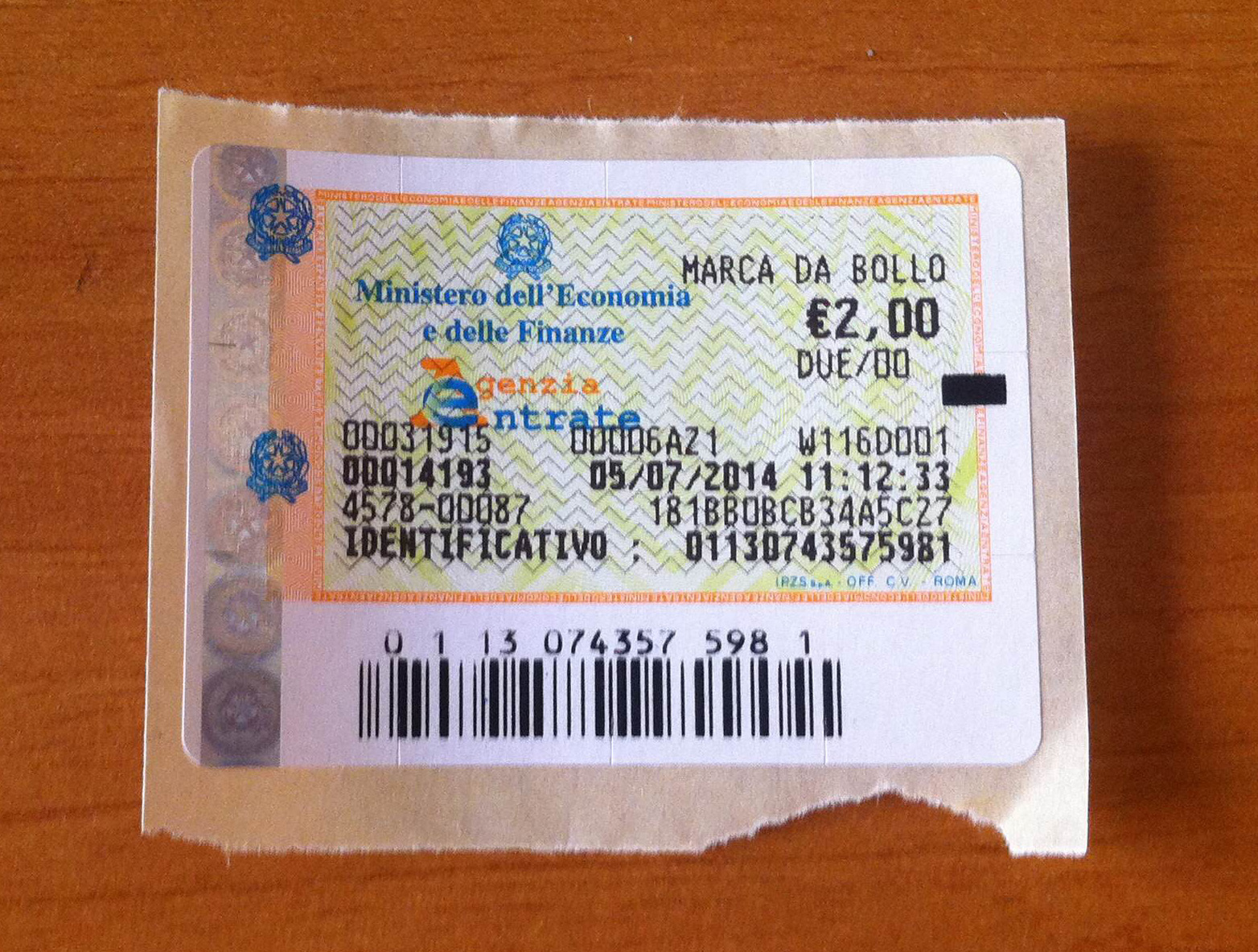
Italian sticker revenue stamp, 2014

Since June 2005 the stamps have been replaced by stickers, issued by telematics from the Italian revenue agency, Agenzia delle Entrate, at the point of sale. The stickers replaced the stamps on September 1, 2007.

People who still had the older stamps on that date were not able to subsequently use them because of the change to adhesive stickers and the older stamps are not presently refundable. Due to prior purchasing of the stamps in large quantities, some businesses suffered fiscal damage because they purchased the stamps shortly before the changeover to stickers.

The requirement to purchase physical revenue stamps or stickers annually was eliminated on 24 June 2014 It was replaced with an electronic duty system from 2015 onward. This program is expected to eventually be eliminated to bring Italy's passport management system in line with EU partners who generally do not require such payments.

== See also ==
- Postage stamps and postal history of Italy
