= Tripoli International Fair =

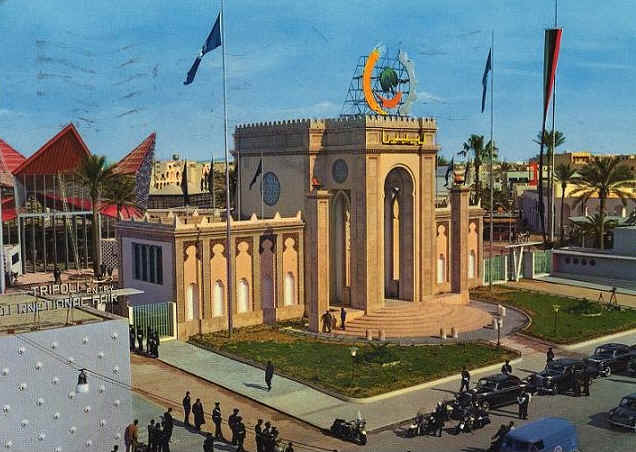
Tripoli International Fair in 1966

Tripoli International Fair (TIF) (Arabic: معرض طرابلس الدولي, romanized: Maarad Tarables A'Dawli) is an annual commercial exhibition and trade event taking place in Tripoli, Libya. It involves participants from North Africa and is organized by The General Board of Fairs (GBF).

== History ==
The Tripoli International Fair was founded by the Italian government in 1927 and is considered to be the oldest Trade Fair in Africa.

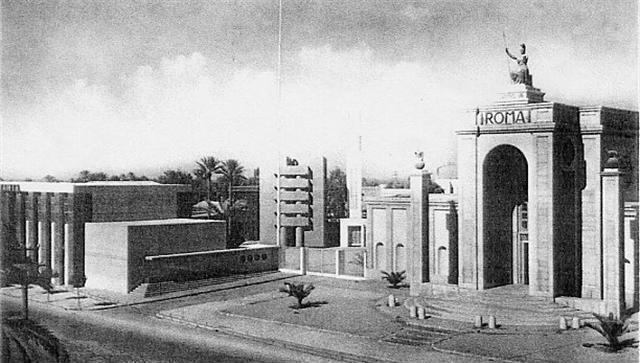
Fiera internazionale di Tripoli in 1939

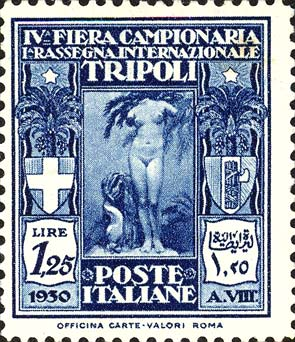
Stamp celebrating the 1930 TIF

The Fiera internazionale di Tripoli was one of the main international "Fairs" in the colonial world in the 1930s, and was internationally promoted together with the Tripoli Grand Prix as a showcase of Italian Libya.

The most notable building at the fair is the symbolic monument at the entrance, known as the "Padiglione del governatorato di Roma alla fiera di Tripoli" or the Pavilion of Rome in Tripoli, which was originally designed by Egyptian born - Italian Architect Alessandro Limongelli.

The 1934 TIF was famous worldwide because done with the first air trip in the Libyan Sahara's oasis, and an Italian stamp celebrated the event.

After World War II the Fair was opened again, but greatly reduced in size. The 2008 session of TIF took place between 2 and 12 April 2008 and is again enjoying its former international importance. In 2010 there were more than 1,000 Arab and European/American participants, from 29 countries.

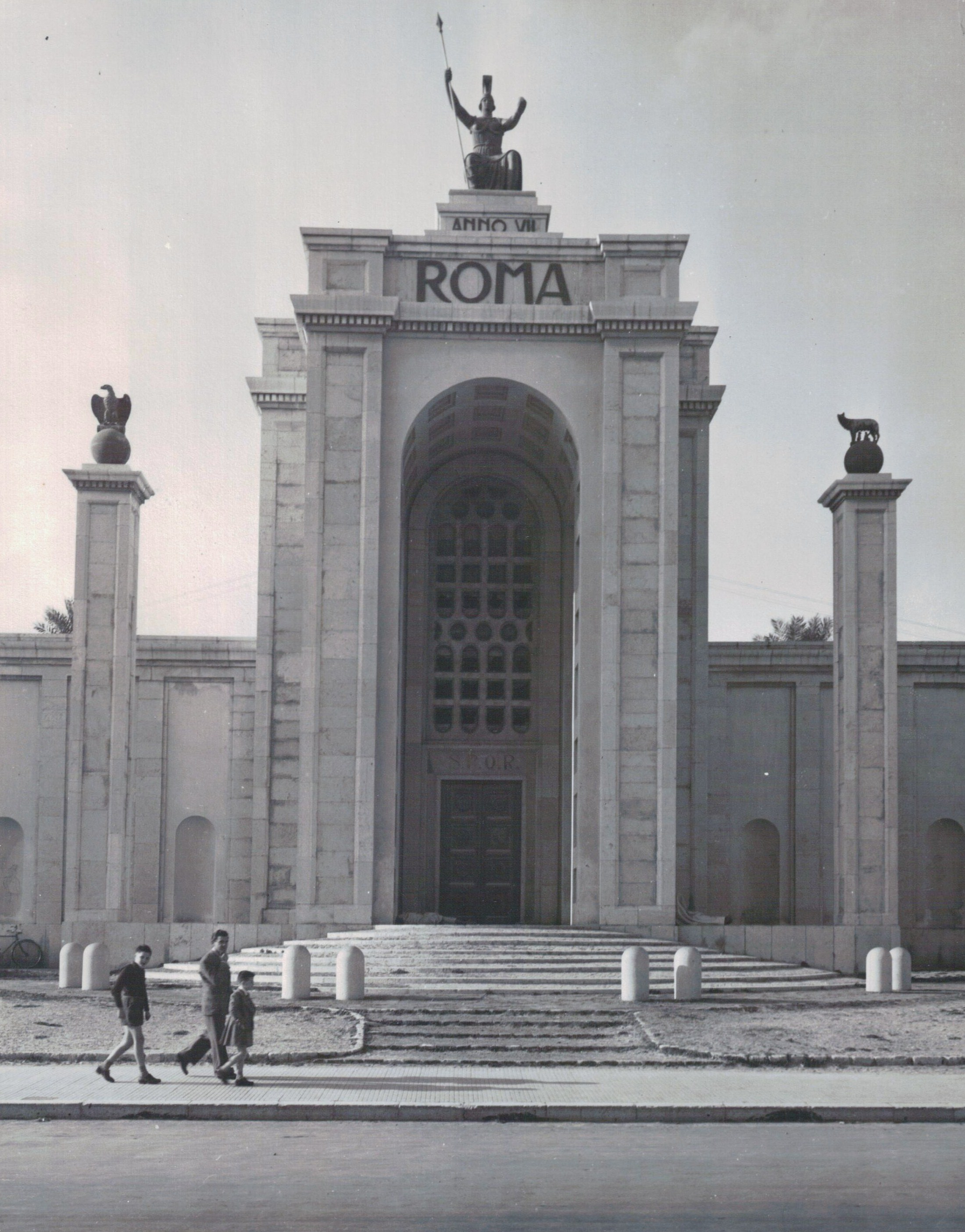
Tripoli International Fair in 1950

== See also ==
- Tripoli Fair Tournament
- Tripoli Grand Prix
- Italian Libya
- Italian settlers in Libya
- Expo Libya

== Bibliography ==
- Brian L. McLaren (2002). "The Tripoli Trade Fair and the Representation of Italy's African Colonies". Journal of Decorative and Propaganda Arts. 24.
