= 1 Centesimo (Italian coin) =

Former Italian coin

1 cent
- Kingdom of Italy
- Value: 0.01 Italian lira
- Mass: 1 g
- Diameter: 15 mm
- Edge: Smooth
- Composition: Bronze
- Years of minting: 1861–1918

Obverse
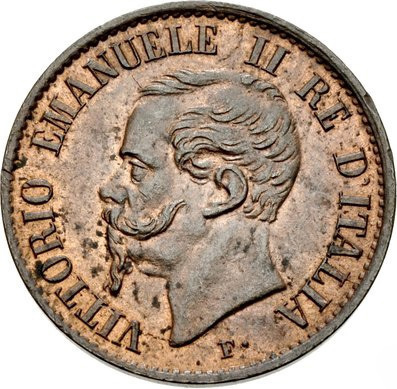
- Design: Head of the King of Italy, in the exergue the authors' initials

Reverse
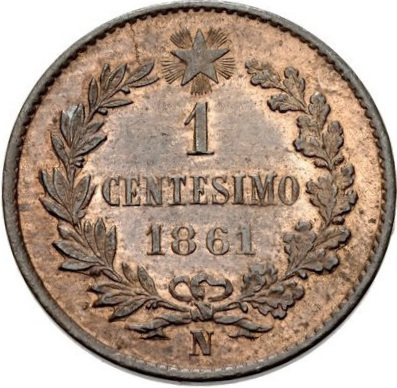
- Design: 1 centesimo, between laurel and oak branches tied at bottom with a bow. At the top the star of Italy and in the exergue the mintmark

The 1 lira cent (Italian: centesimo di lira), commonly called centesimino, was the smallest denomination of Italian lira coins. Like the contemporary 1, 2 and 5 cent coins, it was made of a bronze alloy composed of 960‰ copper and 40‰ tin. The 1-cent coins were minted between 1861 and 1918, only to be withdrawn from circulation in 1924.

== Origin ==
=== Napoleonic monetary reform ===
1 centesimo
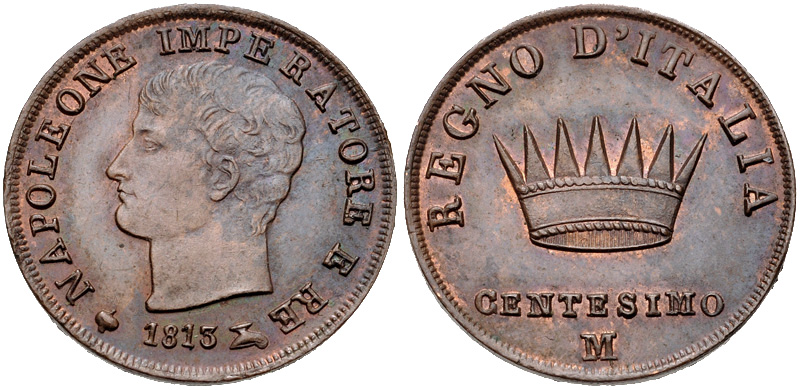
First side of the image: napoleone imperatore e re effigy of Napoleon
Second side of the image: regno d'italia, crown, in exergue centesimo
1813, Cu 950‰, 2,1 g

In order to bring order to the French monetary system, on August 15, 1795, the National Convention introduced the use of the decimal base and bimetallism, a system that was not implemented until 1803 by Napoleon. The silver franc was adopted as the basic unit; multiples worth more than 5 francs were minted in gold, while copper was allowed to be used for cents. Following the Italian campaign led by Napoleon, the Kingdom of Italy was born in 1805, which, being a de facto French dependency, assumed the new decimal-based monetary system.

The Italian lira was then created, a currency totally equivalent to the French franc and therefore usable in both France and Italy. The coin, which represented the hundredth part of the lira, was minted starting in 1807 in the mints of Bologna, Venice and Milan, which in particular also became the mint where all the coinage of the kingdom was prepared. The coin weighed 2.1 g, had a diameter of 19.5 mm and was composed of a 950‰ copper alloy.

The cent was officially minted until 1813, but its issuance probably continued after the Battle of Waterloo; due to the lack of new coinage, the Austrians continued to use the Milan mint until 1819 to issue the Napoleonic copper and silver coins.

=== The Restoration ===
With the restoration of the European monarchies, Napoleonic reforms were also abolished in the monetary sphere. The Austrian Empire, which ruled northern Italy with the Lombardy-Venetia Kingdom, replaced the Napoleonic lira with the Austrian lira, a currency in dual circulation and pegged to the Austrian florin. Like the florin, the new lira did not follow the decimal base: its multiples were the scudo and the sovereign, worth 6 and 40 Austrian lira, respectively. Despite this, the submultiples of the lira followed the decimal base; just as the florin was divided into 100 soldi, the lira also consisted of 100 cents. Due to this monetary system, starting in 1822 in the mints of Milan and Venice, the minting of 1-cent coins of the Austrian lira, which had different measurements from the Napoleonic ones, was started. These coins entered circulation following a regime of forced tender; therefore, it was not possible to convert them into gold or silver, and furthermore, payment between private individuals with this currency was limited to a quarter of a lira.

1 centesimo
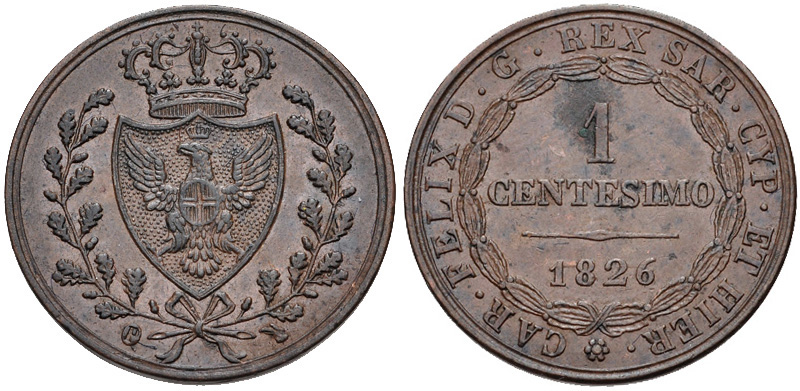
First side of the image: Coat of arms of the Kingdom of Sardinia among oak branches
Second side of the image: car·felix d·g·rex sar·cyp·et hier·1 centesimo
1826, Cu 950‰, 2,0 g

Despite the Restoration and the abolition of the Napoleonic reforms, some Italian states continued to use the decimal monetary system; among them was the Kingdom of Sardinia under Victor Emmanuel I. In the Kingdom of Sardinia, the minting of 1 lira cent copper coins began in 1826 under Charles Felix; the coin had different characteristics from the Napoleonic coin: it weighed 2 g and had a diameter of 19 mm. During the reign of Charles Albert, between February 22, 1847, and May 15, 1848, Carlo Felice's coinage was reused to make up for the lack of loose change, while with Victor Emmanuel II no coins of this denomination were issued until the founding of the Kingdom of Italy. In 1842, 1-cent coins of 15 mm in diameter and 1 g in weight were minted for circulation in Sardinia, measures that would later be adopted in what would become the Kingdom of Italy.

In addition to the Kingdom of Sardinia, the Duchy of Parma and Piacenza also retained the Napoleonic decimal system, and in 1830, during the reign of Marie Louise of Austria, 2029360 1-cent coins were minted with the same characteristics as those of the Kingdom of Sardinia. This coin was also minted in 1854 with the effigy of Charles III in only 300000 examples, of which 20 are supposed to have survived.

=== The unification of Italy ===
When the revolution of 1848 was over, the Lombardy-Venetia Kingdom came under the rule of the revolutionaries, and the Provisional Government of Milan and the Republic of San Marco were born. Following these events, the Kingdom of Sardinia began the first war of independence, and the two newly formed revolutionary governments replaced the Austrian lira with a new coinage based on the Savoy lira. In particular, the Republic of San Marco, with Decree No. 565 of January 15, 1849, minted 2760000 1-cent coins of the current lira in the Venice mint, with different measurements than the Savoy lira; the coin, although made of copper, was 18 mm in diameter and weighed 1 g. The Risorgimento came into full swing when the insurgent Legation of Romagne between 1859 and 1860, in order to avoid continuing to use the papal coinage, began minting 1-cent coins reusing Carlo Felice's old 1826 coinage. The provisional government of Tuscany also minted new coinage and so in 1860 commissioned the Ralph Heaton Firm of Birmingham to mint new 1-cent coins bearing the year 1859, using the Sardinian format of 1842.

== Kingdom of Italy ==
=== Victor Emmanuel II ===
Following the Second War of Independence and the union of Lombardy with the Kingdom of Sardinia, which took place on November 10, 1859, with the Treaty of Zurich, Victor Emmanuel II's finance minister, Giovanni Battista Oytana, intervened in order to unify the Italian monetary system. With the issuance of Royal Decree No. 3773 of November 20, 1859, it was decreed that the pre-unification copper and bronze coins be withdrawn from circulation and replaced with new 1, 2 and 5 cent coins bearing the portrait of Victor Emmanuel II on the obverse. This decree also stipulated that the new coins should contain at least 95 percent copper, although the correct composition was later established by the December 15, 1860, Lieutenancy Decree, which mandated the use of a bronze alloy composed of 960‰ copper and 40‰ tin. The document also decided on the size of the 1-cent coin, which was to have a diameter of 15 mm and a weight of 1 g.

With the proclamation of the Kingdom of Italy, the new 1-cent bronze coins, engraved by Giuseppe Ferraris and depicting Victor Emmanuel II, became legal tender on August 1, 1861, and until November 1, 1862, they operated under a dual circulation system. Bronze coins could be exchanged by the state in unlimited quantities, while payments between private individuals were not allowed to exceed the value of 1 lira. The minting of 1-cent coins, in spite of the reported date (1861), did not begin until 1862, and these were struck by the Milan and Naples mints, which minted many with the correct 1862 date. The coins of the Neapolitan mint generally have a worn-out mintage and an impression of the obverse on the reverse; in addition, their weight varies between 1.02 g, for those dated 1861 and 0.99 g for those dated 1862. These slight dissimilarities in weight can also be seen in the later mintages of Umberto I and Victor Emmanuel III. Among those minted in Milan, an extremely rare variant (R4) was found, bearing an upside-down M instead of the usual mintmark. Other 1-cent coins were later minted in 1868 by the Milan and Turin mints, although they bear the date 1867.

=== Umberto I ===
With the death of Victor Emmanuel II on January 9, 1878, the eldest son Umberto I became king of Italy. According to reports in the 1891 Italian Numismatic Magazine, the minting of 1-cent coins with the effigy of Victor Emmanuel II continued even during the reign of Umberto I; it is estimated that the Milan mint minted 23500000 1-cent coins dated 1867 between 1883 and 1892, excluding the years 1884 and 1890.

For this reason, the minting of 1-cent coins depicting Umberto I and engraved by Filippo Speranza began only from 1895, when the lack of 1, 2 and 5 cent coins in circulation was recognized. The issuance of these coins was regulated by a decree of October 13, 1894, which stipulated the withdrawal and demonetization of 15175384 of worn-out 10-cent coins in order to mint new 1, 2 and 5-cent coins for the same value at the Rome Mint. The 1-cent coin with the effigy of Umberto I was minted annually until 1900 (excluding 1898), the year of the king's assassination; in particular, in this year the minting of 1000000 10-cent coins was again authorized in order to mint new 1-cent coins.

=== Victor Emmanuel III ===
Drachma for Egypt
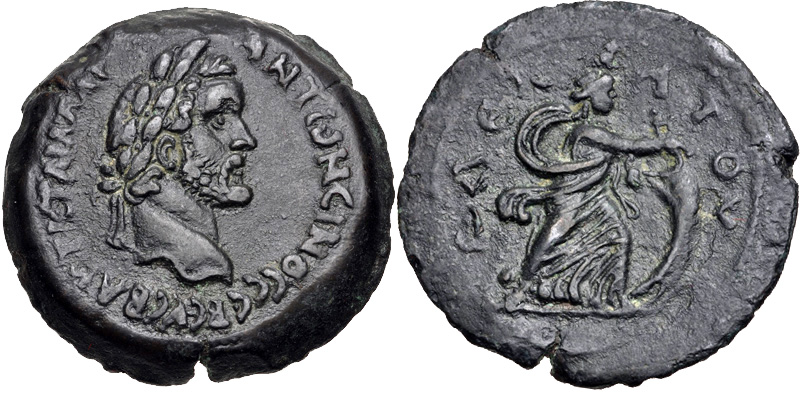
First side of the image: avt k t aiλ aδp antѡnєinoc cєb єvcb around the laureate head of the emperor Antoninus Pius
Second side of the image: l δєk-atov around the goddess Isis Faria on the bow of a sailing ship
146-147 AD, bronze, 28.88 g

Less than a year after the new king's coronation, a decree was issued regarding the minting of coins with the portrait of Victor Emmanuel III. The style of the 1-cent coin perfectly followed that of his predecessors, and with continuity the same author of his father's coins, Filippo Speranza, was also chosen. This coin was minted annually from 1902 to 1905 and a small amount in 1908 as well, in particular 20000000 of 1-cent coins between 1904 and 1905 were made from the bronze from the demonetized and cast 10-cent coins. The 1-cent coins minted up to 1908 may have a misalignment between the date numerals, less frequently between the cent letters, due to a misalignment of the movable punches in the minting.

Beginning in 1908, the style of the coin changed dramatically, initiating the series of cents called "Italy on prow" or "Maritime Italy." The new 1-cent coin changed from a typically 19th-century style to one influenced by Art Nouveau, which was beginning to spread in those years. The reverse image echoes that of the drachmas minted for Egypt during the principate of Antoninus Pius: these coins depict the seafaring goddess Isis, standing on the prow of a beaked ship, holding a sail. In the new cent of Victor Emmanuel III, the Egyptian fertility goddess is replaced with an allegory of Italy holding an olive branch instead of a sail. This coin was minted starting in 1908 with the use of the metal derived from the withdrawal from circulation and melting of 3000000 10-cent coins. Among those dated 1908, moreover, it is possible to distinguish two variants caused by the change of minting: while those struck first present the number 8 well-proportioned to the rest of the date, those manufactured after the change of minting present the smaller number 8. Another variation is represented by the 1910 coins, which have the mintmark in incuse instead of in relief, and by those of 1911, which in most cases have the dot after the date. In addition, in some 1915 coins it is possible to find a recoinage in which the allegory of Italy features four hands instead of two. 1-cent coins of this type were minted annually until 1918 and remained in circulation until June 30, 1924, when, as a result of the high inflation inherited from World War I, by a decree all 1-cent coins ceased to be legal tender.

== Coins ==
All the coins weigh 1g, were 15mm in diameter, had a smooth edge, and were made of bronze that had a composition of Cu 960‰ and Sn 40‰.

Image	Description		Years of mintage	Author	
Image	Obverse	Reverse	Years of mintage	Model maker	Engraver
	vittorio emanuele ii re d'italia around the king's bare head, in exergue the letter f • for the author Giuseppe Ferraris	1 centesimo, between laurel and oak branches tied at bottom with a bow and at top the star of Italy. In the exergue the mint mark: M (Milan), N (Naples), T (Turin)	1861–1867	Giuseppe Ferraris	
	umberto i re d'italia around the king's bare head, in exergue the letter s • for the author Giuseppe Ferraris	1 centesimo, between laurel and oak branches tied at the bottom with a bow and at the top the star of Italy, in the exergue the mintmark R (Rome)	1895–1900	Filippo Speranza	
	vittorio emanuele iii re d'italia around the king's bare head, in exergue the letter s • for the author Giuseppe Ferraris	1 centesimo, between laurel and oak branches tied at the bottom with a bow and at the top the star of Italy, in the exergue the mintmark R (Rome)	1902–1908	Filippo Speranza	
	vittorio • emanuele • iii • re • d'italia around the bust of the king in uniform	cent.1. allegory of Italy with an olive branch on the prow of a beaked ship. On the tip of the prow is the mintmark R (Rome) and on the side the initials: p.c.m. for Pietro Canonica (model maker), l.g.i. for Luigi Giorgi (engraver)	1908–1918	Pietro Canonica	Luigi Giorgi

=== Circulation ===
==== Victor Emmanuel II ====
Year	Milan (M)	Naples (N)	Turin (T)
1861	26720000	48280000	
1862		37499936	
1867	72758532		5000000
Total	190258468		

==== Umberto I ====
Year	Rome (R)
1895	13860000
1896	3730000
1897	1844500
1899	1287474
1900	10000000
Total	30721974

Victor Emmanuel III

Value
Year	Rome (R)
1902	26308
1903	5655000
1904	14626161
1905	8530531
1908	3859140
Total	32697140

Italy on prow
Year	Rome (R)
1908	56860
1909	3539000
1910	3598560
1911	700000
1912	3995000
1913	3200000
1914	11585000
1915	9757440
1916	9845000
1917	2400000
1918	2710000
Total	51386860

== Tests and designs ==
1 cent design
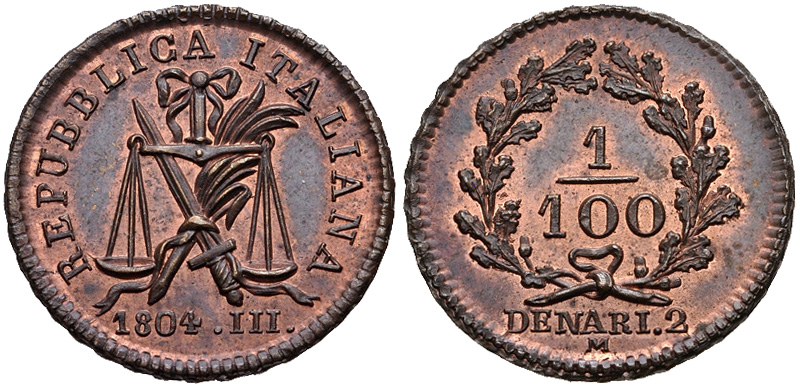
First side of the image: repubblica italiana coat of arms of the republic
Second side of the image: 1/100 between oak branches, bottom denari.2
1804, Cu, 2,4 g

The first design for the production of coins worth 1 cent of a lira dates back to the Napoleonic era when, following the French monetary reform, it was decided by decree dated April 26, 1804, to introduce the new coinage on a decimal basis also in the newly formed Italian Republic. The decree stipulated that the minting of the lira cent design should take place at the Milan mint, where once minted it would be analyzed by a commission composed of three members of the Legislative Council and two from the National Accountancy and then deposited for three years and finally melted down. The draft coin was made of copper and weighed 2 denari, equivalent to about 2.4 g; two types were minted with different reverses: one bore the value 1/100 while the other had the inscription cen / tesimo arranged on two lines.

The republican design was not followed through, so the first Italian 1 cent lira coin entered circulation in 1807 following the establishment of the Napoleonic Kingdom of Italy. Prior to its issuance, however, two test strikes dated 1806 and 1807 were minted, which compared to the final version differ slightly in design features and the use of mint marks. The 1806 test in the obverse has the letter M of the Milan mint in the exergue below the date while in the reverse it is completely devoid of the mint marks, the 1807 one on the other hand in the obverse has the two mint marks (a pomegranate and an inverted cup) as well as the letter M while in the reverse in the exergue there are the initials sg of the engraver Giuseppe Slavirich, a close collaborator of Luigi Manfredini.

Beginning with the proclamation of the Kingdom of Italy, no official tests of the 1-cent lira coin were ever minted; however, an exception was a design drawn up during the regency of Victor Emmanuel III. In 1917 World War I was eroding the kingdom's copper reserves, so to avoid using this metal in the minting of cents the mint thought of replacing copper with aluminum. Using the official coinage, a few aluminum cent coins weighing 0.35 g were thus issued, but the imminent end of the war put a definitive end to the project. In addition to the aluminum cent, a number of one-cent coins were minted annually from 1915 to 1918 during World War I, bearing on the right side, arranged in two lines and engraved in relief, the inscription i, ii, iii and iv anno di gverra.

== Similar coins ==
1 cent
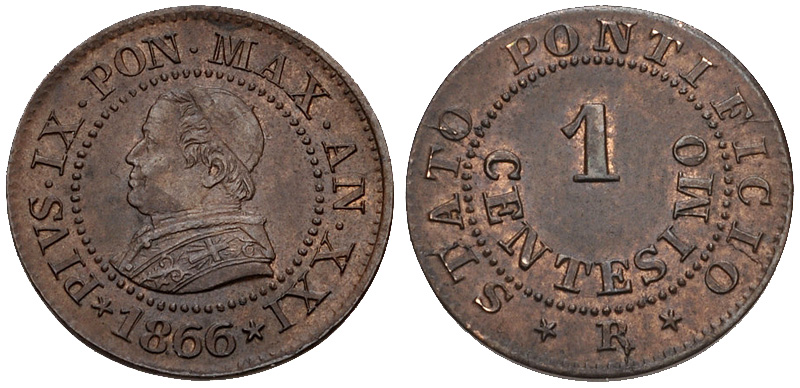
First side of the image: pivs ix pon max an xxi effigy of Pius IX
Second side of the image: stato pontificio, value 1, bottom centesimo
1866, Cu 960‰, 1 g

Beginning in 1865, Italy was a member country of the Latin Monetary Union, an agreement that required the signatory countries (France, Italy, Belgium, and Switzerland) to mint gold and silver coins equivalent to each other so that they could circulate freely in all member nations. The agreement did not include bronze coins, but nevertheless France and Italy adopted standard sizes; in particular, a weight of 1 g and a diameter of 15 mm were decided for the 1-cent coin. France had been minting 1-cent coins of this size since 1861 and continued to do so until 1920. Following this convention, the 1 centime coin was also introduced in 1891 in the French Protectorate of Tunisia. In 1867 the Kingdom of Greece also joined the monetary union and between 1869 and 1879 coined the 1 lepton coin following the same parameters used by the Italians and French.

Among the countries bound by bilateral agreements were Spain, which minted the 1 céntimo coin between 1870 and 1913, and Romania, which minted the 1 ban coin from 1867 to 1900. Later other countries also joined the agreement and began minting 1-cent coins following the French parameters; these included Crete, Finland, Bulgaria and Serbia. The Papal States also adopted the decimal coinage system and minted between 1866 and 1868 the new 1-cent coin following the standard measures used in the Union. Following the annexation of Rome to the Kingdom of Italy, all pontifical coins were withdrawn from circulation in 1870.

== Tokens ==
=== Lucky cent ===
Lucky cent
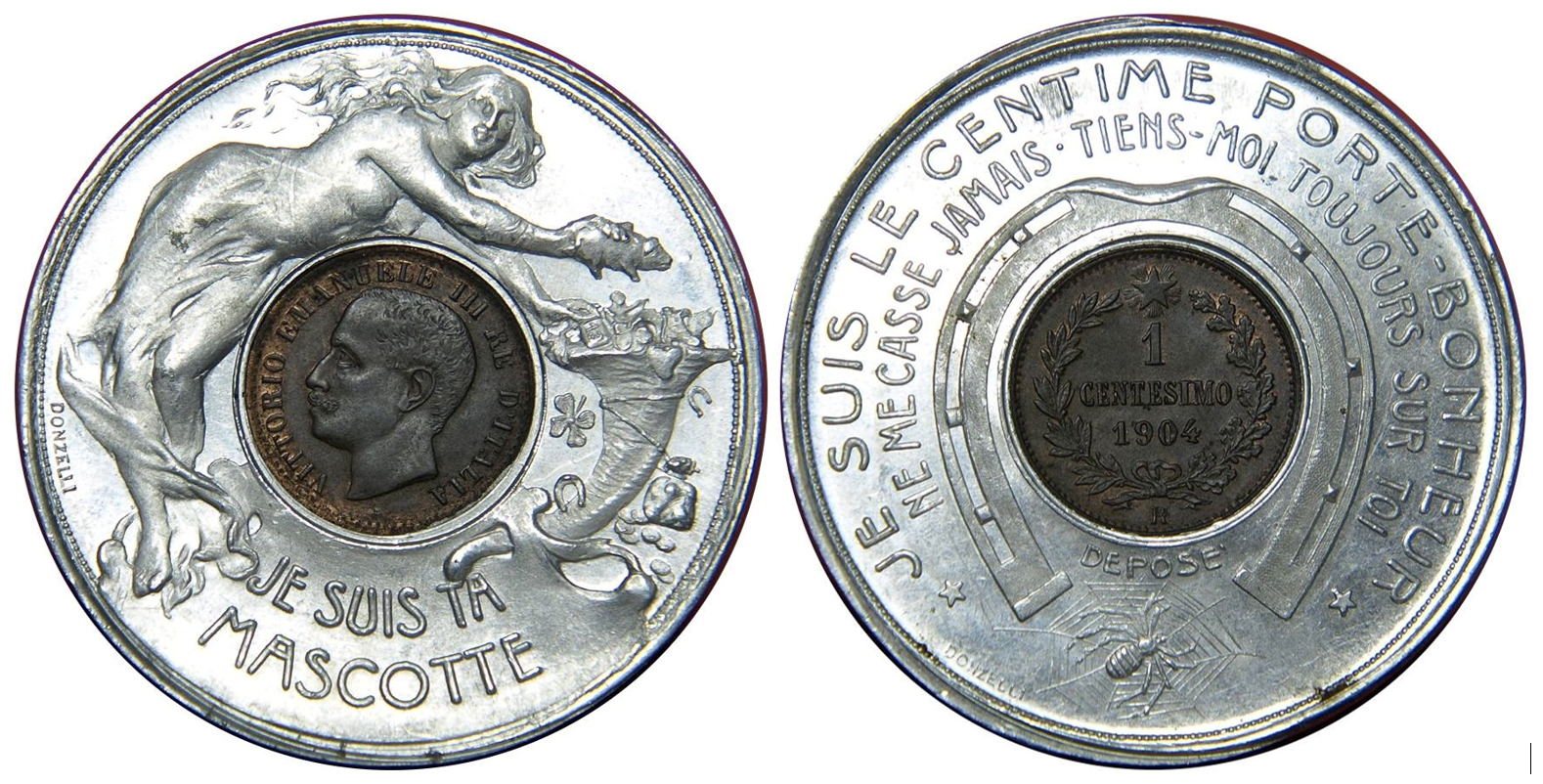

Advertising cent
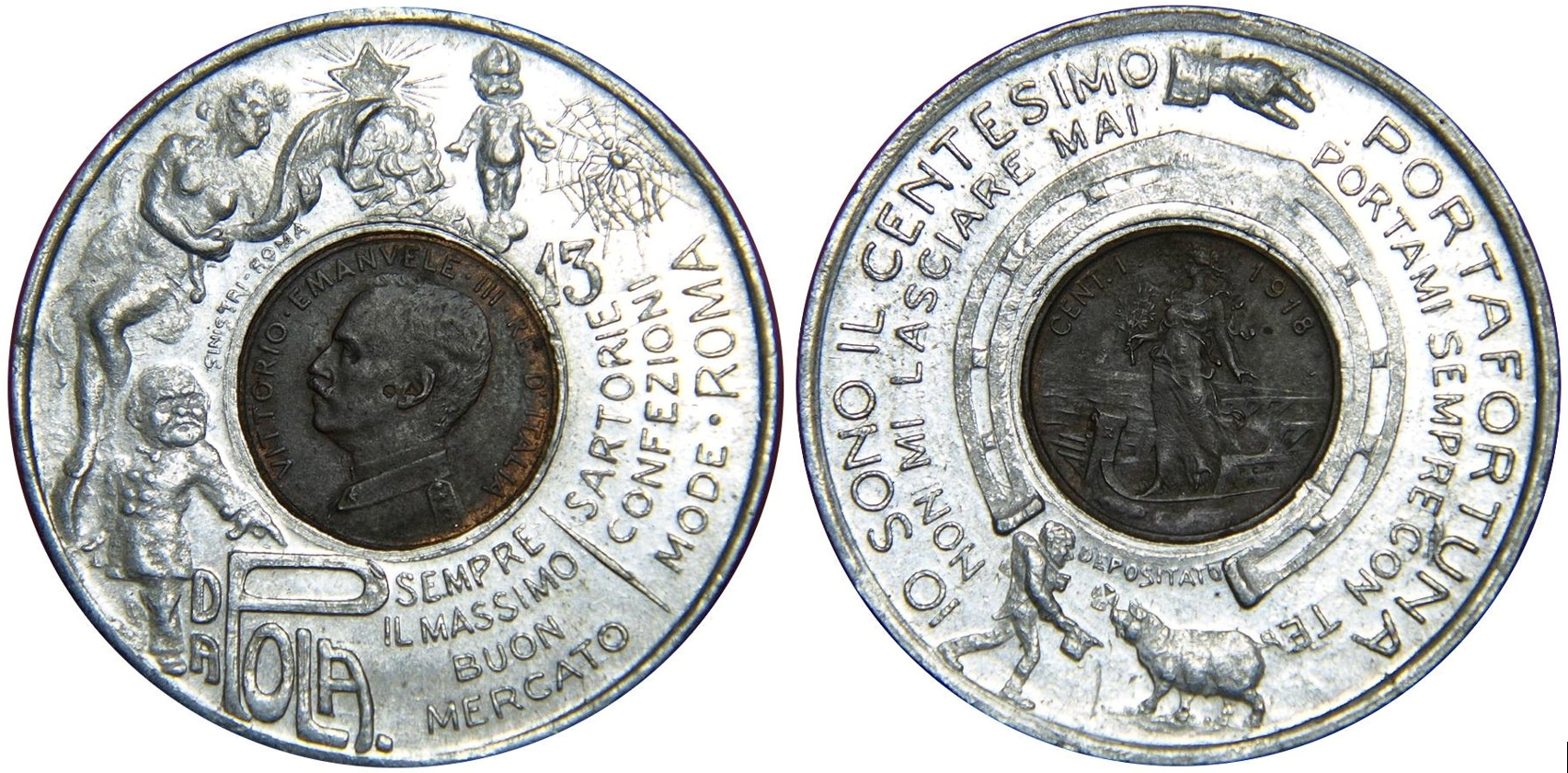
First side of the image: Woman in Art Nouveau style, symbols of good fortune or advertising inscriptions
Second side of the image: Horseshoe containing the cent and good luck inscriptions in Italian or French

Following the model of U.S. encased coins, coins set in a ring bearing advertising or good luck phrases, lucky cents also became widespread in Italy. With changes to the coinage, but following the same style as the Loubet cent, the Incisoria Donzelli coined for the one-cent coins contour rings bearing only phrases of good luck; sometimes these featured a sticker, transforming the lucky charm token into a medallion. These good luck tokens were also used by companies for advertising purposes. Donzelli also engraved one of these tokens for the English firm Pola & Todescan, and the same firm later had another advertising token coined containing the cent of the Italy on prow type. Another firm that used this type of token was the Venetian Jesurum, which coined a brass advertising token containing the cent of Victor Emmanuel III.

=== Loubet cent ===
Between October 14 and 18, 1903, Victor Emmanuel III and Queen Consort Elena of Montenegro made their first state visit to France, where a bronze propaganda token imitating the 5-cent franc was issued for the occasion. The visit to Italy by French President Émile Loubet was corresponded between April 24 and 28, 1904, and many souvenirs were produced for the event to commemorate the meeting, including a commemorative token issued by the Milanese Incisoria Donzelli, which, because of its similarity to the 1-cent coin, was improperly named the Loubet cent. The depiction on the obverse was quite similar to that of the Vittorio Emanuele III cent, the only difference being the initials of the engraver Antonio Donzelli (a.d.), which replaced in the same position on the coin that of Filippo Speranza (s •). The reverse depicted the face of the French president surrounded by the inscription mR. emile loubet pres. repub. franç. under which the engraver's initials were still present.

Three versions of this token were produced, of which the bronze one was the most similar to the centime since in addition to imitating its design, composition and color it was also characterized by similar dimensions: it weighed 1.24 g instead of 1 g and had a diameter of 15.2 mm instead of 15 mm. The other two versions were minted in aluminum (0.73 g, 15.5 mm) and gilt bronze (1.25 g, 15.2 mm). In particular, two gilt bronze specimens set in an aluminum ring were given by engraver Antonio Donzelli to Émile Loubet upon his arrival in Civitavecchia and to Victor Emmanuel III, who was residing at the Quirinal Palace at the time. The aluminum ring on the obverse featured a horseshoe containing the token surrounded by the inscription • souvenir d'italie - avril 1904 • and on the lower line a' l'avenir des deux soeurs de gloire. In the lower area were two four-leaf clovers between which were visible the coats of arms of Italy and France surmounted by a spider in its web and the inscription deposè, there was also the signature donzelli on both sides of the ring. On the reverse side outlining the token was an Art Nouveau-style woman flanked by a cornucopia and other symbols of good fortune, while the lower part featured the inscription je suis ta mascotte. In addition to the two gilded bronze tokens given to heads of state this ring was used to hold the other two versions of the token and also the 1904 1-cent coins.

== See also ==
- Italian lira
- Sardinian lira
- Lombardo-Venetian lira

== Bibliography ==
- Catalogo Alfa delle Monete italiane e Regioni - 33ª edizione. Torino: Alfa Edizioni. 2008.
- Gigante, Fabio (2013). Monete italiane dal '700 all'avvento dell'euro, 21ª ed. Varese: Gigante. ISBN 978-88-89805-35-0.
- Montenegro, Eupremio (2008). Manuale del collezionista di monete italiane, 29ª ed. Torino: Edizioni Montenegro. ISBN 978-88-88894-03-4.
- Pagani, Antonio. Monete italiane dall'invasione napoleonica ai giorni d'oggi (1796-1963).
- Barman, Scott (2019). Coin Collector's Handbook. Lulu.com. ISBN 9780359891849.
- Cournot, Antoine Augustin (2013) [1838]. Elean Franco Nani (ed.). Opere. Novara: Unione tipografico-editrice torinese. ISBN 978-88-418-9365-4.
- Michael, Thomas (2015). Standard Catalog of World coins 1801-1900 (8 ed.). Iola: Krause Publications.
- Repossi, Luigi (1877). Milano e la sua zecca. Torino: Ermanno Loescher.
- Vittorio Emanuele III (1910). Corpus Nummorum Italicorum (PDF). Vol. 1 (1 ed.). Roma: Tipografia dell'Accademia Nazionale dei Lincei.
- Vittorio Emanuele III (1914). Corpus Nummorum Italicorum (PDF). Vol. 5 (1 ed.). Roma: Tipografia dell'Accademia Nazionale dei Lincei.
- Willis, Henry Parker (1901). A History of the Latin Monetary Union. Chicago: U. Chicago Press.
