= Persecution of Jews =

The persecution of Jews is a major aspect of the history of antisemitism and Jewish history, and as a result, it has prompted shifting waves of refugees and the formation of diaspora communities around the world. The earliest major event occurred in 597 BCE, when the Neo-Babylonian Empire conquered the Kingdom of Judah and then persecuted and exiled many of its Jewish subjects. Antisemitism has been widespread across many regions of the world and it has also been practiced by many different peoples, governments, and adherents of different religions.

Jews have been commonly used as scapegoats for tragedies and disasters such as the Black Death, the decline of the Russian Empire, and the ideology of Nazism, which led to the Holocaust, the mass murder of six million Jews during World War II.

== Ancient history ==
=== Neo-Babylonian Empire ===
The Babylonian captivity or the Babylonian exile is the period in Jewish history during which a large number of Judeans from the ancient Kingdom of Judah were captives in Babylon, the capital city of the Neo-Babylonian Empire, following their defeat in the Jewish–Babylonian war and the destruction of Solomon's Temple in Jerusalem. The event is described in the Hebrew Bible, and its historicity is supported by archaeological and non-biblical evidence.

After the Battle of Carchemish in 605 BC, the Babylonian king Nebuchadnezzar II besieged Jerusalem, which resulted in tribute being paid by the Judean king Jehoiakim. In the fourth year of Nebuchadnezzar II's reign, Jehoiakim refused to pay further tribute. This led to another siege of the city in Nebuchadnezzar II's seventh year that culminated in the death of Jehoiakim and the exile to Babylonia of his successor Jeconiah, his court and many others.

Jeconiah's successor Zedekiah and others were exiled in Nebuchadnezzar II's 18th year. A later deportation occurred in Nebuchadnezzar II's 23rd year. The dates, numbers of deportations, and numbers of deportees given in the biblical accounts vary. These deportations are dated to 597 BC for the first, with others dated at 587/586 BC, and 582/581 BC respectively.

=== Seleucid Empire ===
When Judea fell under the authority of the Seleucid Empire, the process of Hellenization was enforced by law. This effectively meant requiring pagan religious practice. In 167 BC Jewish sacrifice was forbidden, sabbaths and feasts were banned and circumcision was outlawed. Altars to Greek gods were set up and animals prohibited to Jews were sacrificed on them. The Olympian Zeus was placed on the altar of the Temple. Possession of Jewish scriptures was made a capital offense.

=== Roman Empire ===
The Jewish Encyclopaedia refers to the antisemitic persecution of Jews and the paganization of Jerusalem during the reign of Emperor Hadrian (117–138 AD):

The Jews now passed through a period of bitter persecution: Sabbaths, festivals, the study of the Torah and circumcision were interdicted, and it seemed as if Hadrian desired to annihilate the Jewish people. His anger fell upon all the Jews of his empire, for he imposed upon them an oppressive poll-tax. The persecution, however, did not last long, for Antoninus Pius (138–161) revoked the cruel edicts.

== Medieval period ==
=== Europe ===
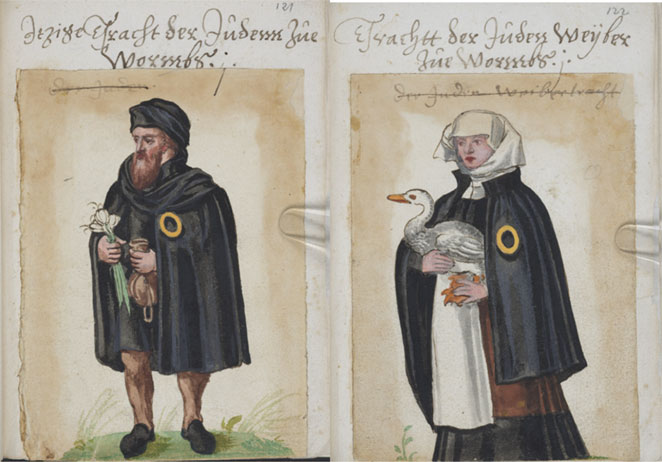
Jews from Worms, Germany wear the mandatory yellow badge. A money bag and garlic in the hands are an antisemitic stereotype (sixteenth-century drawing).

In the Middle Ages, antisemitism in Europe was religious. Many Christians, including members of the clergy, held the Jewish people collectively responsible for the killing of Jesus. As stated in the Boston College Guide to Passion Plays, "Over the course of time, Christians began to accept … that the Jewish people as a whole were responsible for killing Jesus. According to this interpretation, both the Jews present at Jesus Christ's death and the Jewish people collectively and for all time, have committed the sin of deicide, or 'god-killing'. For 1900 years of Christian-Jewish history, the charge of deicide has led to hatred, violence against and murder of Jews in Europe and America."

During the High Middle Ages in Europe, there was full-scale persecution of Jews in many places, with blood libels, expulsions, forced conversions and massacres. The persecution reached its first peak during the Crusades. In the First Crusade (1096), flourishing communities on the Rhine and the Danube were utterly destroyed, a prime example being the Rhineland massacres.

In the Second Crusade (1147), Jews in France were subject to frequent massacres. The Jews were also subjected to attacks by the Shepherds' Crusades of 1251 and 1320. The Crusades were followed by expulsions. All English Jews were banished in 1290. 100,000 Jews were expelled from France in 1396. In 1421, thousands were expelled from Austria. Many of the expelled Jews fled to Poland.

As the Black Death epidemics devastated Europe in the mid-14th century, annihilating more than half of the population, Jews were taken as scapegoats. Rumors spread that they caused the disease by deliberately poisoning wells. Hundreds of Jewish communities were destroyed by violence in the Black Death persecutions. Although Pope Clement VI tried to protect them by papal bull on July 6, 1348 – with another following later in 1348 – several months afterwards, 900 Jews were burnt alive in Strasbourg, where the plague hadn't yet affected the city.

One study finds that persecutions and expulsions of Jews increased with negative economic shocks and climatic variations in Europe during the period from 1100 to 1600. The authors of the study argue that this stems from people blaming Jews for misfortunes and weak rulers going after Jewish wealth in times of fiscal crisis. The authors propose several explanations for why Jewish persecutions significantly declined after 1600:

1. there were simply fewer Jewish communities to persecute by the 17th century;
2. improved agricultural productivity, or, better-integrated markets may have reduced vulnerability to temperature shocks;
3. the rise of stronger states may have led to more robust protection for religious and ethnic minorities;
4. there were fewer negative temperature shocks.
5. the impact of the Reformation and the Enlightenment may have reduced anti-semitic attitudes.

=== Muslim world ===
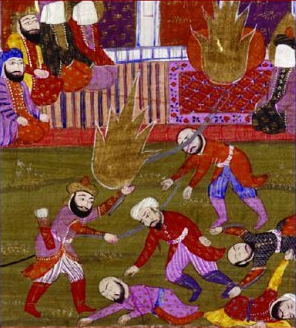
The massacre of the Jewish Banu Qurayza in Arabia

According to Mark R. Cohen, during the rise of Islam, the first encounters between Muslims and Jews resulted in friendship when the people of Medina gave Muhammad refuge, among them were Jewish tribes of Medina. Conflict arose when Muhammad expelled certain Jewish tribes after they refused to swear their allegiance to him and aided Meccan pagans. He adds that this encounter was an exception rather than a rule.

Of the three Jewish tribes of Medina, the Banu Nadir and the Banu Qaynuqa were expelled in the course of Muhammad's rule after suspicion arose in the Muslim leadership that the Jews were planning the assassination of Muhammad. On the other hand, the Banu Qurayza tribe was exterminated by Muhammad in the aftermath of the Battle of the Trench. The tribe was accused of colluding with Meccan enemies during the Meccan siege of Medina and subsequently besieged. When they surrendered, all grown men were executed and women and children were enslaved. Muhammad is recorded as saying that he would expel all Jews and Christians from Arabia, although this was not carried out until the reign of Umar.

When Amr ibn al-As conquered Tripoli in 643, he forced the Jewish and Christian Berbers to give their wives and children as slaves to the Arab army as part of their jizya.

Traditionally, Jews living in Islamic states were subjected to the status of dhimmi, therefore they were allowed to practice their religion and administer their internal affairs, but were subjects to certain conditions. They had to pay the jizya (a per capita tax imposed on free adult non-Muslim males) to Muslims. Dhimmis had an inferior status under Islamic rule. They had several social and legal disabilities such as prohibitions against bearing arms or giving testimony in courts in cases involving Muslims. Contrary to popular belief, the Qur'an did not order Muslims to force Jews to wear distinctive clothing. Obadiah the Proselyte reported in 1100 AD that the Caliph had created this rule himself.

Resentment toward Jews perceived as having attained too lofty a position in Islamic society also fueled antisemitism and massacres. In Andalusian Spain, ibn Hazm and Abu Ishaq focused their anti-Jewish writings on this allegation. This was also the chief motivation behind the 1066 Granada massacre, when "[m]ore than 1,500 Jewish families, numbering 4,000 persons, fell in one day", and in Fez in 1033, when 6,000 Jews were killed. There were further massacres in Fez in 1276 and 1465.

In 1354, Muslim mobs in Egypt "ran amok ... attacking Christians and Jews in the streets, and throwing them into bonfires if they refused to pronounce the shadādatayn."

The Almohads wreaked enormous destruction on both the Jewish and Christian populations in Spain and North Africa. This devastation, massacre, captivity, and forced conversion was described by the Jewish chronicler Abraham ibn Daud and the poet Abraham ibn Ezra. Suspicious of the sincerity of the Jewish converts to Islam, Muslim "inquisitors" took children from their families and placed them in the care of Muslim educators.

Maimonides, who had to flee from Almohad-controlled Iberia with his family, said "God has hurled us in the midst of this people, the Arabs, who have persecuted us severely, and passed baneful and discriminatory legislation against us. Never did a nation molest, degrade, debase, and hate us as much as they. We bear the inhumane burden of their humiliation, lies and absurdities, being as the prophet said, 'like a deaf man who does not hear or a dumb man who does not open his mouth' ... Our sages disciplined us to bear Ishmael's lies and absurdities, listening in silence, and we have trained ourselves, old and young, to endure their humiliation, as Isaiah said, 'I have given my back to the smiters, and my cheek to the beard pullers.'"

== Early modern period ==
The Jews suffered during the Ottoman conquests and policies of colonization and population transfers (the surgun system). This resulted in the disappearance of several Jewish communities, including Salonica, and their replacement by Jewish refugees from Spain. Joseph R. Hacker observes:

We possess letters written about the fate of Jews who underwent one or another of the Ottoman conquests. In one of the letters which was written before 1470, there is a description of the fate of such a Jew and his community, according to which description, written in Rhodes and sent to Crete, the fate of the Jews was not different from that of Christians. Many were killed; others were taken captive, and children were [enslaved, forcibly converted to Islam, and] brought to devshirme…. Some letters describe the carrying of the captive Jews to Istanbul and are filled with anti-Ottoman sentiments. Moreover, we have a description of the fate of a Jewish doctor and homilist from Veroia (Kara-Ferya) who fled to Negroponte when his community was driven into exile in 1455. He furnished us with a description of the exiles and their forced passage to Istanbul. Later on we find him at Istanbul itself, and in a homily delivered there in 1468 he expressed his anti-Ottoman feelings openly. We also have some evidence that the Jews of Constantinople suffered from the conquest of the city and that several were sold into slavery.

Hacker concludes that the friendly policies of Mehmed and the good reception by Bayezid II of Spanish Jews likely caused 16th century Jewish writers to overlook both the destruction Byzantine Jews suffered during the Ottoman conquests and the later outbursts of oppression under Bayezid II and Selim I.

Sultan Murad IV wished to be seen as the exemplar of right religion, and believed it was politically and legally required to treat second-class non-Muslims with the appropriate contempt and humble them. In 1631, he issued a decree re-enforcing the dress restrictions for non-Muslims:

Insult and humiliate infidels in garment, clothing and manner of dress according to Muslim law and imperial statute. Henceforth, do not allow them to mount a horse, wear sable fur, sable fur caps, satin and silk velvet. Do not allow their women to wear mohair caps wrapped in cloth and "Paris" cloth. Do not allow infidels and Jews to go about in Muslim manner and garment. Hinder and remove these kinds. Do not lose a minute in executing the order that I have proclaimed in this manner.

When a fire devastated much of Constantinople in 1660, the Ottomans blamed the Jews and expelled them from the city. Inscribed in the royal mosque in Constantinople was a reference to Prophets Muhammad's expulsion of the Jews from Medina; the mosque's endowment deed has a reference to "the Jews who are the enemy of Islam."

In the Zaydi imamate of Yemen, Jews were singled out for discrimination in the 17th century, which culminated in the general expulsion of all Jews from places in Yemen to the arid coastal plain of Tihamah, and which became known as the Mawza Exile.

== Late modern period ==
=== Muslim world ===
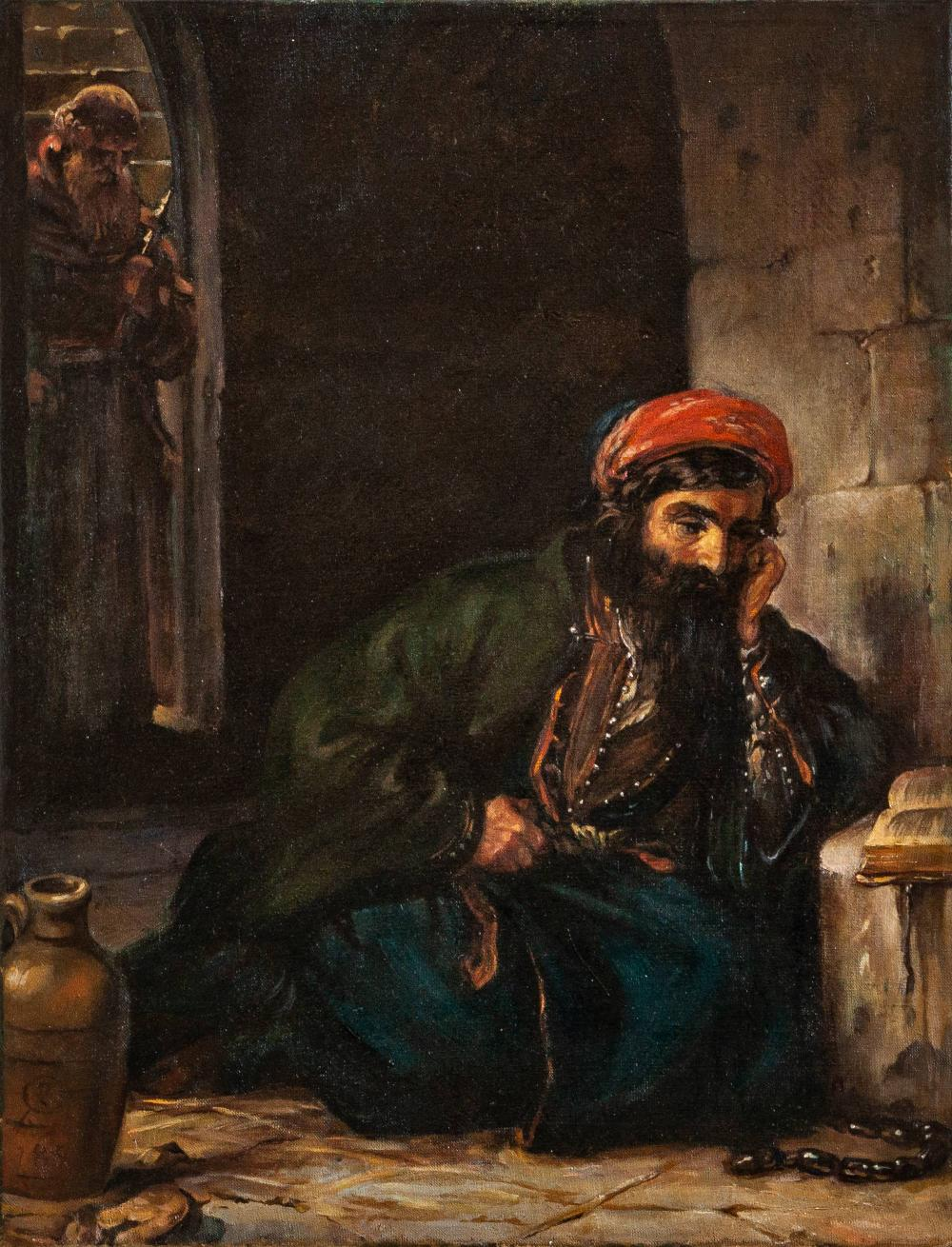
Jewish prisoner preparing his defence, a Capuchin distant in the doorway. Painting by Moritz Daniel Oppenheim

Under the rule of Mir Muhammad the Jewish population was affected by violence and looting notably during the Siege of Amadiya. They "were treated with merciless cruelty and oppression." Many were forced to migrate and some fled the city after its fall. Similar reports are mentioned for other towns under his control, including Ranya, Khoy, Erbil, Aqra, and Zakho. After the Kurds sacked Mosul during the Yazidi campaign, they also killed the local Jews and Christians. Dr. Lobdell, an American missionary, visited Mir Muhammad in Urmia, where he wrote: "The Pasha of Ravendooz told me that when he was first appointed to that district (Urmia), three years since, Jews were bought and sold by the Koords as commonly as don-keys."

Following the defeat of Mir Muhammad, Amadiya came under the rule of the Ottoman governor of Mosul. The situation of the Jewish community improved slightly.

The Damascus affair occurred in 1840 when an Italian monk and his servant disappeared in Damascus. Immediately following, a charge of ritual murder was brought against a large number of Jews in the city including children who were tortured. The consuls of the United Kingdom, France and Germany as well as Ottoman authorities, Christians, Muslims and Jews all played a great role in this affair.

There was a massacre of Jews in Baghdad in 1828. There was another massacre in Barfurush in 1867.

In early 1892, a pogrom started against the Jewish residents of Zakho, a city in Iraqi Kurdistan. During the pogrom, seven Jews were killed, homes and synagogues were burned, and many members of the Jewish community were imprisoned, tortured, and subjected to heavy taxation.

In 1839, in the eastern Persian city of Meshed, a mob burst into the Jewish Quarter, burned the synagogue, and destroyed the Torah scrolls. This is known as the Allahdad incident. Between 30 and 40 people were killed, and it was only by forcible conversion that a large-scale massacre was averted.

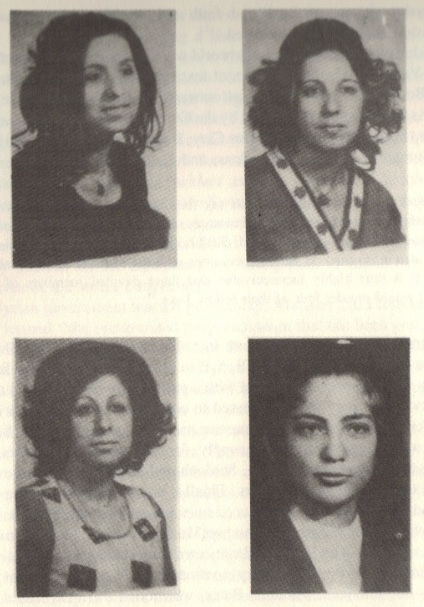
Four Jewish women found dead in a cave in the Zabdani Mountains in 1974 by Syrian border police

During the outbreak of World War 1, it was reported that 30,000 Jews in Jerusalem and vicinity had died from starvation and pestilence due to Turkish military requisitions.

In Palestine there were riots and pogroms against Jews in 1920 and 1921. Tensions over the Western Wall in Jerusalem led to the 1929 Palestine riots, whose main victims were the ancient Jewish community at Hebron.

In 1941, following Rashid Ali's pro-Axis coup, riots known as the Farhud broke out in Baghdad, during which approximately 180 Jews were killed, about 240 were wounded, 586 Jewish-owned businesses were looted, and 99 Jewish houses were destroyed.

On March 2, 1974, the bodies of four Syrian Jewish women were discovered by border police in a cave in the Zabdani Mountains northwest of Damascus. Fara Zeibak, 24, her sisters, Lulu Zeibak, 23, Mazal Zeibak, 22 and their cousin, Eva Saad, 18, had contracted with a band of smugglers to flee from Syria to Lebanon and eventually to Israel. The girls' bodies were found raped, murdered and mutilated. The police also found the remains of two Jewish boys, Natan Shaya 18 and Kassem Abadi 20, victims of an earlier massacre. Syrian authorities deposited the bodies of all six in sacks before the homes of their parents in the Jewish ghetto in Damascus.

=== Nazi Germany ===
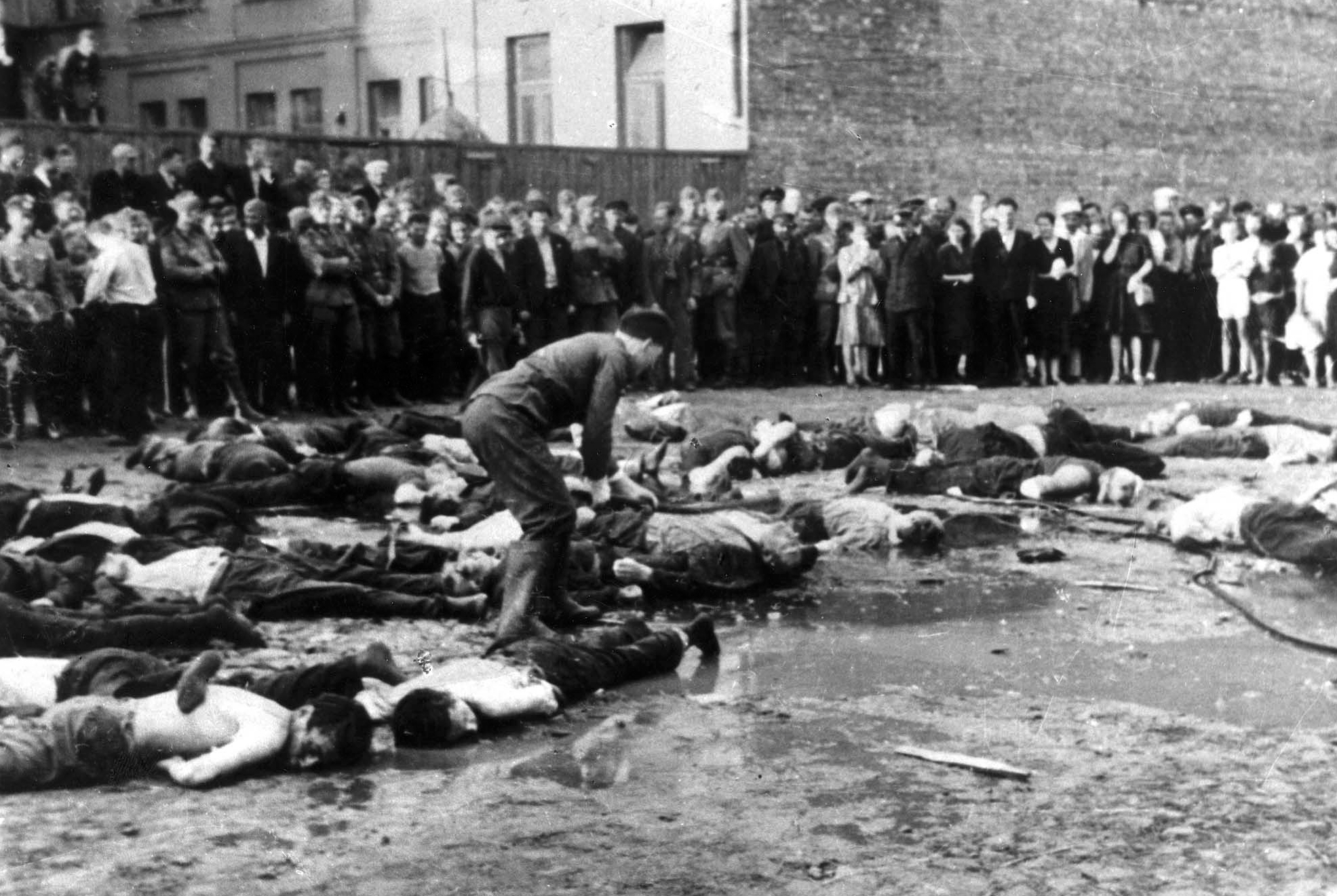
The Kaunas pogrom in German-occupied Lithuania, June 1941

The deadliest event in Jewish history and the history of the persecution of Jews was preceded by the imposition of policies by Nazi Germany, which considered the destruction of Jews a high priority, starting with the persecution of Jews and culminating in the killing of approximately 6,000,000 Jews during World War II and the Holocaust from 1941 to 1945. Originally, the Nazis used death squads, the Einsatzgruppen, to conduct massive open-air killings of Jews who lived in the territories that they conquered. By 1942, the Nazi leadership decided to implement the Final Solution, the genocide of the Jews of Europe, and increase the pace of the Holocaust by establishing extermination camps for the specific purpose of killing Jews as well as other perceived undesirables such as people who openly opposed Hitler.

This method of genocide was industrialized. Millions of Jews who had been confined to disease-ridden and massively overcrowded ghettos were transported (often by train) to death camps, where some of them were herded into a specific location (often a gas chamber), then, they were either gassed or they were shot to death. Other prisoners simply committed suicide, unable to go on after witnessing the horrors of camp life. Afterward, their bodies were often searched for any valuable or useful materials, such as gold fillings, women's hair was cut off, and then their remains were either buried in mass graves or burned. Others were interned in the camps and during their internment, they were given little food and disease was rampant.

Escapes from the camps were few, but they were not unknown. For example, the few escapes from Auschwitz that succeeded were made possible by the Polish underground (which operated inside the camp) and local people who lived outside. In 1940, the Auschwitz commandant claimed that "the local population is fanatically Polish and ... prepared to take any action against the hated SS camp personnel. Every prisoner who managed to escape can count on help the moment he reaches the wall of the first Polish farmstead."

=== Apartheid South Africa ===
During the 1930s, many Nationalist Party leaders and wide sections of the Afrikaner people strongly came under the influence of the Nazi movement that dominated Germany from 1933 to 1945. There were many reasons for this. Germany was the traditional enemy of Britain, and whoever opposed Britain was seen as a friend of the Nationalists. Many Nationalists, moreover, believed that the opportunity to re-establish their lost republic would come with the defeat of the British Empire in the international arena. The more belligerent Hitler became, the higher hopes rose that a new era of Afrikanerdom was about to dawn.

During the 1930s, the Nationalists found much in common with the 'South African Gentile National Socialist Movement', headed by Johannes von Strauss von Moltke, whose objective was to combat and destroy the alleged 'perversive influence of the Jews in economics, culture, religion, ethics and statecraft, and re-establish European Aryan control in South Africa for the welfare of the Christian peoples of South Africa'.

=== Tsarist Russia ===
For much of the 19th century, Imperial Russia, which included much of Poland, Ukraine, Moldova and the Baltic states, contained the world's largest Jewish population. From Alexander III's reign until the end of Tsarist rule in Russia, many Jews were often restricted to the Jewish Pale of Settlement and they were also banned from many jobs and locations. Jews were subject to racial laws, such as the May Laws, and they were also targeted in hundreds of violent anti-Jewish riots, called pogroms, which received unofficial state support. During this period a hoax document alleging a global Jewish conspiracy, The Protocols of the Elders of Zion, was published.

The Tsarist government implemented policies that ensured that the Jews would remain isolated. However, the government tolerated the existence of their religious and national institutions and it also allowed them to emigrate. The restrictions and discriminatory laws drove many Russian Jews to embrace liberal and socialist causes. However, following the Russian Revolution, many politically active Jews forfeited their Jewish identity. According to Leon Trotsky, "[Jews] considered themselves neither Jews nor Russians but socialists. To them, Jews were not a nation but a class of exploiters whose fate it was to dissolve and assimilate." In the aftermath of the overthrow of Tsarist Russia, Jews found themselves in a tragic predicament. Conservative Russians saw them as a disloyal and subversive element, while the radicals viewed the Jews as a doomed social class.

== Contemporary period ==
=== Soviet Union ===
Even though many of the Old Bolsheviks were ethnically Jewish, they sought to uproot Judaism and Zionism and to achieve this goal, they established the Yevsektsiya. By the end of the 1940s, the Communist leadership of the former USSR had liquidated almost all Jewish organizations, with the exception of a few token synagogues. These synagogues were then placed under police surveillance, both openly and through the use of informants. They were strongly opposed to Judaism (and indeed to any religion) and conducted an extensive campaign to suppress the religious traditions among the Jewish population, alongside the traditional Jewish culture.

After 1948, antisemitism reached new heights in the Soviet Union, especially during the anti-cosmopolitan campaign, in which numerous Yiddish-writing poets, writers, painters and sculptors were arrested or killed. This campaign culminated in the so-called Doctors' plot, in which a group of doctors (almost all of whom were Jewish) were subjected to a show trial for supposedly having plotted to assassinate Stalin. Although repression eased after Stalin's death, persecution of Jews would continue until the late 1980s (see: refuseniks).

=== Middle East ===
While Jews have been present in the Middle East since ancient times and have been a part of some societies, they have faced historical persecution, which has been ongoing in Middle Eastern countries with minority Jewish populations. Though in the medieval era, many Jewish people were integrated into their environment, yet most Jews did not assimilate into Muslim culture, and retained their religious and cultural identity. There have been many anti-Jewish riots in the region, such as 1945 anti-Jewish riots in Tripolitania and 1967 Tripoli pogrom. Following the 1948 Arab–Israeli War, and 1967 Arab–Israeli War, the vast majority of Middle Eastern Jews fled the Muslim Middle-east countries and moved to Israel and the Western countries.

=== Lebanon ===
In 1911, Jews from Italy, Greece, Syria, and some other countries moved to Beirut, expanding the local community. For a brief period under the French Mandate of Lebanon and 1926 Constitution of Lebanon, the Jewish community of Lebanon was constitutionally protected, however, outside of Beirut, the attitudes toward Jews were often hostile.

After 1947, the security of Jews remained fragile, and the main synagogue in Beirut was bombed in the early 1950s, and the Lebanese Chamber of Deputies moved a unanimous resolution to expel and exclude Jews from the Lebanese Army.

In the wake of the 1967 Arab–Israeli War, there was mass emigration of around 6,000 Lebanese Jews from Lebanon to Italy, Israel, Canada, United States, and some other Western countries.

The Lebanese Civil War, which started in 1975, brought immense suffering for the remaining Lebanese Jewish community, leading to a mass exodus of over 1,800 of the remaining Lebanese Jews. 1982 Lebanon-Israel war further reduced the number of Jews in the country.

As of 2005, the Jewish quarter of Beirut, Wadi Abu Jamil, was virtually abandoned, and the synagogue was in a dilapidated condition after the assassination of Prime Minister Rafik Hariri, and there were only around 40 elderly Jews left in Beirut, almost bringing an end to the History of the Jews in Lebanon.

=== Libya ===
==== 1945 anti-Jewish riots in Tripolitania ====
In 1945, there were anti-Jewish riots in Tripolitania, in which over 140 people were killed. Again in 1948 Anti-Jewish riots in Tripolitania, 14 Jewish people were killed.

==== 1967 Tripoli anti-Jewish pogrom ====
In June 1967, an anti-Jewish pogrom took place in Tripoli. The 1967 riot broke out in response to the Six-Day War between Israel and the Arab world. Arab leaders, especially Gamal Abdel Nasser, broadcast public statements calling for the destruction of Israel and in support for the Arab cause.

On the night of 5 June 1967, the day the war started, a mob of hundreds of Muslim Libyans attacked Jewish homes and businesses in the city's Jewish Quarter, burning the Bet-El synagogue to the ground. Rioters attacked and set fire to Jewish houses, stores and cars, in addition to looting Jewish properties. Of all Jewish assets, both public and private, 60% were destroyed.

King Idris of Libya tried to evacuate the Jewish population, transporting 3,000 Jews into a former British military base in the Libyan Desert. Staff of the Italian Alitalia airline also shielded Jews who had fled to the airport for safety; the airline staff also helped repel rioting mobs from getting to the airport and provided numerous plane tickets to Jews so they could escape safely. Alitalia's efforts were assisted by Chief Rabbi of Rome Elio Toaff and the Government of Italy.

According to sources, at least 18 Jews were killed in the pogrom, and another 25 were injured.

The pogrom was beginning of the end for Jews in Libya. 4,100 Jews managed to flee the country to Italy, including 2,500 who arrived to Rome via Alitalia. After Muammar Gaddafi took power in a 1969 coup, he ordered a persecution campaign against his country's Jewish minority, which led to the remaining 100 Jews fleeing the country.

== See also ==
- Antisemitic tropes
- Stereotypes of Jews
- Antisemitism
- Antisemitism by country
- History of antisemitism
- Normalization of antisemitism
- Religious antisemitism
- Racial antisemitism
- New antisemitism
- Anti-Judaism
- Anti-Zionism
- Jewish views on religious pluralism
- Judaism and violence
- Martyrdom in Judaism
