= Anti-Jewish riots in Tripolitania =

Anti-Jewish riots in Tripolitania may refer to:

- 1945 Anti-Jewish riots in Tripolitania
- 1948 Anti-Jewish riots in Tripolitania
