= History of the Jews in Carthage =

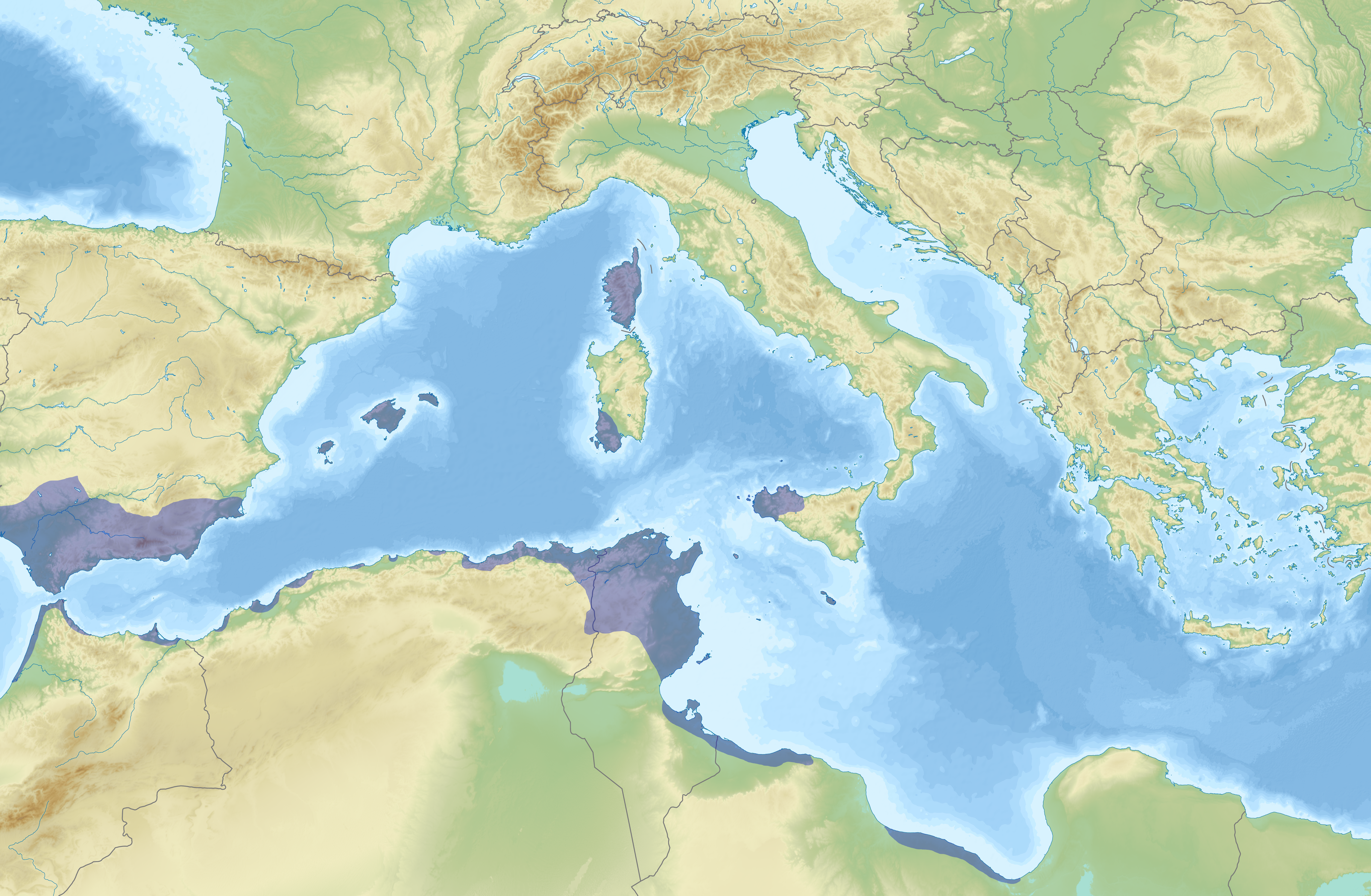
Location of Carthage and Carthaginian sphere of influence prior to the First Punic War (264 BCE).

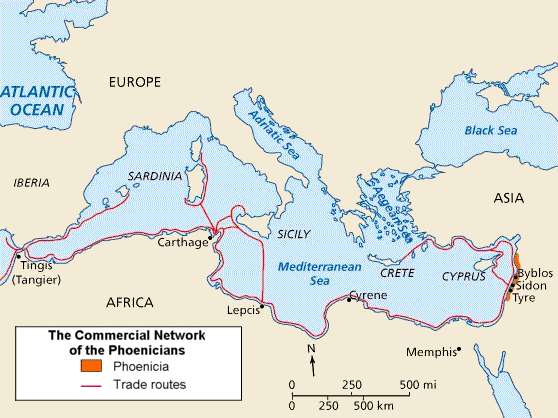
Trade routes of the Phoenicians.

Carthage (from Punic: 𐤒𐤓𐤕𐤟𐤇𐤃𐤔𐤕, romanized: qart hadašt, lit. 'New City') was a city in North Africa located on the eastern side of the Lake of Tunis across from the center of what is now Tunis in Tunisia.

Though Josephus associated the city's foundation with Jews and some scholars have conjectured that small groups of Jews may have been present in Carthage as early as the Punic era, the earliest evidence of Jewish presence in the area dates to the 2nd century CE.

== Origins ==
Carthage was founded by Tyrians.

According to the Hebrew Bible, Tyre and Sidon were part of the tribe of Asher.

The fifth lot fell to the tribe of the Asherites, by their clans. Their boundary ran along Helkath, Hali, Beten, Achshaph, Allammelech, Amad, and Mishal; and it touched Carmel on the west, and Shihor-libnath. It also ran along the east side to Beth-dagon, and touched Zebulun and the Valley of Iphtah-el to the north, [as also] Beth-emek and Neiel; then it ran to Cabul on the north, Ebron, Rehob, Hammon, and Kanah, up to Great Sidon. The boundary turned to Ramah and on to the fortified city of Tyre; then the boundary turned to Hosah and it ran on westward to Mehebel, Achzib, Ummah, Aphek, and Rehob: 22 towns, with their villages. That was the portion of the tribe of the Asherites, by their clans—those towns, with their villages.

— "Joshua 19:24-25". www.sefaria.org.

== Identification with Tarshish ==
The Hebrew Bible never mentions Carthage, though the Septuagint translated the toponym Tarshish at Isaiah 23:1 as Karkhēdōn (Koine Greek: Kαρχηδών), the Greek term Josephus used in his Against Apion to denote Carthage. The term Tarshish also figures in the Book of Jonah, where Jonah, to evade God's mission that he preach in Nineveh, boards ship in Jaffa, and sails towards a city of that name. This led some to suggest that there too Carthage was his objective. Much modern research tends to the view, however, that the Tarshish here denotes the Iberian Tartessos.

== Jewish settlement ==
A tradition conserved among the Jews of Djerba nearby states that the community was built of exiles after the Siege of Jerusalem in 597 BCE who had joined earlier Jews living there, that the el Ghriba Synagogue has an equally ancient date, and that some of this community assisted the Phoenicians in establishing Carthage.

One theory has espoused the idea that, the destruction of Tyre, Sidon, and Carthage created a Phoenician diaspora not unlike that of the Jews and that the puzzling disappearance of Phoenicians may have been due to the attraction they might have felt for a similarly dispersed people, leading to conversion to Judaism. A late source from the 10th century, Josippon, states that Titus had settled some 50,000 Jews in North Africa, and ibn Khaldun (1332–1406), who himself came from Tunisia stated that several Berber tribes he had encountered had converted to Judaism. The Talmud conserves the names of four rabbis of Carthage, with the Jerusalem Talmud mentioning Abba/Ba 4 times, and Hinena (called Hanan in the Babylonian Talmud) twice. There is dispute over the interpretation of these references, with one hypothesis suggesting the references must refer to the flourishing Jewish community in Cartagena, Spain, a Punic settlement whose name is identical with that of Carthage.

The French archaeologist Alfred Louis Delattre uncovered a large Jewish necropolis dating to the early 3rd century CE at Gammarth consisting of 105 chambers, each with roughly 15 loculi, which would have allowed burial for 1500 people. The Jewishness of the site is proven by symbols of the Temple menorah, shofar, lulav and etrog. The epigraphic evidence is predominantly in Latin, with one name, Tibereius, indicating a possible origin in Tiberias in Syria Palaestina. The pagan funerary sign dis manibus, elsewhere disliked by Jews, occurs in one inscription. The overall impression gained from this evidence is that Jews in and around Carthage shared with gentiles a common language, funerary formulae, and ornamentation, differing only in their recourse to synagogues, occasional use of Jewish symbols and their separation at death by interment in a separate cemetery.

Tertullian, though at times venting his ire at Jews, stating that synagogues were "fountains of persecution" and that Jews harassed Christians (a suggestion for which there is no evidence from North Africa at that time), nonetheless in his remarks on the community at Carthage also shows that they earned his grudging respect.

Some accounts state that after Gaiseric sacked Rome, he took the holy vessels that Titus had looted from the Temple in Jerusalem with him to the new Vandal capital in Carthage, where the Byzantine general Belisarius retrieved them when he won the city back in 533 and had them transported to Constantinople. When a wise Jew pointed out the danger of harbouring these vessels, which had brought downfall to Rome and Carthage, Justinian was so unnerved he had them sent to Jerusalem, where they were stored in a church.

== Quotation attributed to the Carthaginian rabbi Abba ben Isaac ==
Rabbi Abba bar Rav Yitzḥak says that Rav Ḥisda says, and some say that Rav Yehuda says that Rav says: The gentiles living from Tyre to Carthage recognize the Jewish people, their religion, and their Father in Heaven. But those living to the west of Tyre and to the east of Carthage recognize neither the Jewish people nor their Father in Heaven.

— Abba of Carthage in Tractate Menaḥot 110a, cited by Isaac Abarbanel in the Rosh Amanah "Principles of Faith"

== See also ==
- Maghrebi Jews
- History of the Jews in Tunisia
- History of the Jews in Morocco
- History of the Jews in Algeria
- History of the Jews in Libya
