= History of the Jews in Libya =

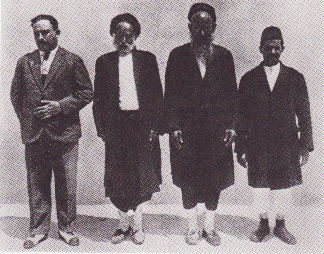
Secretary of the community board of Benghazi (left) and members of the rabbinic court

The history of the Jews in Libya stretches back to the 3rd century BCE, when Cyrenaica was under Greek rule. The Jewish population of Libya, a part of the Sephardi-Maghrebi Jewish community, continued to populate the area continuously until modern times. During World War II, Libya's Jewish population was subjected to antisemitic laws by the Fascist Italian regime and deportations by both the Italian and German armies.

After the war, anti-Jewish violence caused many Jews to leave the country, principally for Israel, though significant numbers moved to Italy and North America. Under Colonel Muammar Gaddafi, who ruled the country from 1969 to 2011, the situation deteriorated further, eventually leading to the emigration of the remaining Jewish population. The last Jew in Libya, 80-year-old Rina Debach, left the country in 2003.

== Ancient history ==
=== Ptolematic period ===
The area of Libya was divided in classical times into three distinct geographical regions, Tripolitania, Cyrenaica and the Fezzan. Jewish migration was predominantly along the coastlines, and historically the vast majority of the Jewish population was concentrated in the western, Tripolitania province. Early Jewish settlement in Cyrenaica, a region with significant Greek influence in what is now northeast Libya, likely stemmed from their substantial presence in neighboring Ptolemaic Egypt. After Ptolemy I Soter's conquest of Judea, many Jews were initially taken as captives but were later freed, while others emigrated to Egypt voluntarily, attracted by economic opportunities and Ptolemy's tolerant policies. In 312 BCE, Ptolemy settled many Jews in Cyrenaica to strengthen his kingdom.

The historical record provides only limited information on the development of Jewish communities in Cyrenaica during the Ptolemaic period. One notable figure from this time is Jason of Cyrene, who wrote a historical account of the Maccabean revolt during the second century BCE. This account was later summarized in 2 Maccabees. While Jason's work suggests advanced education and an interest in Jewish nationalistic causes, it is unclear whether his perspectives were representative of broader Cyrenaican Jewry. Nonetheless, his writings suggest there may have been some level of interaction between Judea and Cyrenaica during this period.

In 146 BCE inscriptions found at Benghazi and elsewhere in Libya, give details about wealthy, well established and organised Jewish communities.

=== Roman period ===
During the Roman era, Jewish communities in Cyrenaica became more prominent, with inscriptions revealing their integration into civic life. By the early imperial period, Jews held various positions within the city administrations of Cyrene and other cities. This integration is reflected in inscriptions that document Jews serving in civic roles and acquiring citizenship.

There is evidence of Jews living in Benghazi from 13 BCE. They were considered citizens, but were ruled by a Jewish archon unlike the rest of the Jews in that area. Ein Targhuna, near Massah, is believed to have been a Jewish military settlement during the Roman period. The site features Jewish rock-cut tombs, a menorah carving, possibly belonging to Jewish troops relocated by Augustus.

Augustus granted Cyrene's Jewish population certain privileges through Flavius, the governor of the province. At the time, they maintained close contact with the Jews in Jerusalem. In 73 CE, during the First Jewish–Roman War in Judaea, there was also a revolt by the Jewish community in Cyrene led by Jonathan the Weaver, which was quickly suppressed by the governor Catullus. Jonathan was denounced to the governor of Pentapolis. In vengeance, the Romans killed him and many wealthy Jews in Cyrene. Several Libyan Jews from around this period are known today, such as Jason of Cyrene, whose work is the source of the Second Book of Maccabees, and Simon of Cyrene, who is believed to have carried the cross of Jesus as he was taken to his crucifixion.

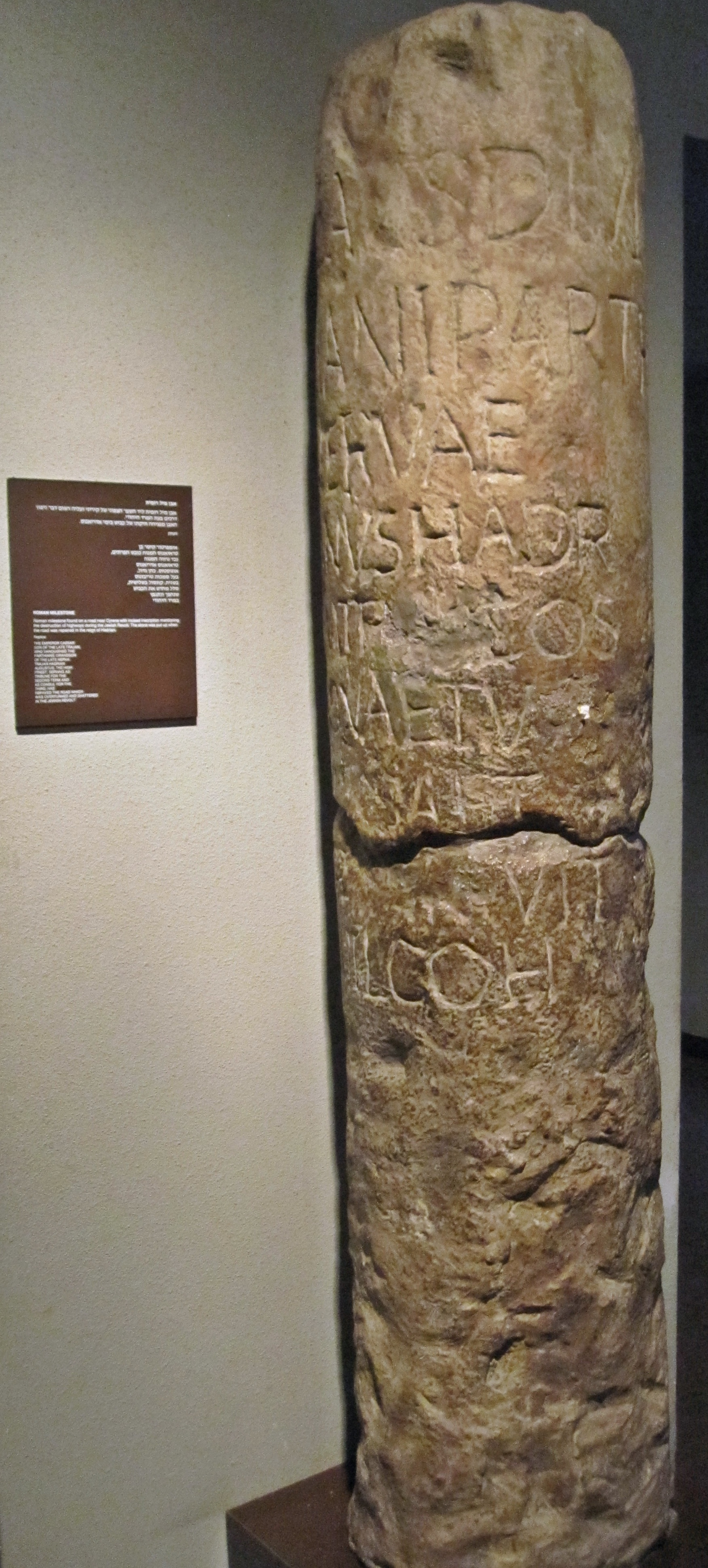
Replica of a Roman milestone found at Shahhat, with an inscription documenting the repair of a road damaged during the Diaspora Revolt (115–117 CE)

The Diaspora Revolt of 115–117 CE saw Jewish communities in Cyrenaica, Egypt, and Cyprus rising in rebellion during Trajan's reign. This revolt had a messianic dimension, as one ancient source refers to Lukuas, the leader of the Jewish rebels in Libya, as "king," suggesting that the uprising evolved from an ethnic conflict into a nationalist movement with messianic aspirations for political independence. It is possible that the rebels in Libya, whose actions caused widespread destruction and included a raid into Egypt, were attempting to initiate a broader movement aimed at a large-scale return to Judea. Ancient sources depict the revolt as exceptionally brutal, with reports of mutilation and cannibalism; however, contemporary scholars often view these accounts as exaggerated for rhetorical effect. In Cyrene and its surroundings, the revolt inflicted extensive damage on civic infrastructure, temples, and roads, necessitating substantial reconstruction by Hadrian at the beginning of his reign. The revolt's suppression by Roman general Marcius Turbo resulted in widespread devastation and the near-total expulsion of Jews from Cyrenaica. While there may be some evidence of Jewish farmers in rural Marmarica by the end of the second century, a significant Jewish presence was not re-established in Cyrenaica until the 4th century.

According to Jewish tradition, after the Bar-Kokhba revolt of 132-135 AD, the Romans deported twelve boatloads of Jews from Judea to Cyrenaica. Approximately half a million Jews are thought to have already been living there at the time. Most lived in farming villages while those by the sea were often sailors. Many others were potters, stonemasons, weavers, and merchants.

In the region of Tripolitania, Jewish presence is also traced to antiquity. Chronicler Mordehai HaCohen (1856–1929) recorded a tradition that the community of Yafran began after Jerusalem's destruction in 70 CE, when 30,000 Jewish captives were reportedly sold to Bedouins in Yafran by Titus's generals.

=== Late Antiquity ===
During the fourth and fifth centuries, Jewish communities re-emerged in Cyrenaica, likely composed of immigrants from Palestine and the re-established Jewish community in nearby Egypt.

== Middle Ages ==
Al-Bakri, an Arab Andalusian geographer writing in the second half of the 10th century, mentions a Jewish population inhabiting the town of Jadu, in Tripolitania.

The Spaniards, who conquered Libya in 1510 and held it for a brief period, drove some of the Jews to the mountain areas of Gharian and Tajura. Others were taken as prisoners and tortured under the laws of the inquisition, whilst others were taken to Naples and sold as slaves.

== Modern times ==
=== Ottoman rule ===
The sense of mistrust, resentment and hostility towards a minority, reflecting also economic and religious differences remained latent, aside from occasional explosions of violence. The practice of usury was the main cause of animosity. The standard interest rate for pledged monies was 60% per annum, which could reach as high as 90% for smaller amounts of the kind Arab hinterland borrowers depended on. General discontent spread during the final years of the Karamanli dynasty coinciding with a notable economic downturn, in what long remained a mere subsistence economy.

The return of Ottoman rule to Tripoli in 1835 brought about an improvement in both the legal and economic conditions for Jews in the area. In the wake of the Ottoman Tanzimat reforms, the Jewish community was courted, and with the appointment of Eliyahu Bekhor ben Raphael Joseph Ḥazzan as their Hakham Bashi (1872–1886), provided with lavish funding. The Jewish population witnessed a sharp rise in growth so that by 1911, well over a century after the ravages of the 1785 plague which decimated both communities, Jews, exclusive of those who were considered foreign immigrants (the wealthier Dutch, Italian, Austrian and Spanish Jewish traders), constituted 14,283 of the 523,716 natives of the Tripolitanian region. The growth of markets led to a trend towards urbanization and the growth of new settlements in both communities. The central Ottoman authorities were favourably disposed to the Jews, and earlier guarantees to the Jewish community were strengthened by an Imperial Decree in 1865 that accorded them an autonomy, and endowed local rabbis with the right to independently represent their community.

Established along the main trade routes, Libyan Jews assumed an important role in credit by loans and deferral of incumbent payments, and were so trusted that Arab women would allow Jewish commercial agents access to their homes, something denied to other Muslims. The small scattered hinterland Jewish communities were not beneficiaries of these general improvements.

Some structural vexations nonetheless remained, to create difficulties for these flourishing communities in the later 19th century: namely, a laxness in the application of Islamic law, often arbitrary, and the venality of local officials. A further issue was the expanding wealth gap opening up between resident foreign Jews and the poorer indigenous Jews. After 1861, pressure from European powers, duly informed of abuses by the Alliance Israélite Universelle (AIU), mitigated the impact of some abuses, and the growth of charities and schooling alleviated stress, though conducive to a certain fatalistic passiveness, which was considered to have traditionally marked these communities, whose ‘vegetative’ superstitiousness, and lifestyle in highly cramped and disease-ridden ghetto (hara) hovels, together with ignorance, was complained of by several AIU reports.

Overall, by the end of the 19th century, while economic conditions did improve both for the hinterland and richer Tripoli communities of Jews, conditions for the urban masses of Jews worsened, exacerbated by both a high birth-rate and the influx of Jews from the outlying territory, which also led to a deterioration of relations with Muslims. Complaints about usury by the latter were often associated with a perception that wealthy foreign Jews had undue influence over the government. As modernizing changes increased their pace, many Jews assumed a mediating role between the crumbling order institutional world and the emerging new society, and bore the brunt for the upheavals of change.

Sectors of the Muslim community itself, exposed to emergent trends in Europe, began to develop their own rudimentary form of nationalism, taking on board the anti-Semitism which tainted the latter. The government, though it did impose a special tax on those who did not do military service, opposed this drift in order to balance the pressure of European expansion, by recognizing the importance of developing the local economy where wealthy Jews played a significant role. A number of international incidents also contributed to local outbursts of xenophobia, like the French occupation of Tunisia and the Russo-Turkish War (1877–1878) The resulting bigotry occasioned riotous outbreaks which targeted Jews, who were increasingly viewed as allied to European interests.

The aggravated conditions in the late Ottoman period in Libya led to a marked rise in intolerance and contempt as anti-Jewish sentiments, grew in popularity. Incidents of arson, murder, robbery and looting increased, with local authorities and rulers failing to apply the laws protecting Jews laid out by the central ottoman government. Illustrative examples of such attitudes were the sacking of synagogues in Misrata in 1864 and 1897; an arson attack on that in Zliten in 1867, for which damages were later paid. In 1880 the synagogue at Az-Zāwiyah was plundered. Due to the negligence of the authorities such as the resident walis in punishing the culprits, frequent attacks on Jewish families and theft of their property led to cases of murders in reports for 1880 and 1897. In 1870, a Jewish notable, Saul Raccah was murdered. His killer was sentenced to 15 years imprisonment but later amnestied. A Jewish moneylender was murdered in 1880. Exceptions to such abuses are known. An incident of plundering at Amruss in 1901 lead to full redress and a return of stolen property thanks to the intervention of the local wali.

During the Ottoman period, Jewish families from Tripoli were attracted to Benghazi. This period gave new life and impetus to the Libyan Jewish community.

In 1745 epidemics and poverty drove out the inhabitants, but around 1,750 members of the previous Jewish community returned and reconstructed the community, which began to flourish with the arrival of Jewish families from Italy.

In the 18th and 19th centuries Benghazi had 400 Jewish families divided into two groups, those of the town and the surrounding region and those who were born in Tripoli and Italy, they both recognised the authority of one rabbi, but each had its own synagogue.

The Muslim brotherhood of the Sanusiya was well-disposed toward the Jews of Benghazi, appreciating their economic-mercantile contributions and their peaceful attitude. The community enjoyed a complete freedom, and were not forced to live in a special quarter. Because of their commercial activity the town became an important trading centre for Europe and Africa.

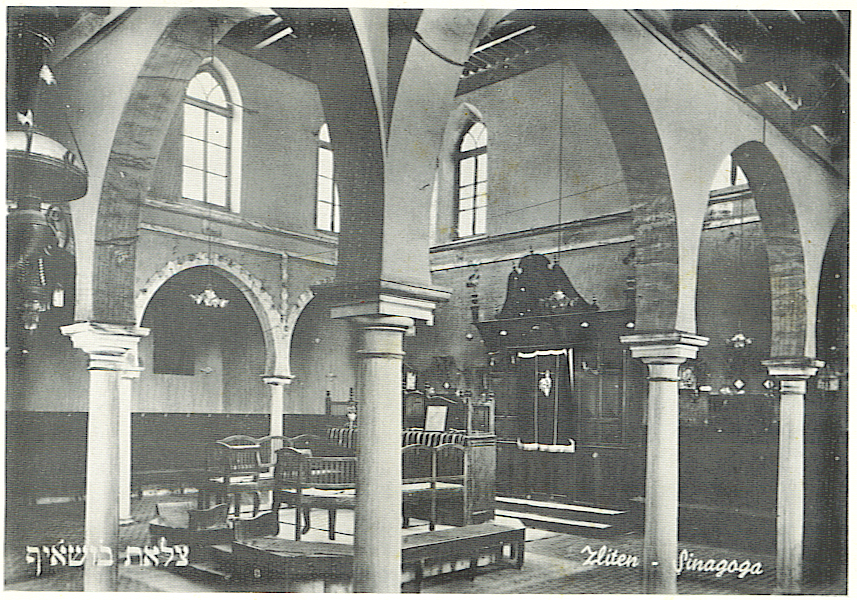
The Slat Abn Shaif Synagogue in Zliten before World War II

=== Italian rule ===
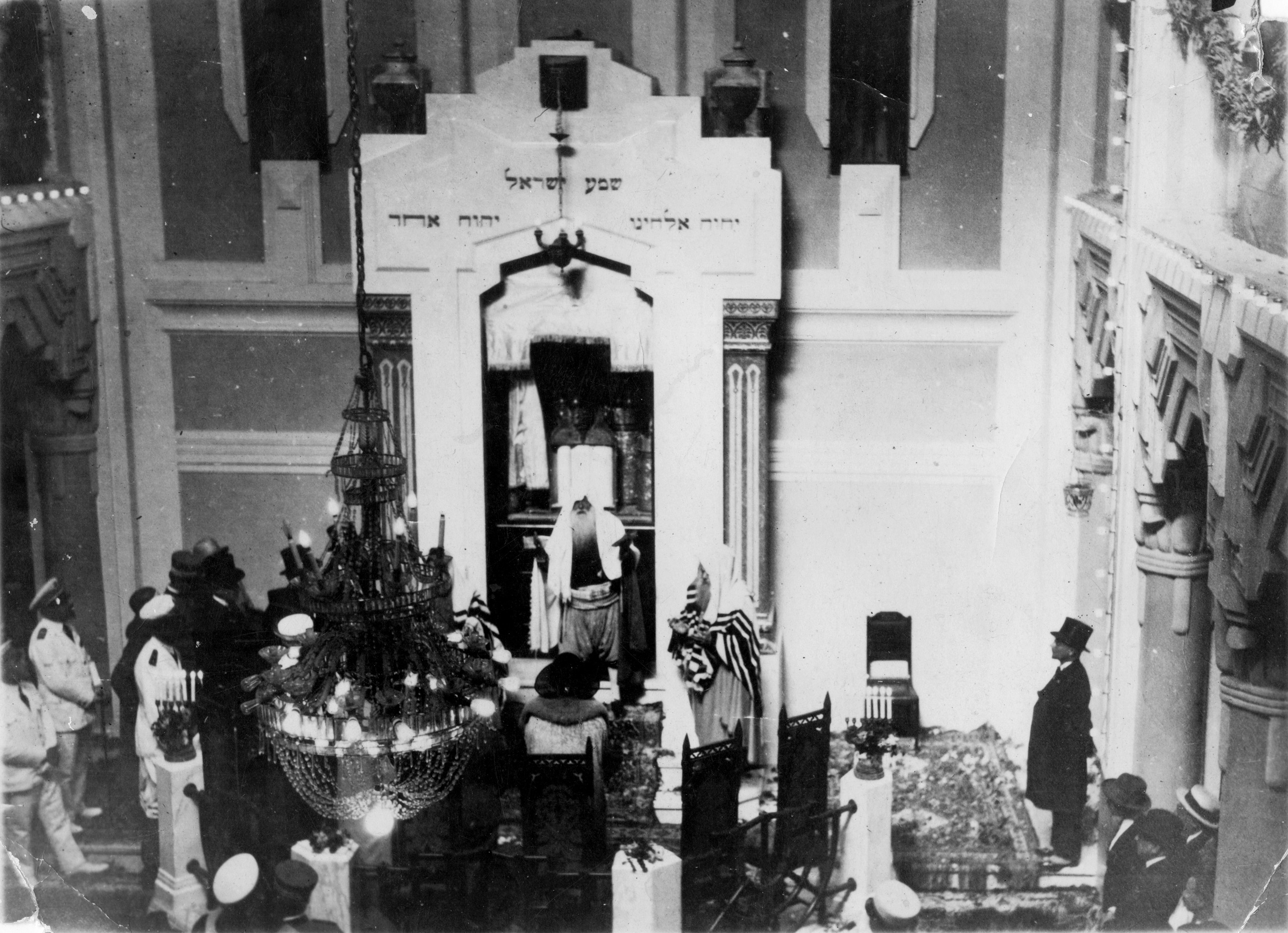
Visit of the King of Italy Vittorio Emanuele III to Dar Bishi Synagogue in Tripoli in 1928

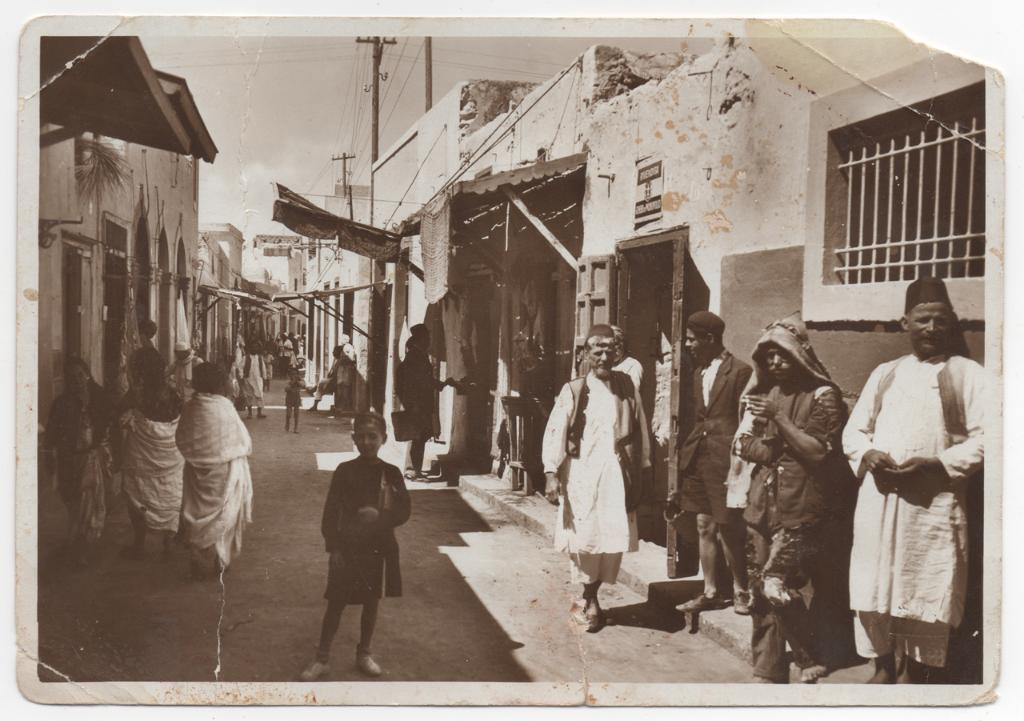
Jewish Quarter (Hara) of Tripoli circa 1930

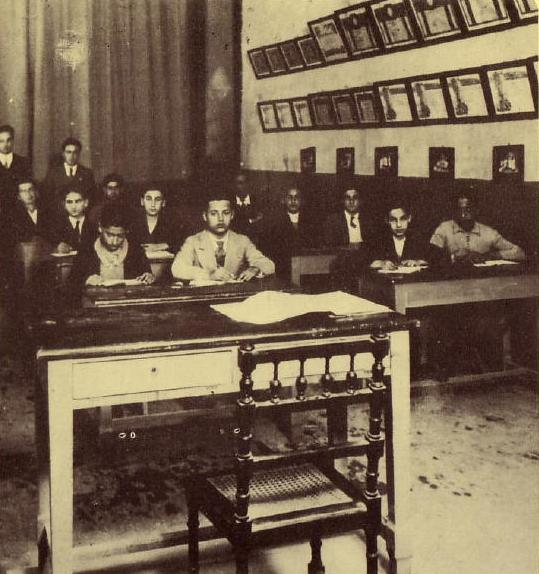
A Libyan Jewish classroom in Benghazi Synagogue before World War II

In 1903, the records of the Alliance Israelite Universelle show 14,000 Jews living in Tripoli and 2,000 in Benghazi. A further 4,480 dwelt in the surrounding towns. In comparison to Zionist activities in other Arab countries, Zionism started early in Libya and was extensive, it was followed by many activities such as exchanging letters concerning Zionism matters between Benghazi and Tripoli during the period 1900–1904. An organization had been set up for the dissemination of the Hebrew in Tripoli and young people from the Benghazi community came to study there. The meeting between the young Jews of Benghazi and the Tripolitanian Zionists bore fruit in the form of a “Talmud Torah” which was an evening school in Tripoli.

In 1911, Libya was colonised by Italy. By 1931, there were 21,000 Jews living in the country (4% of the total population of 550,000), mostly in Tripoli. But, in late 1939, the Fascist Italian regime began passing anti-Semitic laws. As a result of these laws, Jews were fired from government jobs, some were dismissed from government schools, and their citizenship papers were stamped with the words "Jewish race."

In the 1920s a few incidents linked to the Arab-Jewish conflict in Palestine were reported. The incidents that occurred in Tripoli and Benghazi, those which occurred in Tripoli were not so serious compared to the ones in Benghazi. According to Gustavo Calo, the chief rabbi of Benghazi, there was actually an attempted pogrom but according to the opinion of Elia Fargion the president of the community, this assessment was exaggerated.

Data from 1931 indicates that spoken Italian was relatively widespread across the Jewish population. In Benghazi, 67.1 percent of Jewish men and 40.8 percent of Jewish women spoke Italian, compared to 34.5 percent of Arab men and 1.6 percent of Arab women.

In 1934, a chapter of Ben-Yehuda was established in Benghazi, first as a soccer team and later with cultural activities, such as the commemoration of Jewish holidays and Zionist Festivities.

In the late 1930s, Fascist anti-Jewish laws were gradually enforced, and Jews were subject to terrible repression.

Until 1936 life under Italian rule proceeded peacefully for the Jews. In 1936, however, the Italians began to enforce fascist legislation, aimed at modernising social and economic structures, based on conditions current in Italy. With the implementation of anti-Jewish racial legislation in late 1938, Jews were removed from municipal councils, public offices, and state schools and their papers were stamped with the words "Jewish race."

German influence in Libya had been felt since 1938. However, Germany's direct involvement in the colonial authorities’ affairs and management did not completely materialise until 1941. It was only when Italy entered the war in 1940 that Libya became subjected to direct Fascist-Nazi collaboration and “Nazi-Style” deportations.

Despite this repression, 25% of the population of Tripoli was still Jewish in 1941 and 44 synagogues were maintained in the city. In 1942, German troops fighting the Allies in North Africa occupied the Jewish quarter of Benghazi, plundering shops and deporting more than 2,000 Jews across the desert. Sent to work in labor camps, more than one-fifth of this group of Jews perished. Jews were concentrated in the cities of Tripoli and Benghazi, with small communities in Bayda and Misrata.

The worst experience for Libyan Jews in the war was the internment of Cyrenaican Jews in Giado, a concentration camp located 235 kilometres from Tripoli. In January 1942, the Italian authorities began to apply Mussolini’s “Sfollamento” (evacuation) order to Libyan Jews. Mussolini ordered the Jews of Benghazi, Derna, Tobruk, Barce, Susa and other towns in the region to be sent to a concentration camp in Gharian in retaliation. An eyewitness described these horrifying moments: “In the synagogue they started hanging up lists every day of 20-30 families that had to leave...They took Jews from Benghazi and from the vicinity: Derna, Brace, Tobruk...The journey took five days. We travelled about 2,000 km. from Benghazi to Giado. They took us like animals to the slaughter house. Forty people in each truck and each truck had two Italian policemen. They took only Jews. According to the rumour it was the Germans who gave the order”.

In June 1942, the execution of Mussolini's orders was completed and all Cyrenaican Jews were transferred to Giado.

The living conditions in the camp were deplorable, bringing about infection and illness and, consequently, plagues that killed numerous people in the camp. They were buried on a valley nearby that used to be a burial place of Jews hundreds of years ago.

In addition to the camp's poor conditions, the behaviour of the Italian officers did not spare any type of humiliation, oppression and abuse, especially on Friday nights when the Maresciallo patrolled the buildings and saw the special food of the Sabbath, he used to kick it and spill it on the floor or urinate on it and thus a few families remained without food for the whole Sabbath. (4)

=== Allied control and after World War II ===
On January 24, 1943, the British liberated the camp and immediately undertook emergency measures to control the plague of typhus and lice that already killed 562 of its inhabitants. The British military decided to evacuate Giado between the spring and summer of 1943. The Jews were first evacuated from the camp to better housing in the vicinity, to receive medical care and be properly fed. Then gradually each week, a number of families was selected to be put on trucks and sent back to their homes. The expenses for transport of these Jews back to Cyrenaica and the initial assistance were financed by the American Jewish Joint Distribution Committee.

Upon the establishment of British rule on January 23, 1943, the Jewish community was in a deplorable economic, social and psychological state. The demeaning effects of the Italian racial laws, war and concentration camps took a heavy toll on the Jewish community.

The British boosted the spirits of the Jews with promises to repatriate them to their homes in Benghazi, and giving them the chance to rehabilitate their lives. The survivors also met Jewish soldiers from Mandatory Palestine serving in the British military during this time. This was allegedly the first time that Yishuv soldiers in British service came into contact with Holocaust survivors during the war, and the Libyan Jews were said to have seen the Jewish soldiers as saviors. After the full repatriation of Benghazi Jews it was reported that there were 3,400 Jews in Benghazi (before the war, in June 1939 the Jewish community of Benghazi numbered 3,653). Yet many of the Jews who returned to Benghazi were unemployed, while those with jobs were unable to support themselves on what they earned. The Benghazi Jewish community suffered more than any other Jewish community in Libya since it was hit harder by the perils of war.

==== 1945 anti-Jewish Tripolitania pogrom ====
Some of the worst anti-Jewish violence occurred in the years following the liberation of North Africa by Allied troops. From 5 to 7 November 1945, more than 140 Jews were killed and many more injured in a pogrom in Tripolitania. The rioters looted nearly all of the city's synagogues and destroyed five of them, along with hundreds of homes and businesses. In June 1948, anti-Jewish rioters killed another 12 Jews and destroyed 280 Jewish homes. This time, however, the Libyan Jewish community had prepared to defend itself. Jewish self-defence units fought back against the rioters, preventing more deaths.

Both in November 1945 and June 1948 the Jews of Benghazi did not suffer anti-Jewish pogroms at the hands of Arabs similar to the Jews of Tripoli, though small-scale incidents did occur. Thus, several Jews were beaten up in mid-June 1948, a shop was looted, and a fire broke out in a synagogue, but the local police introduced order and there was no need for the British Army to intervene.

Once emigration to Israel was permitted in early 1949, the majority of the community of 2,500 Jews in Benghazi emigrated to Israel through the end of 1951.

The general environment during the years after the emigration to Israel, was generally positive, no special events, riots or pogrom occurred during this period between 1949 and 1967 and it estimated that 200 Jews Lived in Benghazi during that time.

In the late 1940s, some 40,000 Jews lived in Libya. The Libyan Jewish community suffered great insecurity during this period. The declaration of founding of Israel in 1948, as well as Libya's independence from Britain in 1951 and subsequent admission into the Arab League, led many Jews to emigrate. From 1948 to 1951, and especially after emigration became legal in 1949, 30,972 Jews moved to Israel.

=== Kingdom of Libya ===
On 31 December 1958, the Jewish Community Council was dissolved by law. In 1961, a new law was passed requiring a special permit to prove true Libyan citizenship, which was, however, denied to all but six Jewish inhabitants of the country. Additional laws were enacted allowing the seizure of property and assets of Libyan Jews who had immigrated to Israel.

In 1964, letters to US Senator Jacob Javits from Jewish United States Air Force personnel serving on Wheelus Air Base, a US Air Force facility in Libya, revealed the extent of antisemitic sentiment in the country. The letters revealed that children and dependents of Jewish personnel living off-base had to conceal their Jewish identities, fear for the physical safety of children caused the cancelation of a Jewish Sunday school program, and that the US Air Force was pressuring Jewish personnel to hide their Jewish identities and censored all material that referenced Jews, Judaism, or Israel to avoid offending most of the local population.

==== 1967 Tripoli anti-Jewish pogrom ====
By 1967, the Jewish population of Libya had decreased to 7,000. After the Six-Day War between Israel and its Arab neighbors, Libyan Jews were once again the target of anti-Jewish riots. During these attacks, rioters killed 18 people and more were injured.

Leaders of the Jewish community then asked King Idris I to allow the entire Jewish population to "temporarily" leave the country; he consented, even urging them to leave. Through an airlift and the aid of several ships, the Italian Navy helped evacuate more than 6,000 Jews to Rome in one month. A few scores of Jews remained in Libya.

The evacuees were forced to leave their homes, their businesses and most of their possessions behind. Of those evacuated to Italy, about 1,300 immigrated to Israel, 2,200 stayed in Italy, and most of the rest went to the United States. The Libyan Jews who remained in Italy primarily stayed in Rome, becoming an influential part of the local Jewish community.

=== Gaddafi's rule ===
By the time Colonel Muammar Gaddafi came to power in 1969, roughly 200 Jews remained in Libya. Under his rule, all Jewish men were arrested and taken to police stations. All Jewish property was confiscated, and all debts to Jews were cancelled. In 1970, the Libyan government declared the Day of Expulsion, which celebrated the expulsion of British and Italians from Libya, a national holiday. Despite emigration being prohibited, most of the remaining Jews succeeded in escaping the country and by 1972, less than 40 Jews remained in Libya.

In 2002, the last known Jew in Libya, Esmeralda Meghnagi, died. In the same year, however, it was discovered that Rina Debach, a then 80-year-old Jewish woman who was born and raised in Tripoli but thought to be dead by her family in Rome, was still living in a nursing home in the country. With her ensuing departure for Rome, there were no more Jews in the country.

In 2004, Gaddafi indicated that the Libyan government would compensate Jews who were forced to leave the country and stripped of their possessions. In October of that year he met with representatives of Jewish organizations to discuss compensation. He did, however, insist that Jews who moved to Israel would not be compensated. Some suspected these moves were motivated by his son Saif al-Islam Gaddafi, who was considered to be the likely successor of his father. In the same year, Saif had invited Libyan Jews living in Israel back to Libya, saying that they are Libyans, and that they should "leave the land they took from the Palestinians."

On 9 December, Gaddafi also extended an invitation to Moshe Kahlon, the Deputy Speaker of the Knesset and son of Libyan immigrants, to Tripoli, purportedly to discuss Jewish property in Libya. On this occasion, he said:

We are not against Jews, but we have a problem with Zionism and Zionist leaders who oppress the Palestinians, and also you, Arabs of '48. We didn't massacre Jews, it was the west that did that. We gave them refuge. Occupation will bring disaster upon the Israeli entity, adding to his guests, We invited you because your voices are not being heard, and I want the world to hear you.

— Muammar Gaddafi

In 2010, it was claimed that Gaddafi had Jewish ancestry. Two Israeli women of Libyan-Jewish origin, a grandmother and granddaughter, came forward claiming to be relatives of Gaddafi. The grandmother claimed to be Gaddafi's second cousin. According to her, her grandmother had a sister who was married to a Jewish man, but ran away after he mistreated her, then converted to Islam and married Gaddafi's grandfather, a Muslim sheikh. The daughter of this marriage was Gaddafi's mother.

National Transitional Council Chairman Mustafa Abdul Jalil invited Libyan Jewish representative David Gerbi to meet with him after the World Organization of Libyan Jews designated him the group's official delegate to the governing body. Gerbi was reportedly warmly received by Berber rebels in the Nafusa Mountains in August 2011, and an Amazigh NTC official was quoted as saying, "We want to create closer relations between Muslims and Jews. Without Jews we will never be a strong country."

On 1 October 2011, Gerbi returned to Tripoli after 44 years of exile. With the help of a U.S. security contractor and the permission of NTC fighters and three local sheikhs, Gerbi hammered down a brick wall erected to block the entrance to the city's historic Dar Bishi Synagogue. He declared it a "historic day" for Libya and told the crowd gathered there, "This is for all those who suffered under Gaddafi." However, some residents remained wary of Gerbi's intentions and were quoted by a CNN reporter as expressing distrust for Jews. Gerbi's work on the synagogue ended abruptly after two days when the terms of permission fell into dispute.

== See also ==
- History of the Jews in Africa

=== Regions: ===
- History of the Jews in Central Africa
- History of the Jews in East Africa
- History of the Jews in North Africa
- History of the Jews in Southern Africa
- History of the Jews in West Africa

=== Topics: ===
- Maghrebi Jews
- History of the Jews in Carthage
- Cave-dwelling Jews
- Judeo-Tripolitanian Arabic

== Sources ==
- Applebaum, Shimon (1989). "ʿEin Targhuna". Judaea in Hellenistic and Roman Times: 66–69. doi:10.1163/9789004666641_009. ISBN 978-90-04-66664-1.
- Barclay, John M. G. (1996). Jews in the Mediterranean Diaspora: From Alexander to Trajan (323 BCE 117 CE). University of California Press. ISBN 978-0-520-21843-7.
- De Felice, Renzo (1985). Jews in an Arab Land: Libya, 1835–1970. University of California Press. ISBN 978-1-477-30409-9.
- Goldberg, Harvey E. (2012). "The notion of «Libyan Jewry» and its cultural-historical complexity". In Abecassis, Frédéric.; Slimani-Direche, . Karina; Aouad, . Rita (eds.). La bienvenue et l'adieu: Ruptures et recompositions. Vol. 2. Centre Jacques-Berque pour le développement des sciences humaines et sociales au Maroc. pp. 121–134. ISBN 978-9-954-10365-4.
- Roumani, Maurice M. (2008). The Jews of Libya: Coexistence, Persecution, Resettlement. Liverpool University Press. ISBN 978-1-802-07141-2.
- Schwartz, Stephen (13 December 2004). "Is Libya Contagious?". Washington Examiner.
