= 1967 Tripoli pogrom =

Anti-Jewish pogrom in Libya

- Part of the Six-Day War
- Location: Tripoli, Kingdom of Libya
- Date: June 1967
- Target: Jewish residents of Tripoli
- Attack type: Pogrom, looting, arson
- Deaths: 18
- Injuries: 25
- Perpetrators: Muslim mobs, police officers
- Defenders: Alitalia staff and crew members, Libyan secret police

The 1967 Tripoli pogrom was an anti-Jewish pogrom which took place in the Libyan city of Tripoli.

== Events ==
Two major pogroms had occurred in Libya prior to the riots of 1967: One in 1945 which killed over 140 people and one in 1948 that killed 14. The 1967 riot broke out in response to the Six-Day War between Israel and the Arab world. Arab leaders, especially Gamal Abdel Nasser, broadcast public statements calling for the destruction of Israel and in support for the Arab cause.

On the night of 5 June 1967, the same day the war started, a mob made up of hundreds of Muslim Libyans attacked Jewish homes and businesses in the city's Jewish Quarter, burning the Bet-El synagogue to the ground. Rioters attacked and set fire to Jewish houses, stores and cars, in addition to looting Jewish properties. A survivor recalled in 2017 he had been told that rioters at one point set a tire alight and threw it into a shop. Of all Jewish assets, both public and private, 60% were destroyed.

King Idris of Libya responded by ordering secret police to evacuate the Jewish population, transporting 3,000 Jews into a former British military base in the Libyan Desert. A group of rioters managed to disguise themselves as police officers during this operation, managing to kidnap and murder nine members of the Luzon family, including two parents and seven children. Staff and workers for the Italian Alitalia airline also reacted by shielding Jews who had fled to the airport for safety. Staff repelled rioting mobs from getting to the airport and managed to hand out numerous plane tickets to Jews. Alitalia's efforts were assisted by Chief Rabbi of Rome Elio Toaff and the Government of Italy.

In total, 18 Jews were killed in the pogrom and at least 25 injured.

The pogrom effectively ended the Jewish presence in Libya. 4,100 Jews managed to flee the country to Italy, including 2,500 who arrived to Rome via Alitalia. After Muammar Gaddafi took power in a 1969 coup, he ordered a persecution campaign against his country's Jewish minority, which led to the 100 remaining Jews fleeing the country.
