= Ein Targhuna =

Archaeological site in Massah, Libya

Coordinates: 32.748146°N 21.578376°E

Ein Targhuna (Arabic: عين طرغونيه) or Gasr Targhuna, locally also Khirbet al-Yahud (Arabic: خربة اليهود, lit. 'Ruin of the Jews'), is an archaeological site located near Massah, Libya. It is believed to have been a Jewish military settlement stationed there to defend the area from raids originating from the west during the Roman period.

== Geography ==
Ein Targhuna is located on the plateau of ancient Cyrenaica. In ancient times, it was traversed by the main Roman road connecting Ptolemais and Cyrene, with Cyrene being located 27 kilometers to the east. The site lies in the extreme northwestern angle of the area of springs, at the edge of a fertile zone. The northeast entrance to Wadi al-Kuf is located nearby.

One of the largest Roman forts in Libya, Gasr ibn Igdem, is located six kilometers to the southwest.

In ancient times, Ein Targhuna's strategic frontier location made it an ideal site for a unit of military settlers.

== Etymology ==
The name Ein Targhuna (locally pronounced Tarkhuna) may be derived from the Greek word ''Trachon,'' meaning "rocky place." It resembles the Aramaic form of the Greek name Trachonitis, an ancient name for Lajat, a rocky region of Hauran in modern-day Syria, known in Targum Jonathan as ''Targuna.'' Around 7 BCE, Herod settled a Babylonian Jewish unit of horse-archers near Trachonitis, led by Zamaris, to keep the Trachonite brigand bands in check.

"Hirbet al-Yahud", another name used by local Libyans, preserves the association of the site with a Jewish population.

== Archaeology ==
A menorah representation has been discovered cut into an ancient rock-cut road near the site. Additionally, a cippus (Roman boundary stone) is located nearby, recording the restoration of public land to the Roman state by the legate Acilius Strabo, who was active in 55-56 CE under Emperor Nero.

Ancient rock-cut tombs, described as Jewish, have also been found in the vicinity.

== Analysis ==
According to Applebaum, the Jewish findings, local Libyan association of the site with Jews, strategic importance, and etymological link to Trachonitis—where Herod settled Jewish troops—indicate that Augustus relocated this Jewish unit to Libya. He further suggests this relocation took place during the last decades of the first century BCE.

According to S. Safrai and M. Stern, Ein Targuna could be one of several Jewish katoikic villages in Libya during the late Ptolemaic period.
