= Abba of Carthage =

Abba of Carthage was a Jewish amora (scholar), who flourished at the end of the third century CE. His birthplace was Carthage, and it is incorrect to refer his surname to Cartagena in Spain or to a town of Armenia. He is frequently mentioned in the Jerusalem Talmud and in the haggadic traditions.
