= Massah, Libya =

Massa مسة
- Town
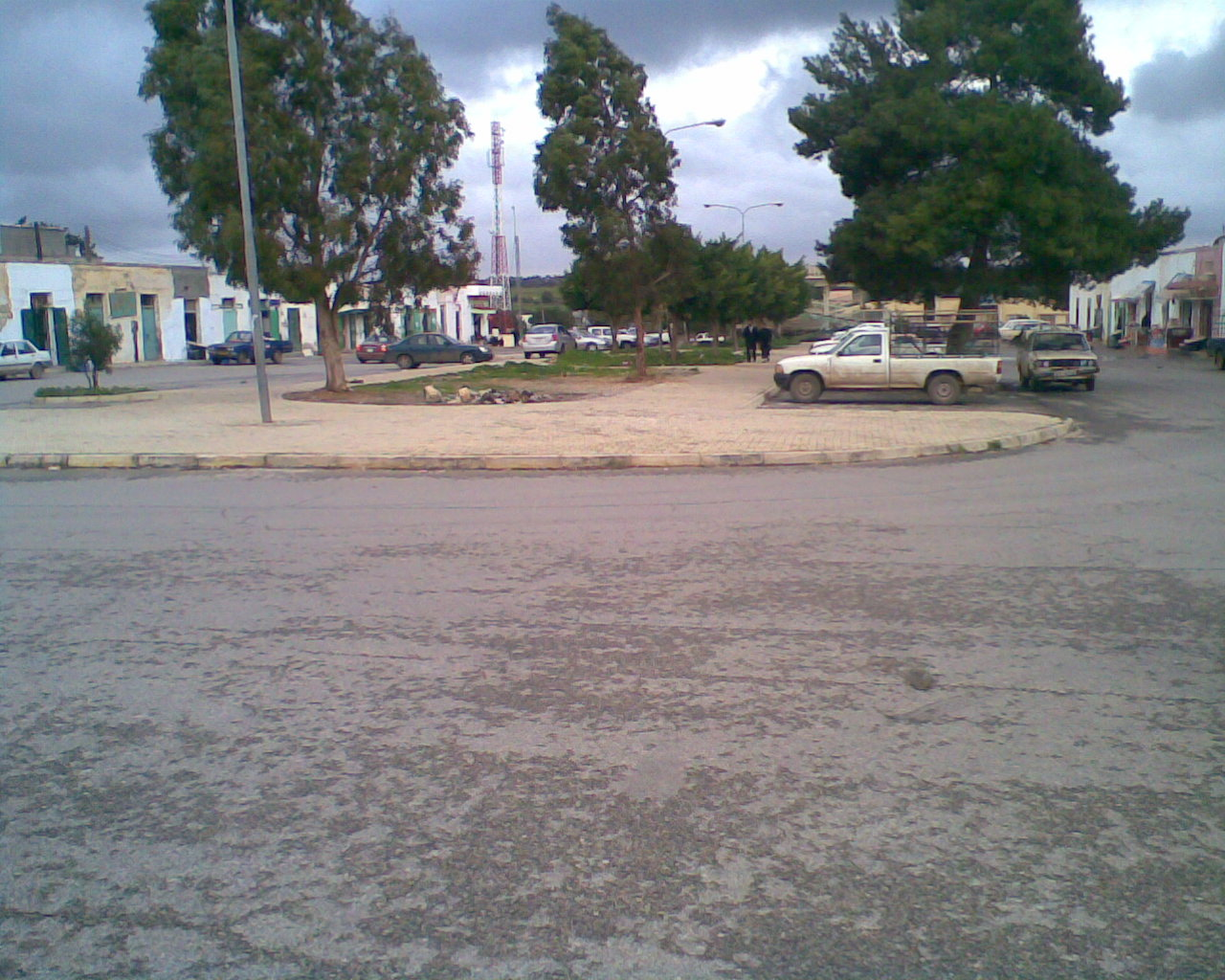

- Location in Libya
- Coordinates: 32°45′06″N 21°37′35″E
- Country: Libya
- Region: Cyrenaica
- District: Jebel el-Akhdar
- Time zone: UTC +2

Massa (Arabic: مسة or ماسة) is a town in the district of Jebel el-Akhdar in north-eastern Libya. It is located 10 km west of Beida. During Italian rule, the town was known as Villaggio Luigi Razza, probably after the late Italian politician of the same name.

There is an association in Massa named Ain as Saqr interested in gathering Libyan antiquities.

The ancient site of Ein Targhuna, believed to be a Jewish military settlement dating from the Roman period, is located 6 kilometers to the west.

== Photo gallery ==
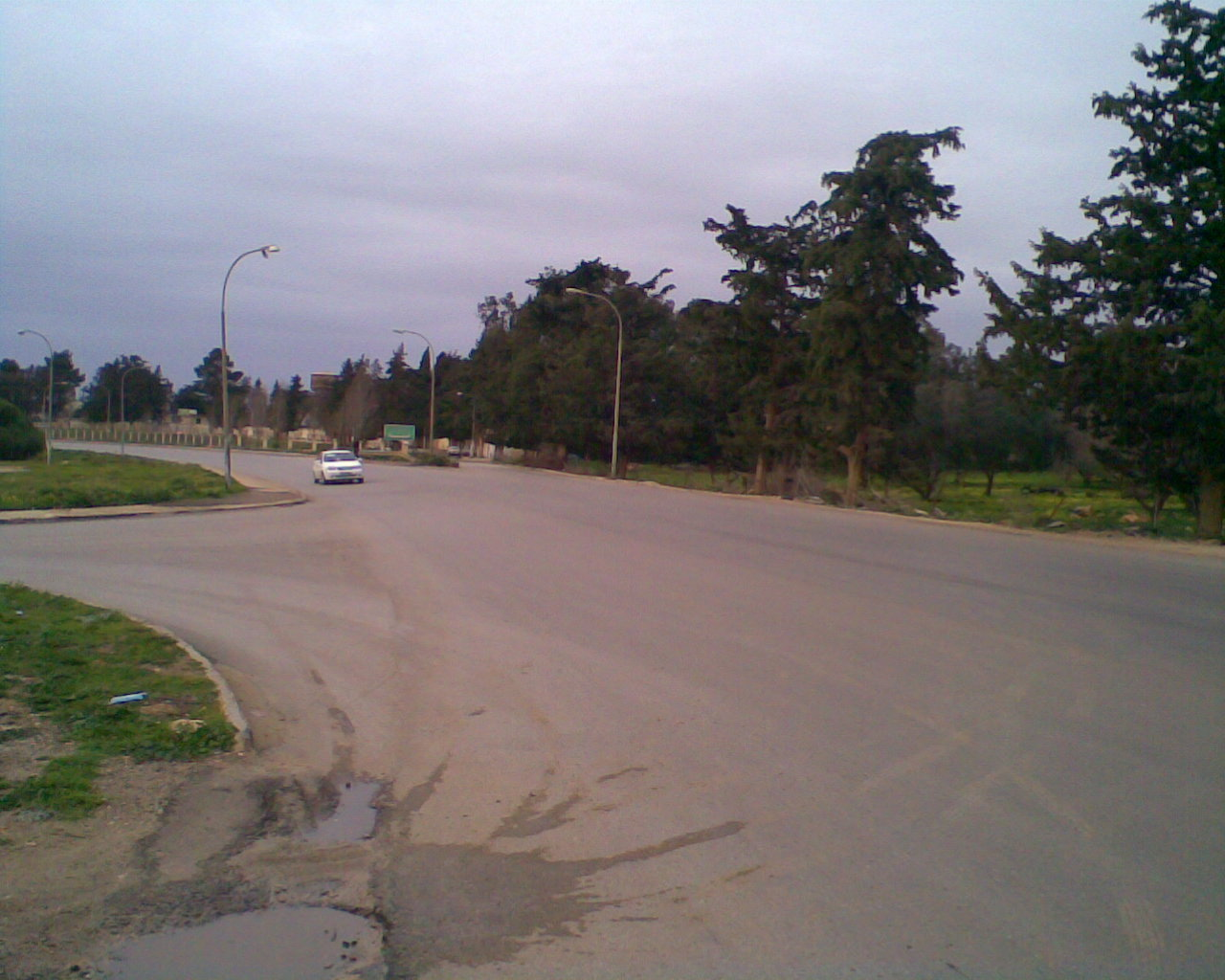
Massa's eastern gateway

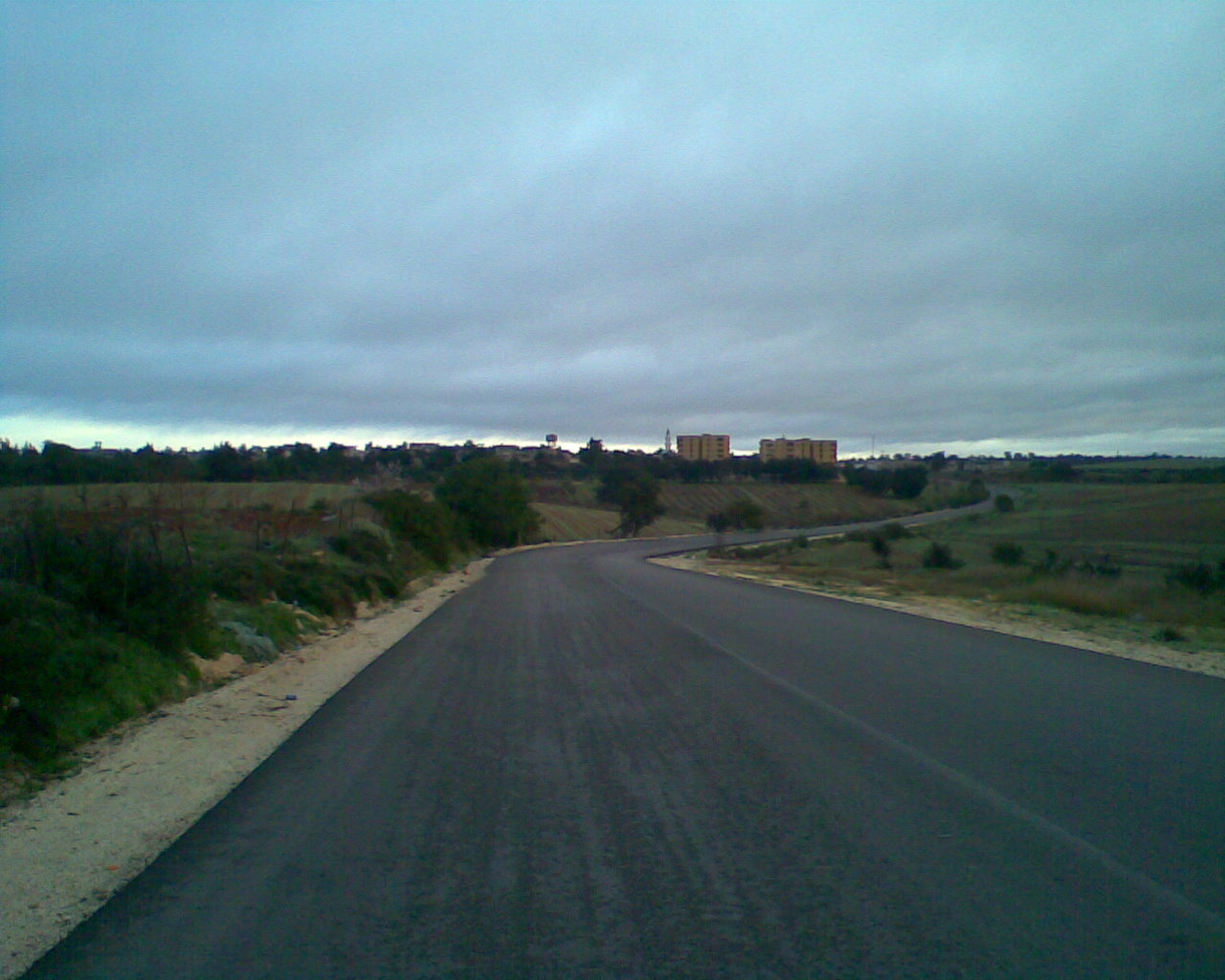
Massa's western gateway

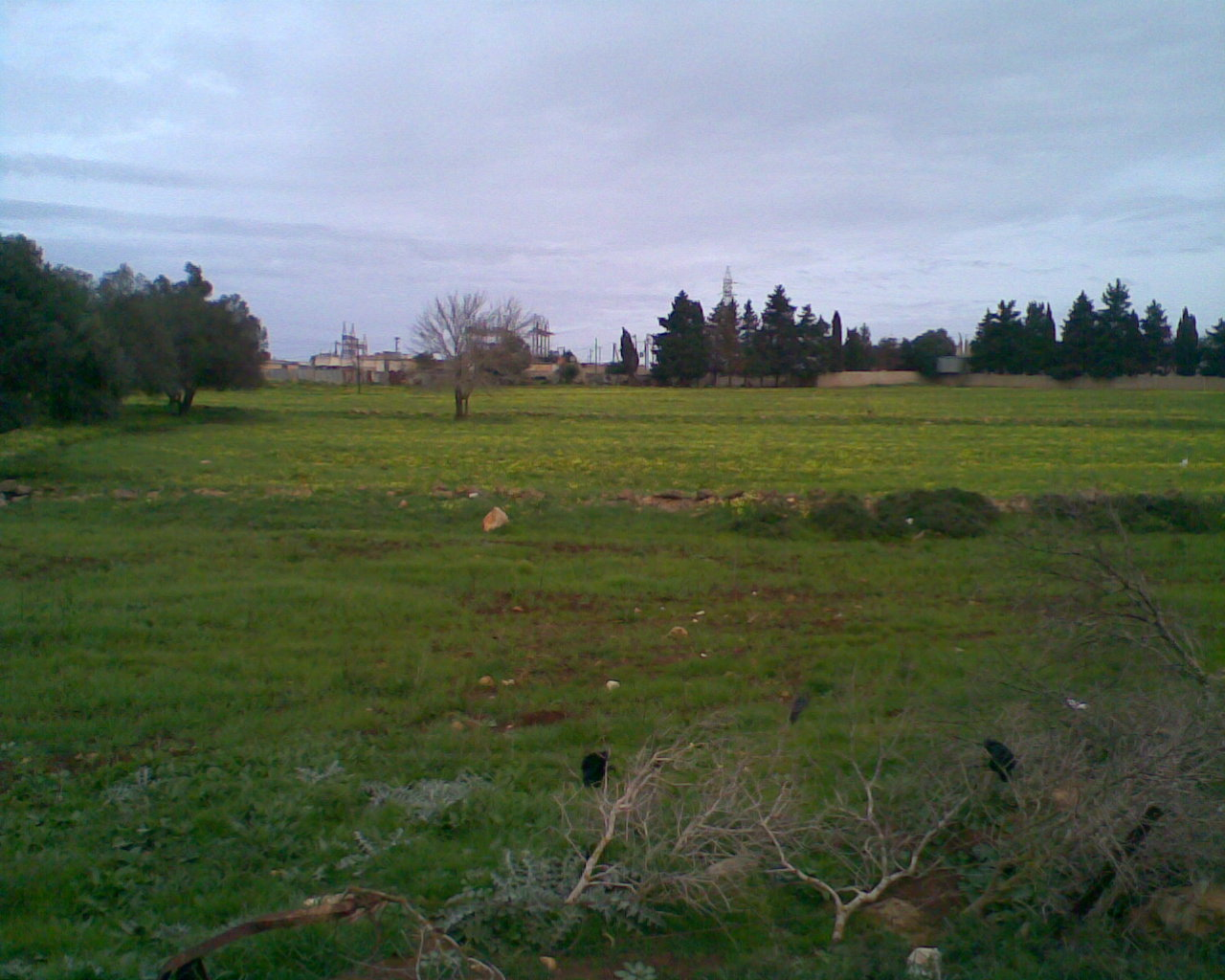
A farm in Massa

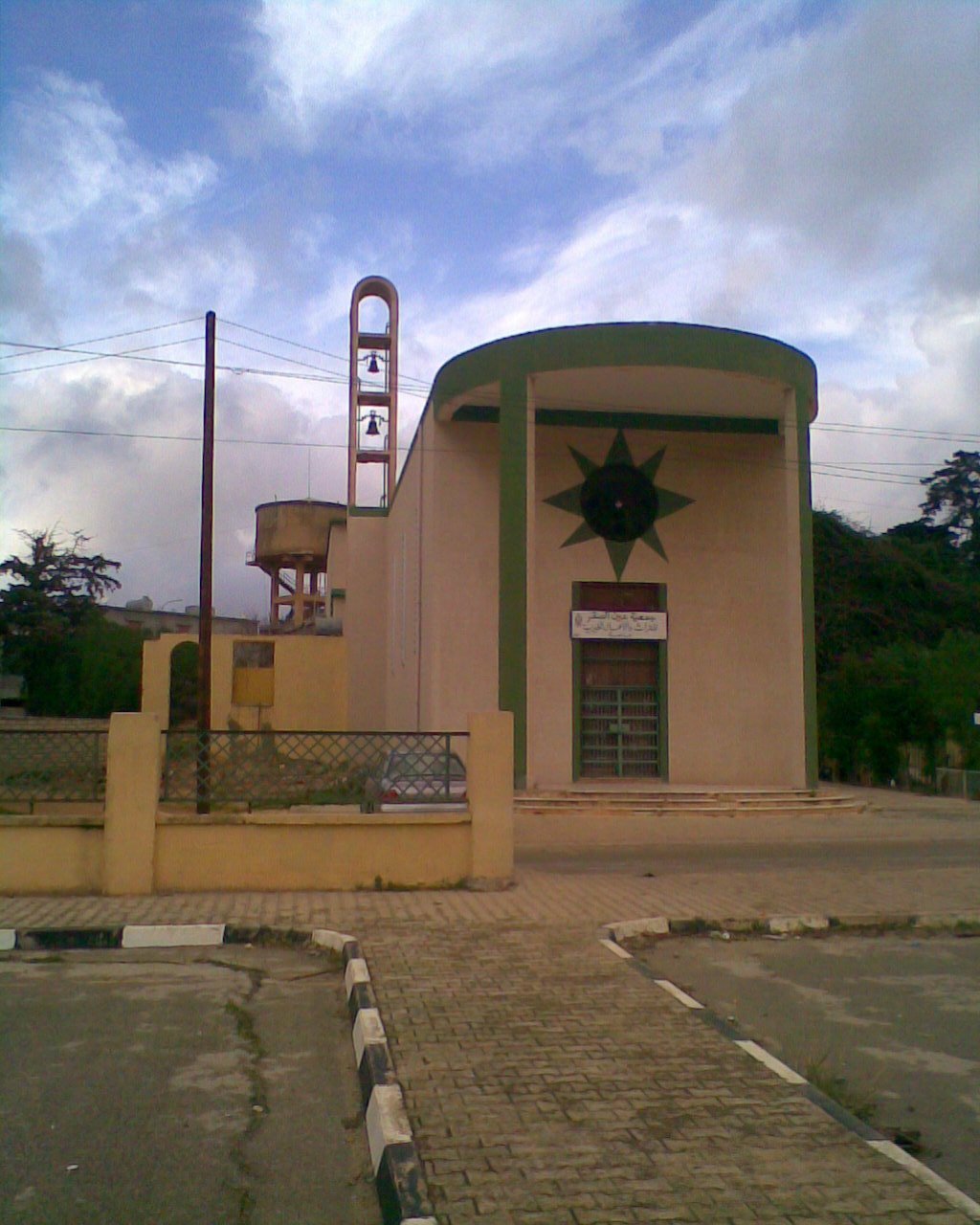
Ain as Saqr antiquities association (in an old Italian church)

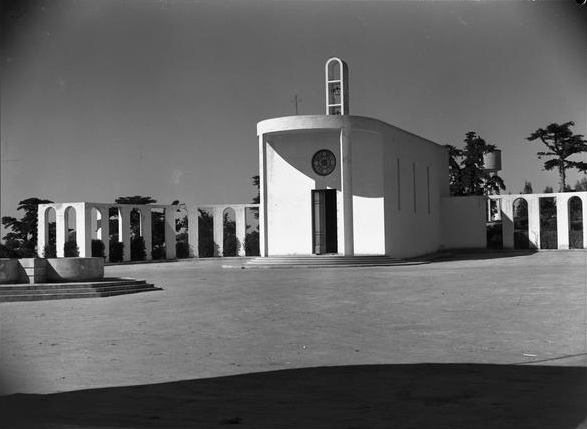
The same building, during the Italian period

== See also ==
- List of cities in Libya
