= 1948 anti-Jewish riots in Tripolitania =

1948 riots in Tripoli, British Tripolitania

1948 Tripolitania riots
- Part of Spillover of the 1947–1948 civil war in Mandatory Palestine
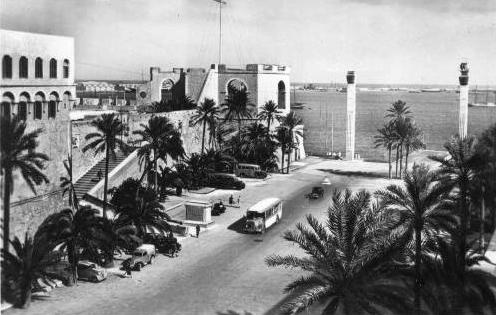
- Downtown Tripoli, 1940's
- Date: 12 June 1948
- Location: Tripoli, British Tripolitania; 32°54′8″N 13°11′9″E
- Caused by: Disputes over United Nations Partition Plan for Palestine
- Methods: Rioting, melee attacks

Parties
Libyan Muslims	Libyan Jews

Casualties and losses
4 killed 51 injured	13–14 killed 38 injured

The 1948 Anti-Jewish riots in Tripolitania were riots between the antisemitic rioters and Jewish communities of Tripoli and its surroundings in June 1948, during the British Military Administration in Libya. The events resulted in 13–14 Jews and 4 Arabs dead and destruction of 280 Jewish homes. The events occurred during the 1948 Arab–Israeli War.

== Background ==
The Jews of Libya had already suffered under Italian rule during World War II and shortly after it ended, when the bloody pogrom in Tripoli claimed many Jewish lives three years earlier.

The 1948 Arab–Israeli War had begun a month earlier following the proclamation of the State of Israel, although British-controlled Libya did not take part in the conflict. The proclamation of the State of Israel which began the war had "aroused among the Arabs less interest than was expected" in Tripoli according to the British authorities. (Note: Report of the Chief Administrator: "The proclamation of the state of Israel on 15th May 1948 aroused among the Arabs less interest then was expected and advice and pressure from B.M.A. prevented any public display of Jewish jubilation.") However, according to the report of the British Chief Administrator, Tripoli became a transit point for both Tunisian and Algerian volunteers on their way to fight for Egypt, which had just announced no more volunteers would be accepted, as well as "ardent young Zionists" on their way to Israel. (Note: Report of the Chief Administrator: "But after 15th May, despite intensified frontier control by the French authorities, Tunisian and Algerian volunteers began to appear in increasing numbers in Tripoli en route for the training camps at Mersa Matruh. This gave a stimulus to local volunteering and the Tripoli Palestine Defense Committee were busily engaged in sending French and Libyan recruits Eastwards. At the same time many ardent young Zionists were departing for Italy on the first stage of their journey to Israel..... On 7th June Egypt announced she would accept no more volunteers from the West.")

The British Public Information Office also reported "a certain aggressive spirit noticeable lately among the local Jewish youth", noting two incidents the day prior to the riots in which two Arabs were hospitalised after beatings by Jews following street accidents. This combined with the transiting volunteers "possibly provided the fuel for the outbreak which followed". (Note: British Public Information Office "It was the presence of these disgruntled visitors combined with a certain aggressive spirit noticeable lately among the local Jewish youth (two Arabs had been taken to hospital on June 11th after incidents in which they had been beaten by Jews after isolated street accidents) that possibly provided the fuel for the outbreak which followed.")

== The riot ==
The rioting began on 12 June in Tripoli, Libya. This time, unlike the previous Tripoli pogrom, the Jewish community of Tripoli had prepared to defend itself. Jewish self-defense units fought back against the Muslim rioters.

According to the British reports, the rioting broke out spontaneously. The Jewish defense measures had been prepared beforehand, with the British noting signs in Hebrew stating "It is good to die for one's country", and stated that during the riots the role of the Jewish organization "was not purely defence" since "determined parties of young Jews battled with the police in efforts to break out of The Old City in order to attack Arabs". (Note: Report of the Chief Administrator: "Rioting broke out spontaneously and there is no evidence or suggestion of planning or preliminary organization.... This cannot be said of the Jewish defence measures. They show some evidence of preparation as a few grenades were thrown from housetops and there were occasional shots. This, together with the appearance of signs in Hebrew "It is good to die for one's country" (Appendix IV) are an indication that some form of defence organization was in existence, and its role was not purely defence, because on several occasions determined parties of young Jews battled with the police in efforts to break out of The Old City in order to attack Arabs. When the situation was back to normal Jewish shopkeepers in the New City who opened their shops were threatened by small gangs of Jewish hooligans and forced to close again. The French Consul has reported an air of toughness and truculence among his Jewish proteges and officers of the Administration who experienced the 1945 riots have noticed a hardening of moral as compared with 1945.") The rioting began with an argument between a Jew and an Arab in central Tripoli, in which other Jews and Arabs joined in. Within half an hour a crowd of Arabs had gathered and made their way towards the Jewish Quarter of Old City (also known as the "Jewish Hara"), armed themselves with sticks and stones, following which Jewish units threw bombs into the crowd. The rioting continued for the next hour, during which Jews on rooftops retaliated, and also attacked the police forces, throwing bombs, stones and small arms fire. (Note: Report of the Chief Administrator: "Police and civilian eyewitnesses have uncontestably established that this was the initial incident from which arose, within minutes, the subsequent disorders.") (Note: British Public Information Office: "The Saturday morning and afternoon of June 12th were completely normal until 16.10 hrs. At this latter time a Jewish youth in the vicinity of the junction of Via Leopardi and Corso Sicilia became involved in an argument with an Arab. Some Tunisian Arabs, believed two, in the vicinity, also joined in and words led to blows and a running fight down the Via Leopardi in which other Tunisians from the vicinity of the Cafe Pasquale and Jews from the Mercato Rionale joined. The argument between the original Jew and Tunisians was forgotten and the cry was taken up by Arabs, presumed to be Tunisians, of "If we can't go to Palestine to fight the Jews lets fight them here". A crowd of Arabs quickly gathered and made for the Jewish quarter of the Old City via the Bab el Horria, Via Manzoni, Via Leopardi areas. Bombs were thrown by Jews at these Arabs who were themselves armed with sticks and stones. By 16.40 hrs a crowd of about 500 Arabs, mostly young boys, had taken up positions on the high waste ground to the immediate West of the Via Leopardi and were throwing rocks at Jews making for the Old City and others living in houses between Via Leopardi and Via Manzoni. The Jews were retaliating and had taken up positions on rooftops. Looting had started in houses nearby to the Arab crowd. A police officer and a party of police from Market Police Station turned out and on approaching the Jewish quarter from the Via Leopardi came under stone throwing from Jews on the city walls. A bomb was thrown at the police party from the rooftops manned by Jews. This was followed by several shots from small arms. The police party opened fire and succeeded temporarily in clearing an area between the opposing factions. A general stand-to of police was ordered at 17.40 hrs and a curfew ordered from 19.00 to 06.00hrs.")

The riots resulted in the death of thirteen or fourteen Jews, four Muslims, with 38 Jews and 51 Muslims being injured, and causing extensive property damage, and leaving approximately 300 families destitute. Jews in the surrounding countryside and in Benghazi were subjected to additional attacks.

== Aftermath ==
In November 1948, a few months after the riots, the American consul in Tripoli Orray Taft Jr. reported that: "There is reason to believe that the Jewish Community has become more aggressive as the result of the Jewish victories in Palestine. There is also reason to believe that the community here is receiving instructions and guidance from the State of Israel. Whether or not the change in attitude is the result of instructions or a progressive aggressiveness is hard to determine. Even with the aggressiveness or perhaps because of it, both Jewish and Arab leaders inform me that the inter-racial relations are better now than they have been for several years and that understanding, tolerance and cooperation are present at any top level meeting between the leaders of the two communities."

The insecurity which arose from anti-Jewish attacks led many Jews to abandon Libya and emigrate. The emigration, which was prompted by the 1945 Tripoli pogrom, had become a refugee "flood" with the ending of the 1948 Arab-Israeli War. From 1948 to 1951, and especially after immigration became legal in 1949, 30,972 Jews moved to Israel, which had gained independence.

== See also ==
- History of the Jews in Libya
- 1945 Anti-Jewish riots in Tripolitania
- 1948 Cairo bombings

== Bibliography ==
- Fischbach, Michael R. (2008), Claiming Jewish Communal Property in Iraq, Middle East Report, archived from the original on 20 June 2010
