= 1945 anti-Jewish riots in Tripolitania =

Pogrom against Jews in North Africa (1945)

- Jews in Italian Libya (number of Jews in each city)
- Location: Tripoli, British Tripolitania
- Date: 5–7 November 1945
- Target: Libyan Jews
- Attack type: Violent pogrom, massacre, ethnic cleansing
- Deaths: 140+ Libyan Jews killed
- Injuries: Hundreds of Jews injured
- Perpetrator: Muslim Libyan rioters

The 1945 anti-Jewish riots in Tripolitania were the most violent riots against Jews in North Africa in the 20th century. From November 5 to November 7, 1945, more than 140 Jews were killed and many more injured in a pogrom in Tripolitania, then under British military occupation. 38 Jews were killed in Tripoli from where the riots spread. 40 were killed in Amrus, 34 in Zanzur, 7 in Tajura, 13 in Zawia and 3 in Qusabat.

British authorities were heavily criticized for allegedly acting too slowly to stop the rioting. Major-General Duncan Cumming, the British Chief Civil Affairs Officer, noted that nationalist sentiments among local Arabs had been provoked by reports about Council of Foreign Ministers proposals "to hand the country back to Italian tutelage or to some other country with suspected Colonial designs," and that "It would seem that reports of the situation in Palestine and of anti-Jewish disturbances in Egypt finally touched off the pent-up excitement in the direction of the virtually defenceless Jews rather than against Italians. Hooliganism and fanaticism have played an important part in the disturbances together with a general tendency to loot." Official British reports highlight background factors responsible for the general tension at the time, such as economic hardship and the uncertain political future of Tripolitania. The neighbouring province was expect to become the independent Cyrenaica Emirate, whilst contemporary post-war proposals for Tripolitania included a return to Italian rule and a trusteeship under the Soviet Union.

At least 550 Libyan Muslims were arrested for their suspected involvement in the pogrom.

As a result of the slow British response, a widely held belief amongst Libyan Jews is that the riots were instigated by the British in order to show that the Libyans could not rule themselves, or as some kind of warning to Libyan Zionists relating to the ongoing Jewish insurgency in Palestine against British rule. However, American diplomats believed that the British had been caught unaware and "were sincere in their desire to curb [the] outbreaks promptly". State Department observer John E. Utter "believed that blame for the initial troubles lay with both sides—Jews primed for provocative behavior by Zionist propaganda and Arabs stirred by anti-Jewish riots in Cairo."

Together with previous persecutions of Jews by the Axis in Libya during World War II, the Tripoli rioting became a turning point in the history of Libyan Jews, becoming a central factor in the 1949–51 emigration organized by the Jewish Agency.

== Background ==
In the late 1930s, the Fascist Italian regime in Italian Libya began passing antisemitic laws. As a result of these laws, Jews were fired from government jobs, some were dismissed from government schools, and their citizenship papers were stamped with the words "Jewish race."

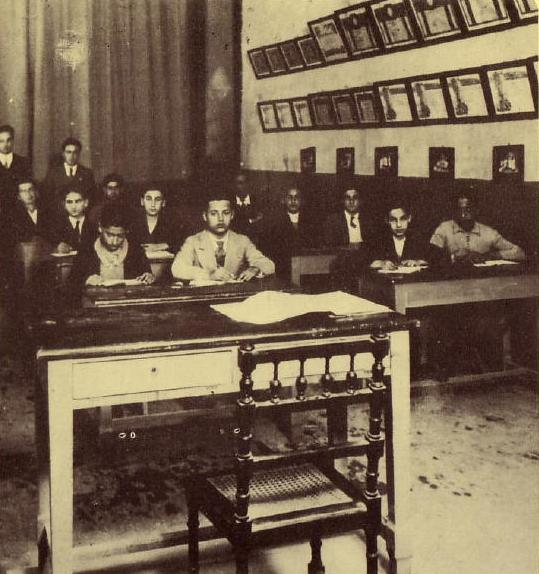
Benghazi Synagogue classroom in 1940

Despite this repression, that was partially opposed by governor Italo Balbo, in 1941 some 25% of the population of Tripoli was still Jewish and 44 synagogues were maintained in the city.

But in February 1942, German troops fighting the Allies in North Africa occupied the Jewish quarter of Benghazi, plundering shops and deporting more than 2,000 Jews across the desert. Sent to work in labor camps, more than one-fifth of this group of Jews perished.

Despite liberation from Fascist Italian and Nazi German influence in 1943, North African Jews kept suffering attacks. Arab nationalists were incorporating effective propaganda efforts and on November 2, 1945, the anniversary of the Balfour Declaration, a wave of anti-Jewish rioting hit the cities of Aleppo (Syria), Cairo (Egypt) and, most severely, Tripoli.

== The pogrom ==
Some of the worst anti-Jewish violence occurred following the liberation of North Africa by Allied troops. From November 5 to November 7, 1945, more than 140 Jews (including 36 children) were killed and hundreds more injured in the Tripoli pogrom. The rioters looted nearly all of the city's synagogues and destroyed five of them, along with hundreds of homes and businesses. In the aftermath about 4,000 Jews were left homeless, and 2,400 were reduced to poverty. Five synagogues in Tripoli and four in provincial towns were destroyed, and over 1,000 Jewish residences and commercial buildings were plundered in Tripoli alone. Many Jews in al-Kusbat converted to Islam in order to avoid being massacred.

As in the Iraqi case, the Tripoli massacre inaugurated a train of events that would demoralize and in a relatively short time dissolve the Libyan Jewish community. The event caused the beginning of the Libyan Jewish exodus. Thus, Jews began leaving Libya three years before the establishment of Israel and seven years before Libya gained independence.

== Aftermath ==
At least 550 Libyans were arrested for their suspected involvement in the pogrom. They were tried for their involvement by British military courts.

The situation of Libyan Jews further escalated with the eruption of the 1948 Arab–Israeli War. In June 1948, anti-Jewish rioters in Libya killed another 12 Jews and destroyed 280 Jewish homes. This time, however, the Libyan Jewish community had prepared to defend itself. Jewish self-defense units fought back against the rioters, preventing dozens of more deaths.

The insecurity which arose from these anti-Jewish attacks, as well as the founding of the state of Israel led many Jews to emigrate. From 1948 to 1951, and especially after immigration became legal in 1949, 30,972 Jews immigrated to Israel.

During the next decade and a half, the remaining Jews in Libya were put under numerous restrictions, including laws which governed their ability to move around (generally outside the country), their legal status and identification cards and property issues; the Jews of Libya were discriminated against and oppressed through codified laws. More violence erupted after the Six-Day War, leaving 18 Jews dead and many more injured. Following this, the remaining Jewish community of Libya, numbering about 7,000 persons, was almost entirely evacuated to Italy, abandoning their property and homes. The last Jew in Libya, an old woman, was finally allowed to leave for Italy in 2003, after numerous tries by her adult son.

== See also ==
- History of the Jews in Libya
- Jews of Libya during the Holocaust
- Farhud – 1941 anti-Jewish massacre in Baghdad, Iraq
- 1945 Anti-Jewish riots in Egypt
- 1948 Anti-Jewish riots in Tripolitania
- 1967 Tripoli pogrom
